= DKB =

DKB may stand for:

- Dai-Ichi Kangyo Bank, Japan
- Deutscher Kanarien- und Vogelzüchterbund, a German Bird Association
- Deutsche Kreditbank, a German bank
  - Ostseestadion (previously DKB-Arena), a German football stadium
- Deutscher Künstlerbund (Association of German Artists)
- Danish Royal Library (Det Kongelige Bibliotek)
- DKB (band), South Korea
- Donkey Kong Bananza, a 2025 video game
