= Hedwig Lewenstein =

Hedwig Lewenstein-Weyermann (October 11, 1875 in Bonn - May 20, 1937 in Amsterdam) was a German Jewish art collector.

== Family life ==
Born in Bonn, into a German Jewish family, Hedwig Weyermann was the daughter of Gottschalk Weyermann and Mina Oppenheimer. She married the Dutch art collector Emanuel Albert Lewenstein (December 5, 1870 – 10 June 10,1930), and they had two children Robert (October 30, 1905 in Amsterdam - 1975 in Ohio, USA) and Wilhelmine Lewenstein. Lewenstein-Weyermann had two siblings, Victor (born August 6, 1872) and Mathilde Citroen (Weijermann, also known as "Weyermann" (February 3, 1874 in Bonn - September 24, 1946 in Heemstede). Lewenstein-Weyermann's husband Emanuel died in 1930, and she died in 1937.

== Nazi persecution ==
When Nazi Germany invaded the Netherlands in 1940, the German and Dutch Lewenstein family was persecuted because of their Jewish heritage. Lewenstein-Weyermann's daughter Wilhelmine emigrated with her husband José da Silva via the Netherlands to Mozambique in 1938. Her son Robert went to Vence, France.

In 2017 the Lewenstein heirs filed a lawsuit in the US District Court, Southern District of New York against the Bayerische Landesbank for the restitution of a painting by Wassily Kandinsky called Das Bunte Leben [The Colorful Life] (1907). Lewenstein had lent the painting to the Stedelijk Museum in 1933 and, in circumstances that remained unclear, it was auctioned in 1940 at the Frederik Muller & Co auction house. On 9 October 1940 Das bunte Leben was acquired by Salomon B. Slijper whose widow sold it in 1972 to the Bayerische Landesbank. The bank loaned it to the Städtische Galerie im Lenbachhaus and the Kunstbau in Munich where it was located at the time of the claim. In June of 2023, the Advisory Commission recommended that the Kandinsky be restituted to Lewenstein's heirs.
