= Das Bunte Leben =

1907 painting by Wassily Kandinsky

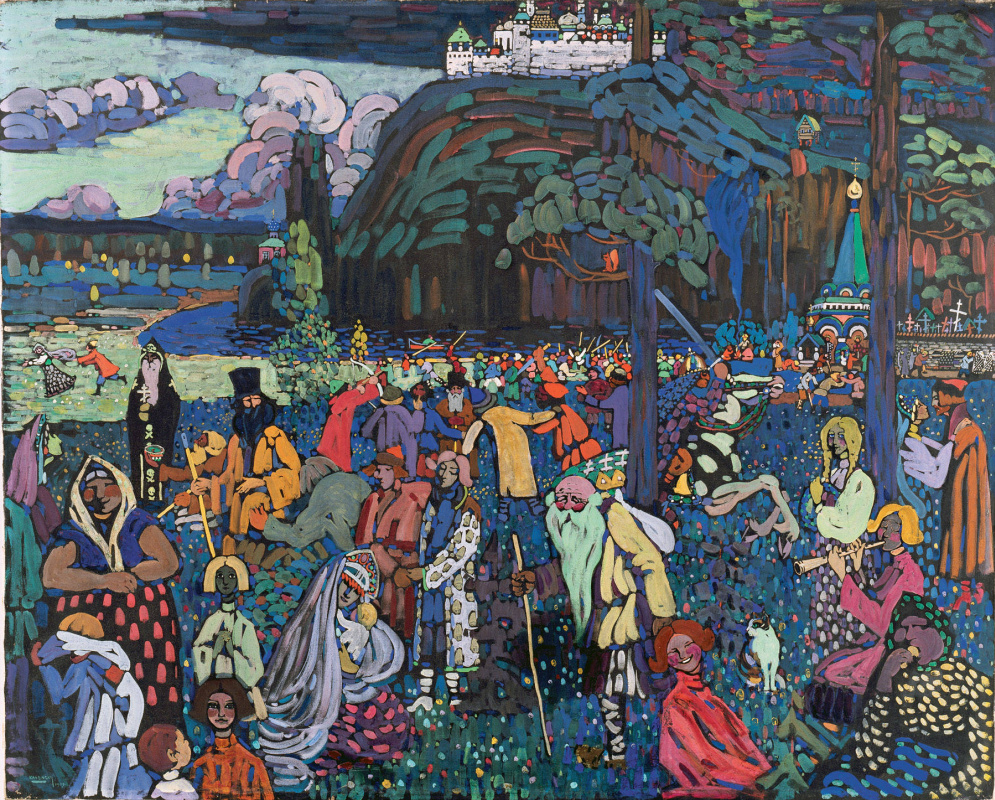
- Artist: Wassily Kandinsky
- Year: 1907
- Medium: Tempera on canvas
- Dimensions: 130 cm × 162.5 cm (51 in × 64.0 in)
- Location: Lenbachhaus, Munich

Das Bunte Leben (The Colourful Life) is a tempera-and-gouache painting on canvas by the Russian artist Wassily Kandinsky, made in 1907 during the artist's time in Paris with his former student, partner and fellow artist Gabriele Münter. Until 2023, it was held in the Lenbachhaus in Munich.

== History ==
Dutch art collector Emanuel Lewenstein bought the painting immediately after it was finished in 1907. After his death, his widow, Hedwig, loaned it to Stedelijk Museum Amsterdam for safekeeping.

On 3 March 2017, three of his heirs filed suit in New York City against Bayerische Landesbank who believed they properly owned the painting, then valued at $80 million.

The lawsuit claimed that the painting was effectively taken and sold without permission, "The painting was taken from its legitimate owners in 1940 in violation of international law during the period of the Nazi occupation in the Netherlands in furtherance of the Nazi campaign of Jewish genocide". In June 2023, a German restitutions committee ruled in favor of the Lewenstein heirs' case against Bayerische Landesbank, resulting in the return of the painting to the Lewensteins. According to the commission Hedwig Lewenstein, the sole owner after her husband's death, loaned the painting to the Stedelijk Museum in Amsterdam. Under murky circumstance the artwork was "collected" from the museum in 1940 by an art dealer named Abraham Mozes Querido and then auctioned at Frederik Muller & Co, where it was purchased by Salomon B. Slijper. Slijper concealed the painting during the war, and, after his death, his widow sold it, and it ended up in the possession of the Bayerische Landesbank.

in 2023, the German government’s advisory commission on Nazi-looted art recommended it be returned to the Lewenstein family. The work was offered in an auction at Christie's London on 14 October 2026, with estimates at over $30 million. It sold in six minutes for ₤31 million to an undisclosed buyer.

== See also ==
- List of paintings by Wassily Kandinsky
- 1907 in art
