= Lotto Thüringen Arena on the Rennsteig =

Biathlon stadium near Oberhof

Lotto Thüringen Arena am Rennsteig
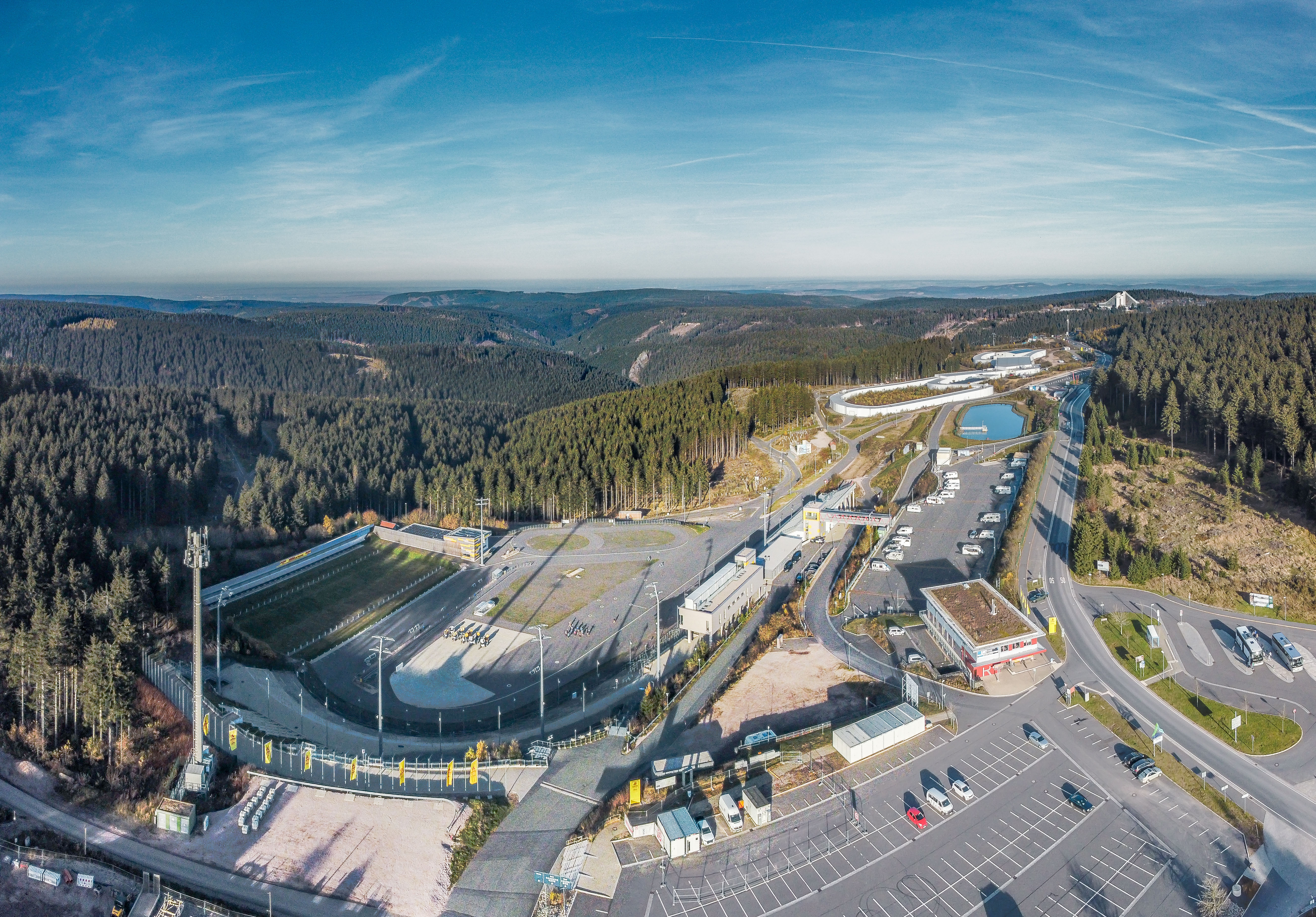
- Interactive map of Lotto Thüringen Arena am Rennsteig
- Address: Am Grenzadler 2, 98559 Oberhof, Thuringia, Germany
- Owner: Town of Oberhof
- Capacity: 13000

Construction
- Opened: 1982

Website
- weltcup-oberhof.de, wintersportzentrum-thueringen.de

Lotto Thüringen Arena am Rennsteig is a biathlon stadium near Oberhof, located 814 meters above sea level directly on the main ridge of the Thuringian Forest. Until 2003, it was called the Biathlonstadion am Rennsteig, then the Rennsteig-Arena Oberhof until December 2007, and subsequently the DKB-Ski-Arena, named after its sponsor, Deutsche Kreditbank, until December 2018. Since January 2019, it has been named after Lotto Thüringen.

The stadium regularly hosts World Cup biathlon events. The course near Oberhof is considered one of the most challenging in the entire World Cup, and spectator numbers have been among the highest of any World Cup event to date.

== History ==
In 1953, the first patrol race, a predecessor of modern biathlon, took place in Oberhof during the fourth GDR Ski Championships. However, biathlon did not gain prominence in Oberhof until 1958. As biathlon was added to the Olympic Games program in 1960, the Armeesportklub (ASK) Vorwärts Oberhof, the predecessor of WSV Oberhof 05, began training in biathlon in 1958 and won two titles at the GDR Championships that year. For this purpose, a shooting range was built on the Kalten Mark, 600 meters southwest of today's Rennsteig Arena, directly above the barracks on the 869-meter-high Saukopf. For training, army pioneers and civilian construction companies built an asphalt roller ski track 600 meters northwest of the current arena. ASK Oberhof then provided the entire biathlon team for the GDR at the Winter Olympics.

=== Biathlon Stadium on the Rennsteig ===
The successes of the GDR biathlon team, including Frank Ullrich's first Olympic victory in 1980, prompted the Ministry of National Defence, at the urging of ASK Oberhof, to build a biathlon stadium in the early 1980s to improve conditions for biathletes, as the old shooting range was frequently affected by fog. A new shooting range was constructed on the site of the old one, which is still used for training today.

The Minister of Defence of the GDR, Army General Heinz Hoffmann, ordered the construction of a new shooting range. The location was chosen without proper planning or consultation with local authorities, and construction began in the Fallbäche area by construction pioneers of the National People's Army (NVA). The site was highly unfavorable due to challenging terrain, including impenetrable forest on a sloping hillside, large amounts of groundwater, swamp, mud, and exposed rock. Heavy rainfall in the summer of 1981 further complicated construction. Protests against the project were ignored, citing the ministerial order, and the district council lifted a building freeze. No consideration was given to the fact that the site was located near the Fallbach springs, vital for Oberhof's water supply.

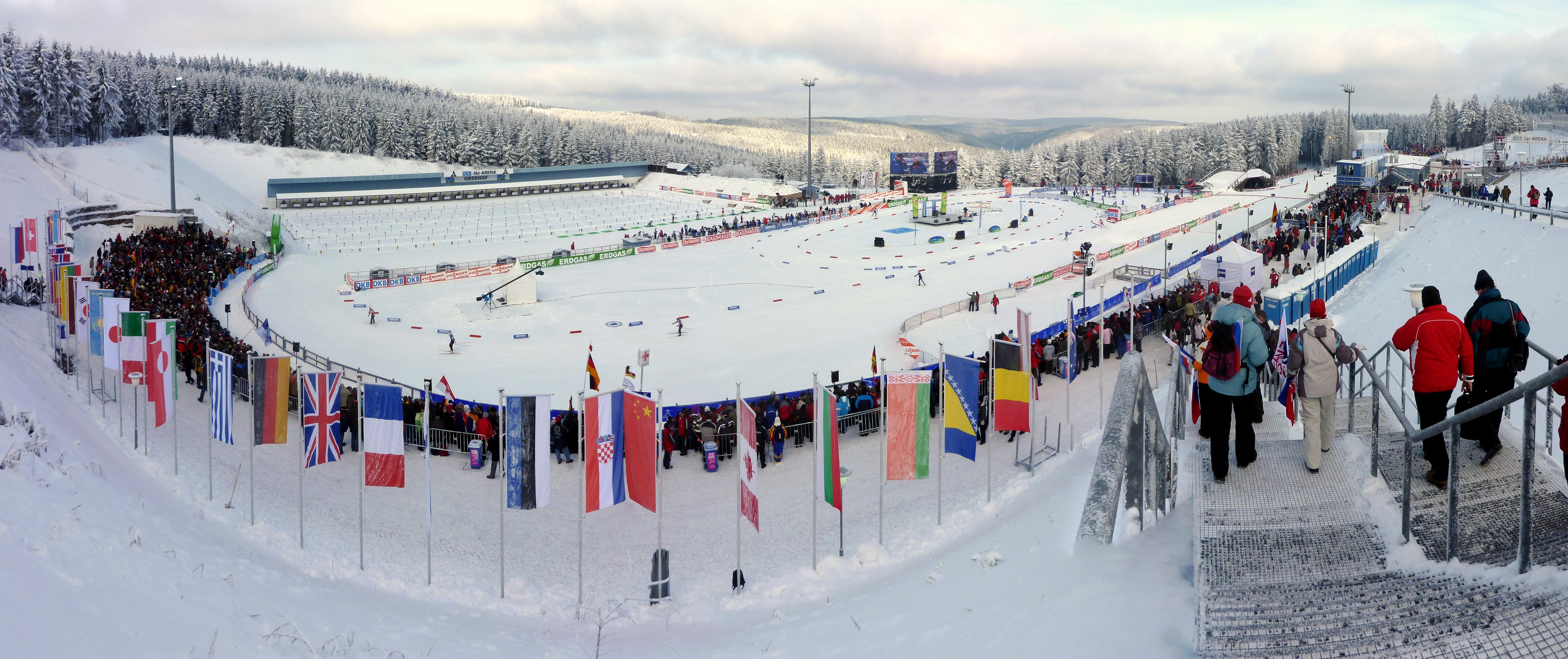
Ski arena at the 2010 Biathlon World Cup

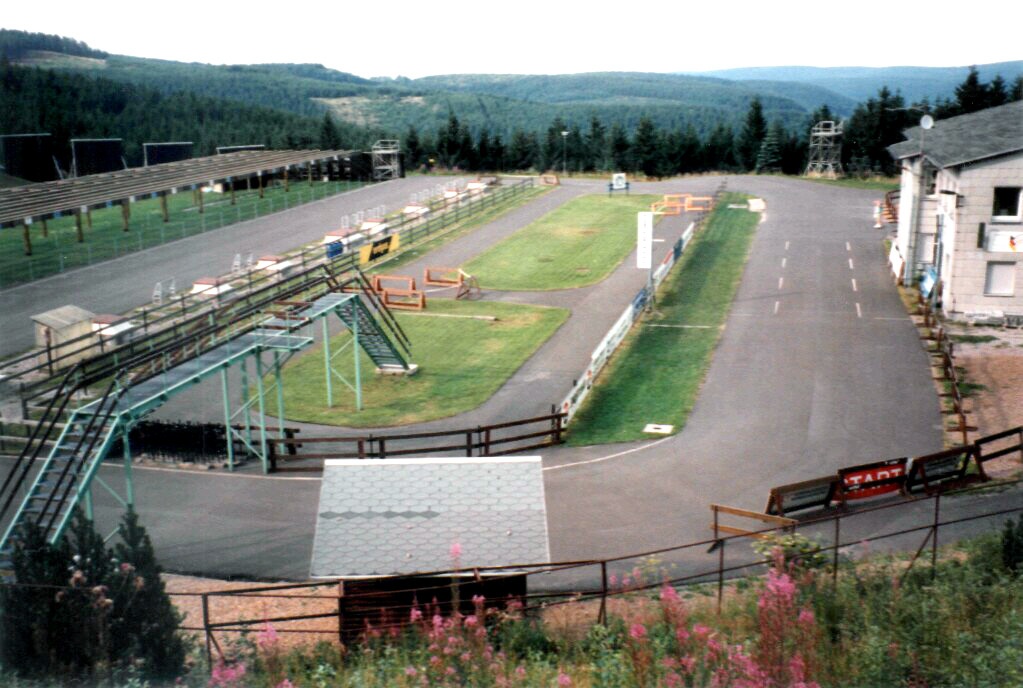
Stadium in 1997

Under the direction of Karl Koch, pioneers cleared a 170-by-145-meter area in May 1981 to make way for the biathlon stadium. A total of 40,000 cubic meters of soil was removed, often in special shifts due to frequent rain interruptions. The two-story control building, with a floor area of 10 by 20 meters, and a single-story scoreboard building, measuring 6 by 10 meters, were completed in shell form by November 1981, with interior work finished during the winter months. The buildings were completed on 30 September 1982. In spring 1982, construction began on the shooting range and roller ski track. The shooting range was built on 70 cast-in-place concrete foundations. A removable bridge allowed athletes, coaches, and officials to access the interior. Another bridge in the exit area enabled tracks to cross. A fixed screen system, a first in biathlon history, was installed behind the shooting range. The range featured 32 lanes equipped with folding targets developed in the GDR and paper targets alongside them.

Various running tracks, each three meters wide, were designed for the classic running style in parallel lanes. These tracks were too narrow for the skating style, which emerged later and requires wider tracks.

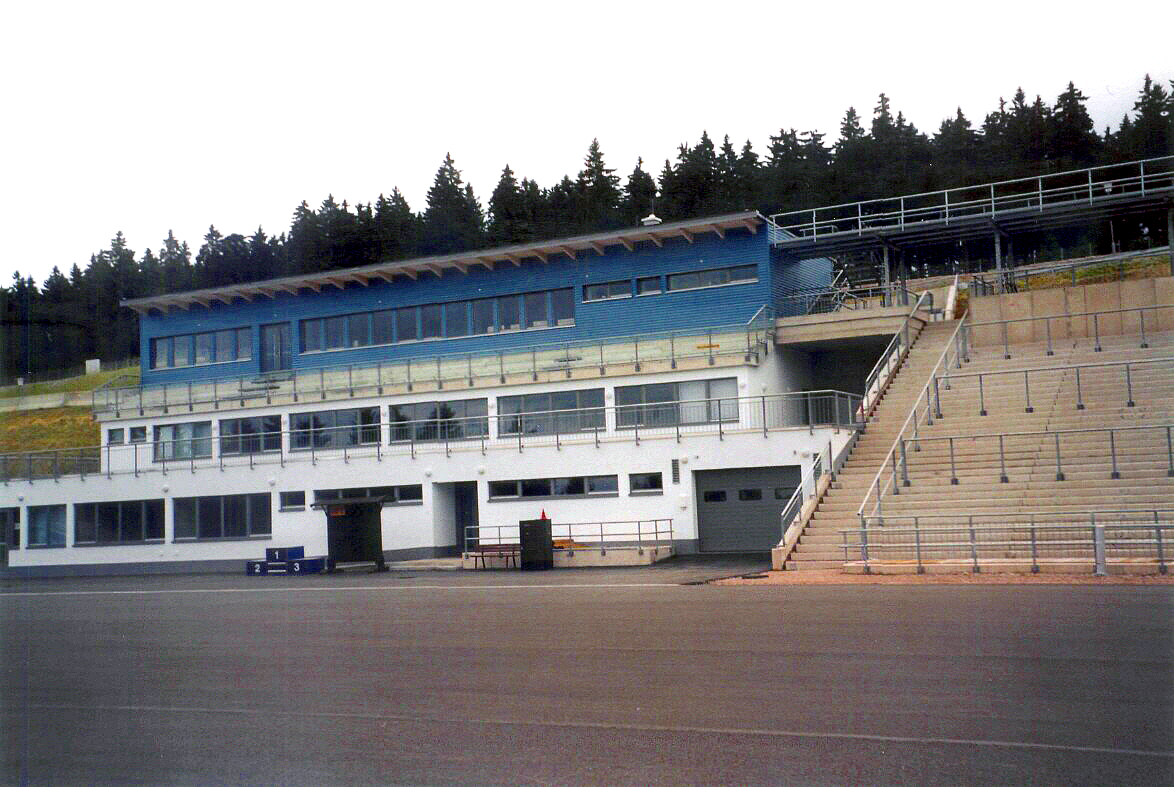
Control building in 2003

On 3 March 1983, the biathlon stadium hosted its first competition, the GDR Championships, where reigning world champion Frank Ullrich won the opening 20-kilometer men's event in ideal weather conditions. A week later, during a thaw, the facility faced its first international test with the biathlon competitions of the Army Spartakiad of the Friendship Armies. Despite temperatures of three degrees Celsius and persistent snowmelt, the event succeeded due to significant efforts, including snow transported by the NVA from the Frauenwald region and the area around the 983-meter-high Beerberg. Many generals from socialist armies attended, with the guest of honor being Sven Thofelt, president of the International Union for Modern Pentathlon and Biathlon (UIPMB, predecessor of the IBU) and 1928 Olympic champion in modern pentathlon. Surrounded by prominent figures, he said to Rolf Hackel, the mayor of Oberhof:

Apply for world championships. I assure you, you will get them, definitely.

The first Biathlon World Cup took place in Oberhof in 1984. Several more World Cups followed, and the facility underwent extensive modernization in 1992, primarily in the technical area. Initially under NVA control and later the Bundeswehr after reunification, the biathlon stadium was handed over to the Federal Training Centre (BLZ) on 1 January 1997, along with the shooting hall.

=== Rennsteig arena ===
After Oberhof was awarded the Biathlon World Championships in 2004 at the International Biathlon Union (IBU) Congress in Salzburg in 1998, plans were made to build a new stadium. Construction began under STRABAG Thüringen, supervised by site manager Cordes, with a symbolic groundbreaking ceremony on 28 May 2001. The old biathlon building from 1982, which obstructed spectators' views, was demolished and replaced by a modern, three-story building with a gross volume of 3,500 cubic meters and a roof terrace. The Rennsteig Arena now spans 60,000 square meters.

A 105-meter-long main grandstand was constructed, extending in a 90-degree arc to the shooting range, offering standing room for 8,000 people. Spectators have an optimal view of the shooting range, penalty lap track, start, and finish line. On the other side of the building, a mobile grandstand accommodates 4,000 people. Athletes, referees, and journalists access functional areas from the control building via an underpass, avoiding competition tracks. The shooting range was rotated nearly 90 degrees. The renovation required moving 130,000 cubic meters of earth, installing 2,000 cubic meters of ready-mixed concrete, and processing 340 tonnes of steel. The biathlon tracks were widened from three to six meters with 10,000 square meters of bitumen surfacing.

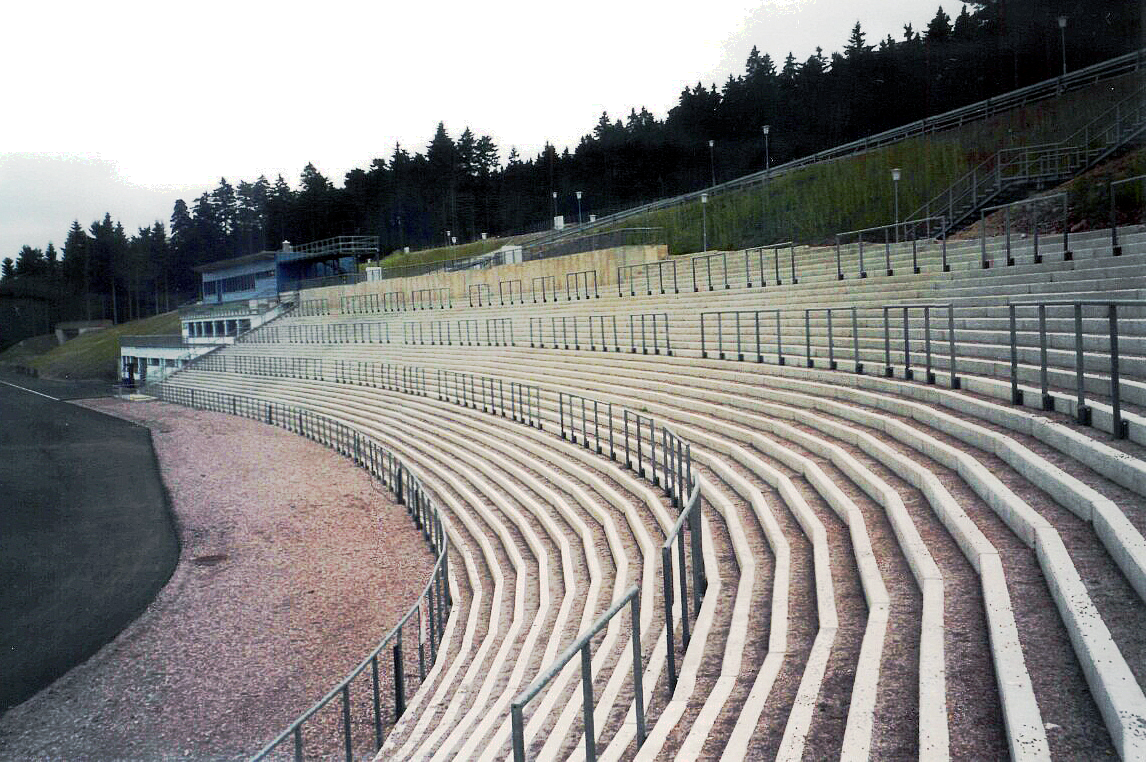
105-meter grandstand, 2003

On 13 September 2002, 16 months after the groundbreaking, the topping-out ceremony for the functional building was celebrated during the German Championships. Remaining construction work was completed in 2003. The first competition was the German Biathlon Cup from 20 to 22 December 2002, and the first international competition, a Nordic combined running event, took place on 31 December 2002. In 2003, the Oberhof town council renamed the facility from Biathlon Stadium on the Rennsteig to Rennsteig Arena Oberhof. A stadium festival, including the unveiling of a plaque with the new name, occurred on 20 September 2003. TCC Medienwerkstatt GmbH in Zella-Mehlis developed a unique logo for the stadium.

The renovation cost approximately €6.1 million. The Free State of Thuringia contributed €3.4 million, the federal government €1.45 million, the district of Schmalkalden-Meiningen €600,000, and Oberhof's municipal budget €230,000. The Federal Employment Agency provided €400,000. Other sources estimate the cost at €6.4 million. In December 2007, naming rights were sold to Deutsche Kreditbank (DKB), which also sponsors biathletes. The name changed to DKB-Ski-Arena Oberhof following unanimous approval at a special Oberhof City Council meeting. The new name was used starting with the Nordic Combined World Cup on 30 December 2007. In December 2017, DKB announced its withdrawal from sponsorship by the end of 2018. Since 1 January 2019, the stadium has been called the Lotto Thüringen Arena am Rennsteig.

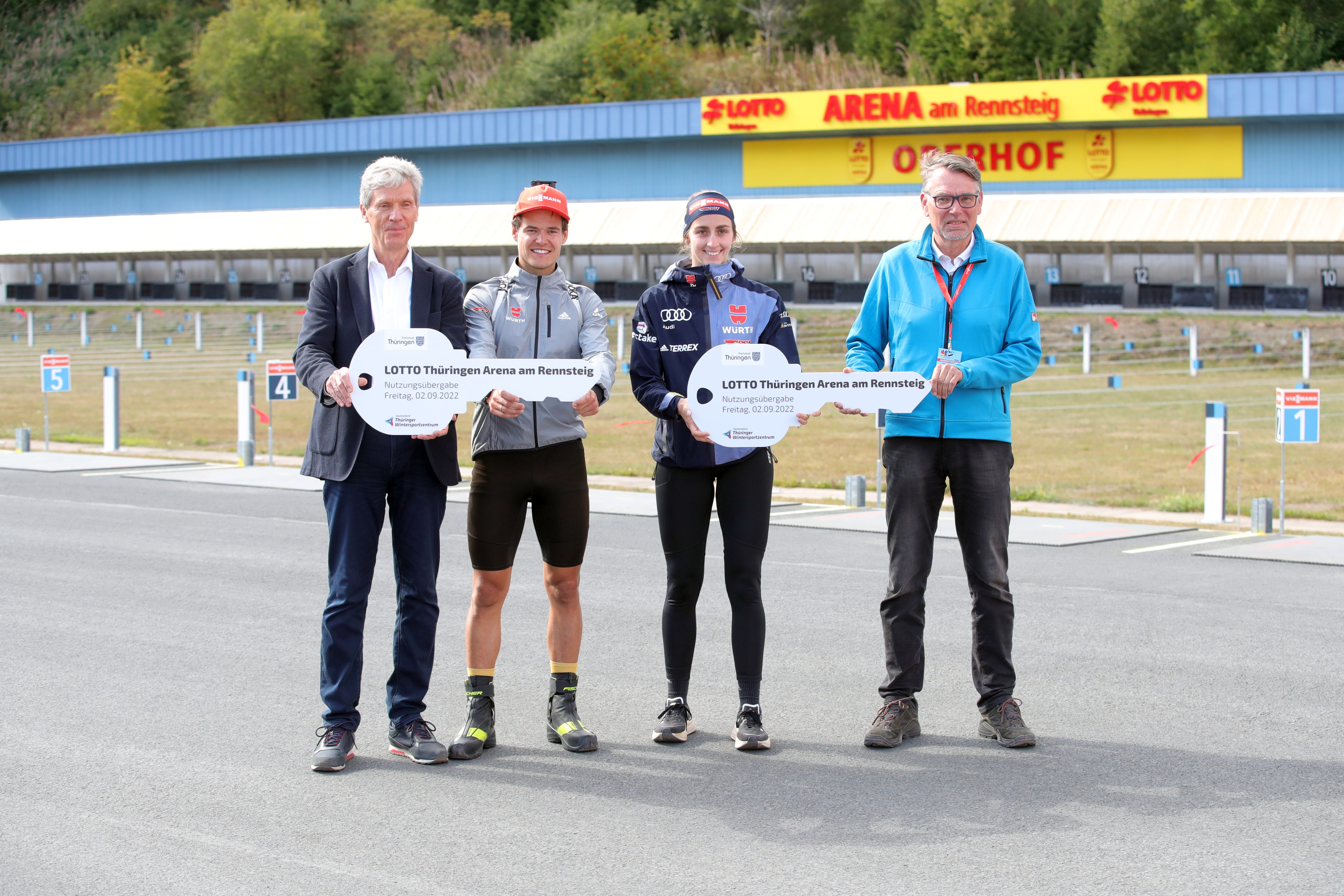
Official handover of the arena after renovation: Helmut Holter, Philipp Horn, Vanessa Voigt, and Hartmut Schubert

Following the award of the 2023 Biathlon World Championships, extensive renovations were carried out. The start area and penalty loop were relocated, grandstands were expanded, two new functional buildings were erected, access for athletes and coaches was improved, and the route was modified, particularly at the Frankfurter Kreuz.

== The Arena ==
=== Location ===
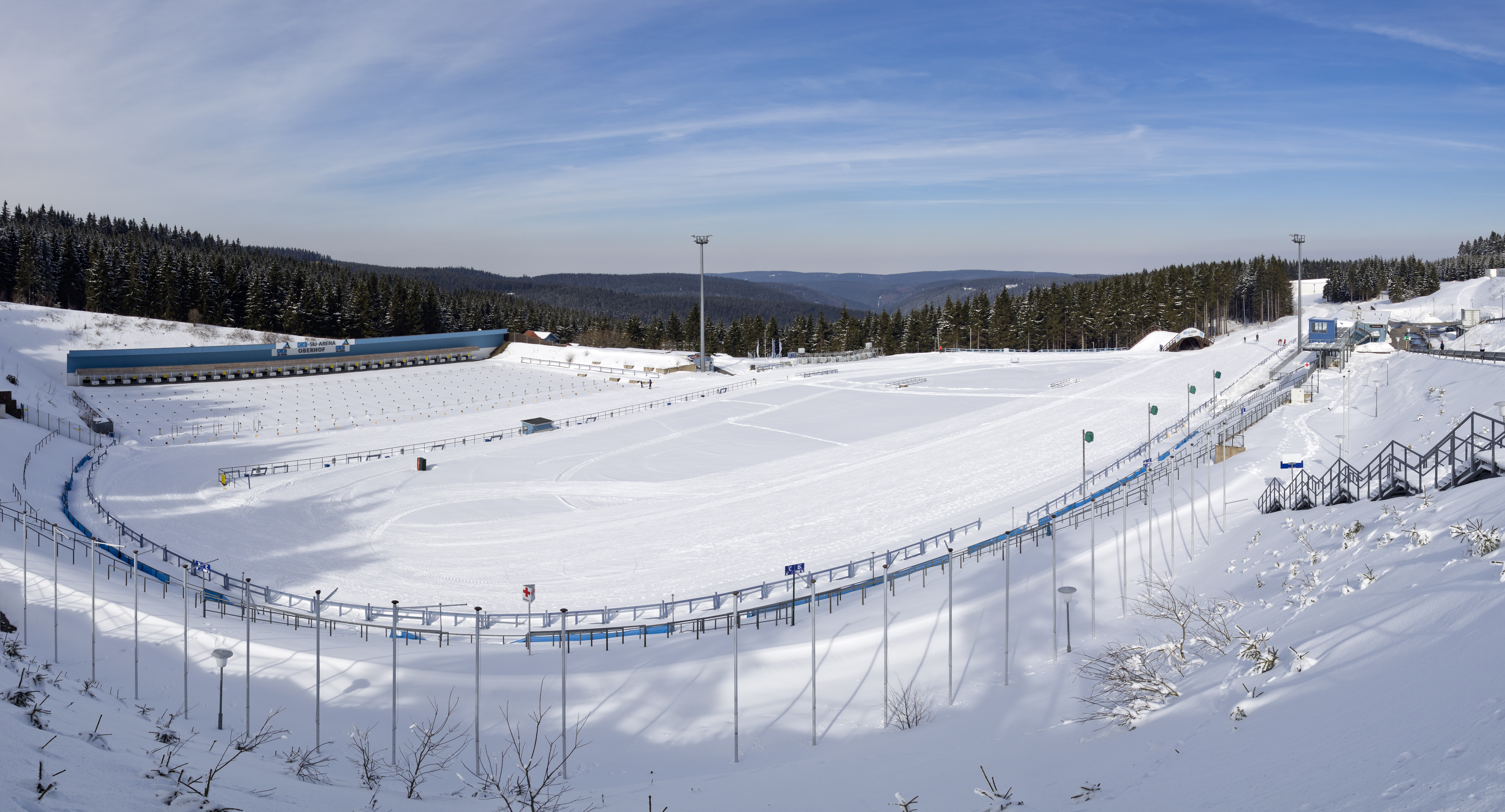
Arena on the Rennsteig in 2013

The arena is located approximately 2.5 kilometers west of Oberhof in the Thuringian Forest at the Grenzadler, a two-meter-high boundary stone with a Prussian eagle, 837 meters above sea level. The Grenzadler also features a large car park and a barracks belonging to the German Armed Forces Sports Promotion Group. The former army barracks, completed in 1961, later became the home of biathletes, previously housed in the Kammerbacher Pirschhaus. The area around the Grenzadler car park was formerly known as the Schützenwiese (shooting range). Approximately 200 meters south of the Rennsteig Arena is the Rennsteig, a 169.3-kilometer-long high-altitude hiking trail that inspired the arena's name, with the border eagle marking the 61.4-kilometer point.

=== Spectator area ===
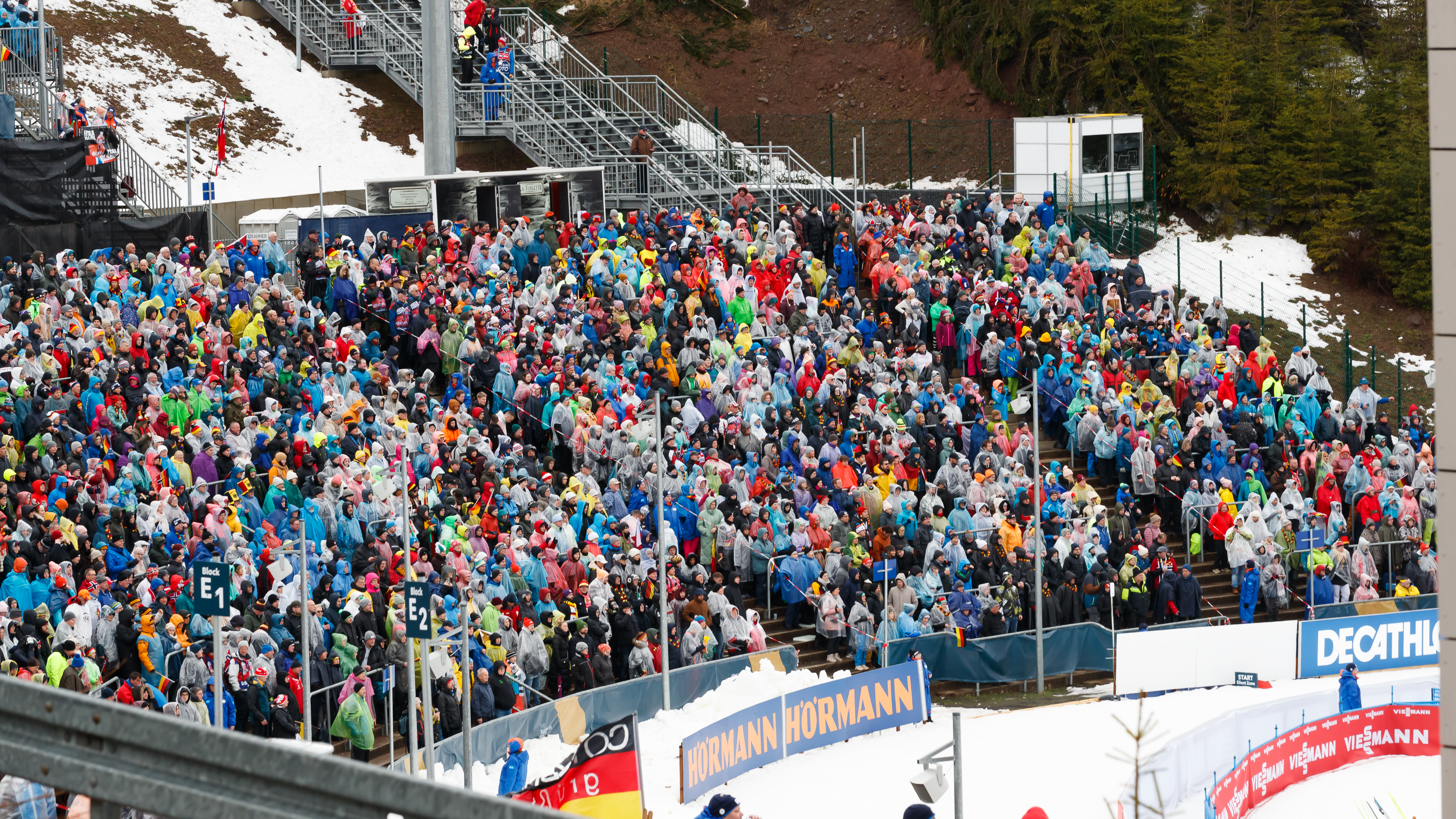
View of the spectator stands in 2023

The stadium has a capacity of approximately 13,000 spectators. Of these, 6,500 can be seated in a 105-meter-long grandstand, divided into blocks A to G, located to the left of the control building. A mobile steel tube grandstand on the other side accommodates 4,000 spectators in blocks H and I. For the 2008 World Cup, 980 seats were added in the lower section, reducing standing room by about 1,000 places. The grandstands offer sightlines to the shooting range from 55 to 160 meters. Other sources report 9,000 spectators for the 105-meter grandstand and 6,500 for the steel tube grandstand. Due to increasing spectator numbers, an additional grandstand, the Waldtribüne (forest grandstand), was erected at the end of the sawdust track near the former finish area for the 2006 World Cup, providing space for 1,000 people.

Up to 12,000 spectators are allowed along the tracks during World Cup events, primarily near the Birxsteig, where a video wall is set up. A temporary bridge in this area allows spectators to cross the Birxsteig. For the 2008 World Cup, the spectator area along the track was optimized with an information system, including signs for accessible areas. An additional interchange bridge was added, bringing the total to four bridges along the tracks. To facilitate seating during competitions, spectators are divided among the three stands and the track at the Grenzadler bus parking lot.

=== Shooting range ===
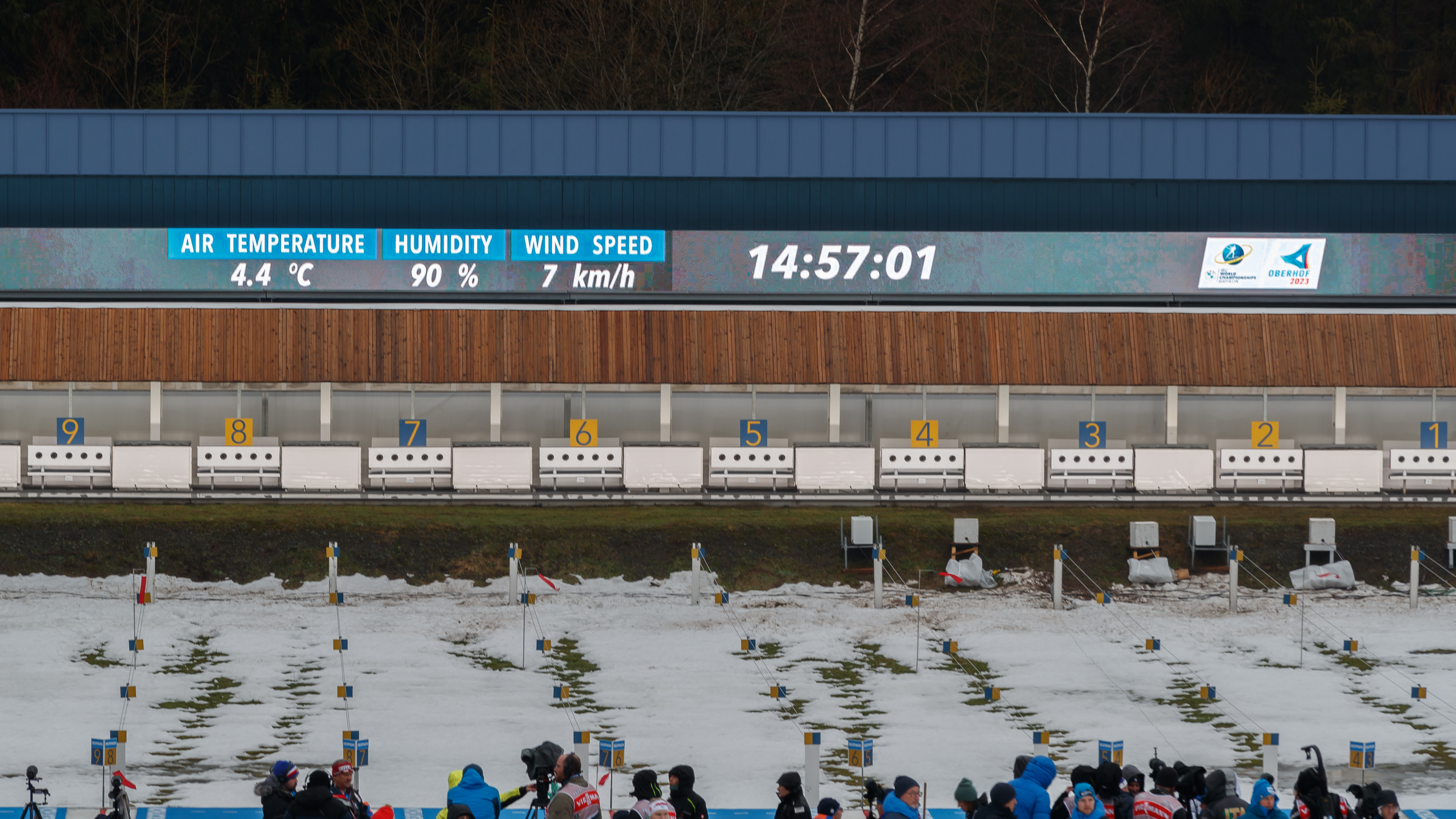
View of the modernized shooting range in 2023

The shooting range, with 30 lanes, positions athletes 50 meters from the target. It is equipped with the German electronic system HoRa 2000 E, the most advanced and widely used in the World Cup. Unlike the Kurvinen flip targets from Finland, used in some World Cup events, hits are triggered by a sensor, with a white disc placed in front of the black disc to indicate hits. A sliding screen adjusts the five hit fields per lane from 115 millimeters for standing shots to 45 millimeters for prone shots.

The shooting range is protected by earth embankments at the rear and sides, with transverse screens above the lanes to stop stray shots, complying with German and Thuringian safety regulations. These screens are required for national events and training but are removed for international competitions under International Biathlon Union (IBU) regulations, which do not require glare protection.

In 2021, for the 2023 Biathlon World Championships, an LED screen was installed above the targets to display information such as the athlete's name and targets for spectators.

=== Technical equipment ===
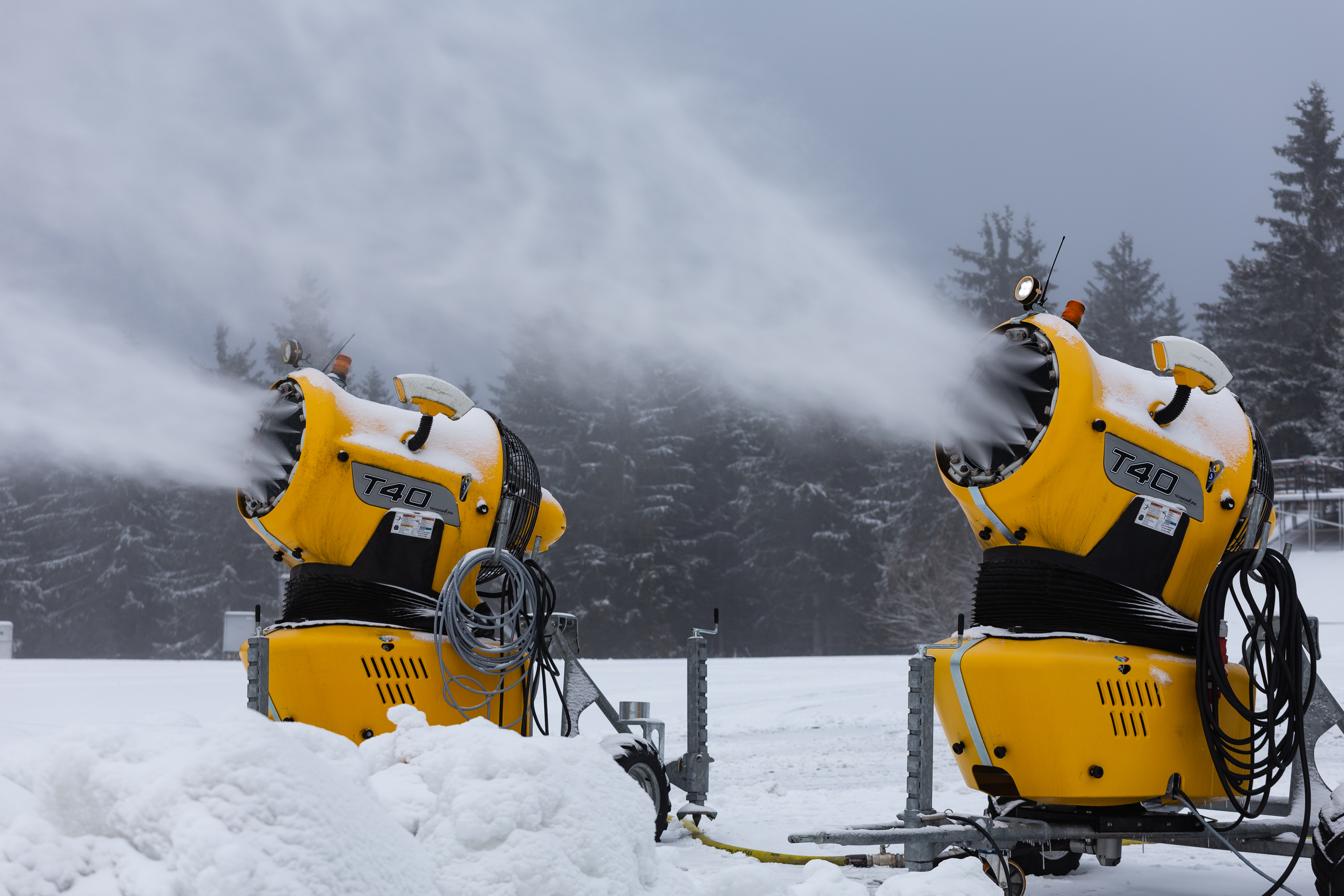
Snow cannons in Oberhof

During competitions, two video screens allow spectators to follow the action on the tracks. For the 2006 World Cup, one 24-square-meter screen was replaced with a 40-square-meter screen. A third video wall is located on Birxsteig, and a fourth was added in front of the Waldtribüne for the 2008 World Cup. Snack and refreshment stands are set up at the arena entrances during competitions.

The average snow depth in Oberhof is 35 centimeters. In poor snow conditions, if temperatures permit, snow cannons cover the stadium and tracks. If too warm for artificial snow, snow deposits from shady areas like Kanzlersgrund or Schneekopf, five kilometers south, are transported by truck. For the 2005 World Cup, 200 truckloads of snow were stored in Kanzlersgrund, enabling Oberhof to host the first World Cup in the snow-poor 2000/2001 season.

In the snow-scarce winter of 2006/2007, mild weather prevented snow reserves or snow cannon use. To ensure the 2007 World Cup, 80 truckloads of crash ice from an ice factory in Bremerhaven, 550 kilometers away, were delivered from 20 December 2006. Approximately 4,000 cubic meters of coarse-grained snow formed a 2.5-kilometer slope, with additional snow produced in a 15-by-30-meter, six-meter-high cold tent with nine snow cannons, costing several hundred thousand euros.

In November 2013, a water storage pond named Wolfgangsee, after Wolfgang Filbrich, the long-standing head of the Oberhof World Cup Organizing Committee, was commissioned to supply snow cannons.

=== Trivia ===
In summer 2006, a joint campaign by ZDF and Baedeker selected the 50 favorite places of Germans. Nearly 350,000 people voted, and the Rennsteig Arena ranked 15th, the highest among sports venues, in the ZDF program Unsere Besten on 23 September 2006.

== Stretching ==
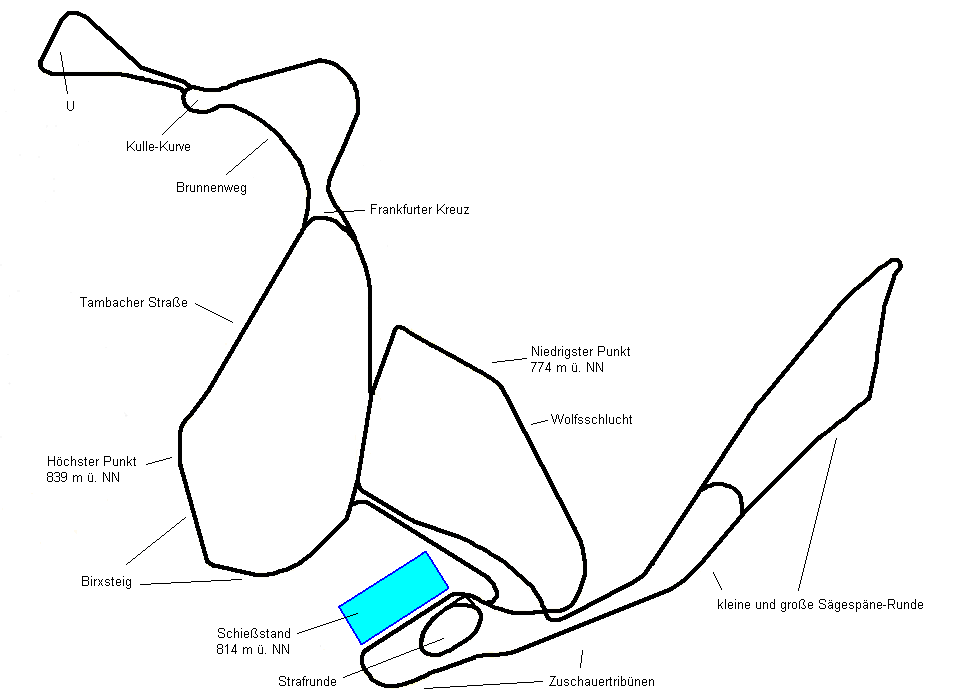
Former route map

The trails in Oberhof are considered very challenging, with long descents like the Wolfsschlucht, where high speeds are reached, alternating with steep climbs like the Birxsteig. Widened during the 2004 World Championships renovation, the trails allow overtaking on most sections. The route network comprises five sections of varying lengths and difficulties. The longest, route one, is 3,999 meters, covering the entire network except the rear sawdust circuit. The other routes are 3,446, 3,099, 2,595, and 2,151 meters, at altitudes between 774 and 839 meters above sea level. All tracks have FIS certification and can be combined flexibly. Since 2015, an additional loop named after former biathlete Andrea Henkel has been added in front of the stadium.

=== Route description ===
The route sections, including Wolfsschlucht, Birxsteig, Tambacher Straße, Frankfurter Kreuz, U, Brunnenweg, Kulle-Kurve, and Sägespäne-Runde, are selected based on race type, required length, and competitor gender. Course conditions also influence selection; for example, the Wolfsschlucht was omitted in the 2007 World Cup due to insufficient snow. It is often skipped in the first lap of relay or mass start races, approached only after the first shooting when the field spreads out. The Sägespäne-Runde is divided into small and large circuits, used based on race length and discipline.

==== Wolf's Gorge ====
To meet international requirements for elevation and technical conditions, the Wolfsschlucht (Wolf's Gorge) was built, named after former biathlete Karl-Heinz Wolf, who designed it. The fastest section in the World Cup, it reaches speeds over 80 kilometers per hour. Safety was improved by filling the compression at the bottom with earth, reducing even higher speeds previously reached. At 774 meters above sea level, the compression is the lowest point on the route.

==== Birxsteig ====
The Birxsteig, the longest climb, runs behind the shooting range with the steepest gradients, attracting large crowds during competitions. A video wall is set up on the back wall of the shooting range. A 6.21-meter-long and 2.07-meter-wide bridge crosses the Birxsteig, allowing spectators to switch sides. Named after trail manager Roland Schmidt, nicknamed Birx, it starts at the Wolfsschlucht compression (774 meters) and climbs 500 meters to the highest point (839 meters). Since the 2005 World Cup, a rail camera follows athletes on the climb.

==== Tambacher road ====
The section from Birxsteig to Frankfurter Kreuz is called Tambacher Straße, the old road from Oberhof to Tambach-Dietharz.

==== Frankfurt cross ====
The Frankfurter Kreuz, 450 meters northwest of the Rennsteig Arena, is the central hub of the route network. It serves as the turning point for routes four and five and connects routes one, two, and three to the Hochwald and U. Its name, inspired by the Frankfurter Kreuz, reflects the complex ski traffic, as noted by a route manager.

==== Well path ====
The Brunnenweg (Well Path) reflects Oberhof's history, with seven wells accessible via paths. One large well within the route network serves as a water reservoir for the facility.

==== Kulle curve ====
To improve safety, a dangerous right-hand bend at the end of the roller track was widened into the Kulle-Kurve, named after Karl-Heinz Wolf (nicknamed Kulle), allowing athletes from Tambacher Straße to return to the Frankfurter Kreuz without changing skis.

==== Sawdust round ====
Located east of the Rennsteig Arena, parallel to the Oberhof-Grenzadler road, the Sägespäne-Runde (sawdust circuit) is divided into small and large circuits. Its name derives from early preparations when winter sports enthusiasts scattered sawdust in autumn, with morning hoarfrost enabling pre-winter ski training.

== Asphalt tracks ==
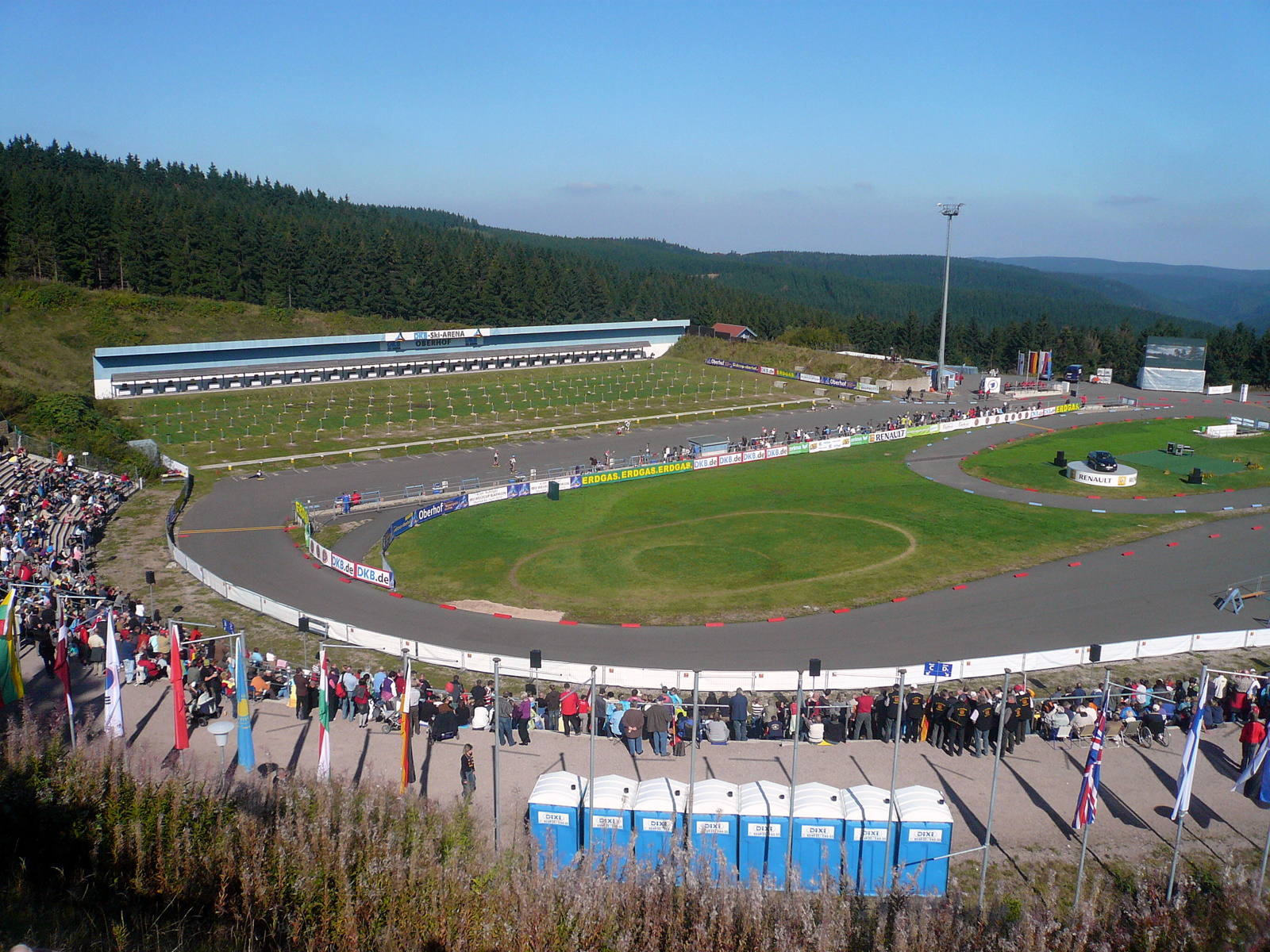
Ski arena at the 2009 Summer Biathlon World Championships

The Rennsteig Arena connects to a network of asphalt roller tracks, some floodlit, for summer training or competitions. High summer temperatures make the asphalt slippery, posing risks for athletes using ski poles and roller skis in bends.

Previously, there were three routes: the outer circuit (2,951 meters), the fountain circuit (1,878 meters), the large sawdust circuit (1,478 meters), and the small sawdust circuit (933 meters), also used in winter. A 544-meter connecting route links the Rennsteig Arena to the Grenzadler network, which includes five routes at 820 to 875 meters above sea level, with lengths of 1,668, 1,974, 2,774, 3,124, and 5,078 meters, all FIS-certified.

After three years of construction, ten renovated asphalt tracks were opened in 2022 for summer training, ranging from 1.5 to 4 kilometers. The Birxsteig was not asphalted for safety reasons.

== Competitions ==
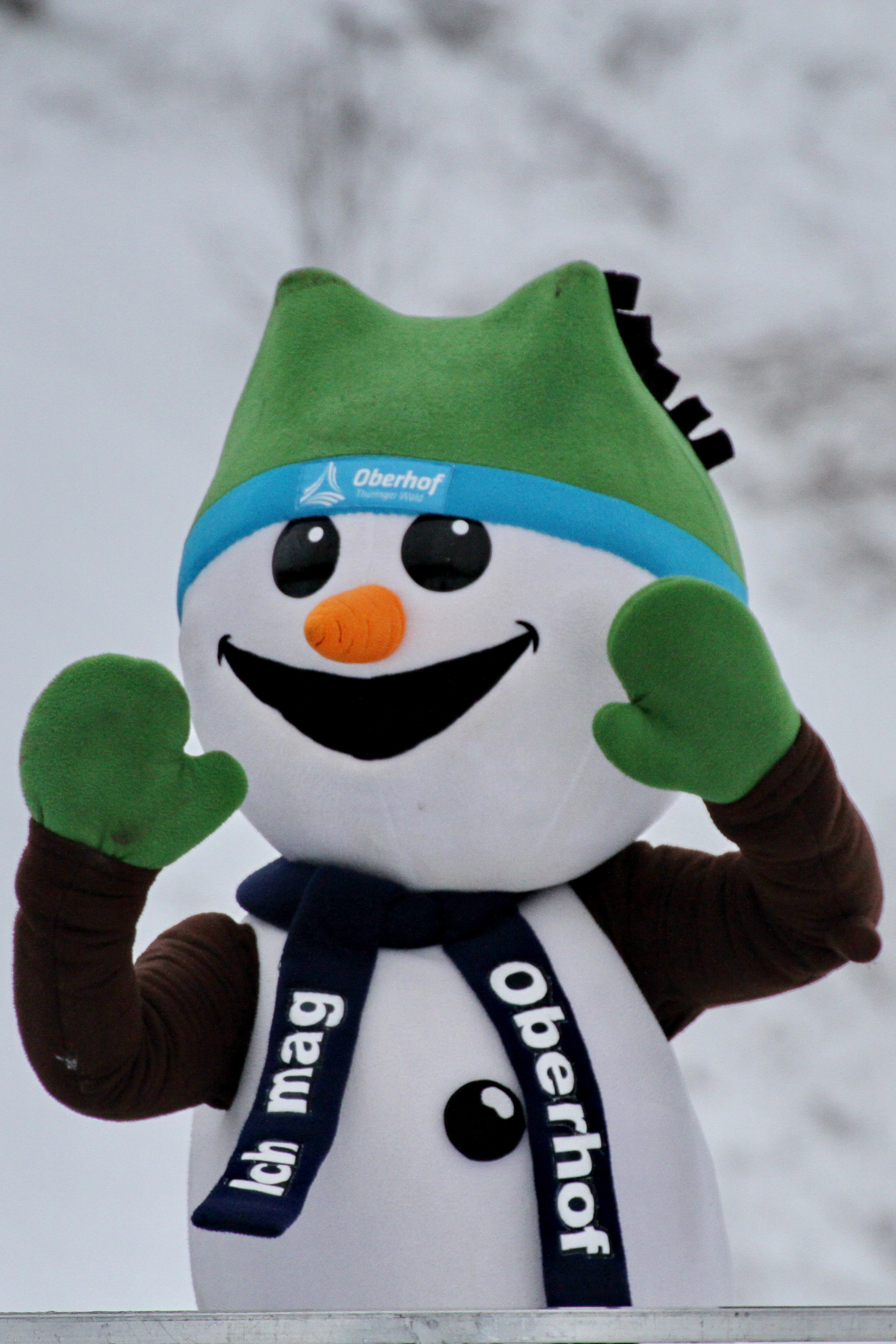
"Flocke", the mascot of the World Cup events in Oberhof

=== Biathlon ===
The first Biathlon World Cup was held in Oberhof in 1984, followed by events in 1985–1986, 1991, 1994, 1995, 1997, 1999–2003, and annually since 2005, except 2016. Due to the COVID-19 pandemic, two consecutive World Cup weekends occurred in January 2021, with the second replacing Ruhpolding to minimize travel. Since 2001, the event has been organized by the winter sports promotion association Rennsteig e.V. The Biathlon World Championships were held in 2004 and 2023. Events scheduled for 1990, 1993, and 2016 were canceled due to poor weather or warmth and held in Walchsee, Ridnaun, and Ruhpolding, respectively.

==== ORA Trophy ====
Since 1998, Oberhof has been part of the ORA Trophy with Oberhof, Ruhpolding, and Antholz, awarding additional prize money to the overall winner of the three World Cups. In 2004, the ORA was not held in Oberhof due to the World Championships, despite protests. Since 2005, it has been called the Golden Classics.

==== Night race ====
The first night race occurred during the 2006 World Cup, using the Ruhpolding method to illuminate the 4.3-kilometer course. Sections without permanent lights used 24 helium balloons, 2 to 6 meters in diameter, fixed at 10 meters high, primarily at the Birxsteig and Frankfurter Kreuz where television cameras were positioned. Daylight lamps on tree stands illuminated the shooting range, penalty loop, and remaining course, supplementing stadium floodlights.

==== Audience figures ====
Spectator numbers have increased steadily. The 2003 World Cup attracted 52,000 over four days, rising to 85,000 in 2005, 93,000 in 2006, 95,000 in 2007, 98,000 in 2009, and 102,000 in 2010, the record for Oberhof World Cups. The 2012 World Cup drew 100,500, 2013 drew 84,000 over four days, and 2014, reduced to three days, drew 62,500. Individual races typically attract over 20,000 spectators, with up to 27,500 in the stadium and along the track, including athletes, officials, and journalists. Races sell out months in advance, with limited track tickets available. The World Championships saw 206,000 spectators in 2004 over ten races on seven days and 152,000 in 2023 over 12 races on nine days, with an additional 50,000 attending evening award ceremonies in Oberhof's spa gardens in 2004.

==== Facts and figures ====
Hosting over 20,000 people is a challenge for a town of 1,600. At the 2006 World Cup, 750 helpers, including 450 volunteers from 13 Rennsteig winter sports clubs, ensured smooth operations. This included 140 referees, 50 competition stewards, and 120 car park and stadium stewards. The Grenzadler car park was closed to visitors, but 4,000 parking spaces and 120 bus spaces accommodated 12,000 spectators, with 24 shuttle buses transporting 6,000 from Friedensplatz to Grenzadler. Regular bus and train services were increased. Three hundred helpers supported logistics (police, catering, rescue services, security), with five ambulances and 2,000 meters of barrier fencing. A total of 3,400 people were accredited, including 180 from television, 30 from radio, 85 journalists, and 57 photographers.

==== Prize money ====
In 2006, €202,400 in prize money was distributed, with €162,400 from the IBU and €40,000 for the Golden Classics (€30,000 in Oberhof, €10,000 jackpot in Antholz). In 2007, €208,200 was distributed.

=== Other events ===
From 2002/2003 to 2009/2010 (canceled in 2006/2007), Nordic Combined World Cup running events were held, attracting over 10,000 spectators, the highest for Nordic Combined World Cups. The Summer Grand Prix in Nordic Combined occurred in 2007. The German Biathlon Championships are held annually in the summer.

The Tour de Ski (cross-country skiing) opening races were held from 2008/2009 to 2013/2014, and the Cross-Country Skiing World Cup occurred in 2002/2003 and 2023/2024.

Since 2006, the Special Olympics Germany cross-country skiing days have been held annually in mid-January, the largest such event in Europe for people with intellectual disabilities.

== Bibliography ==
- Hackel, Rolf (1993). Oberhof: Vom Hospiz der Johanniter zur Stadt am Rennsteig [Oberhof: From the hospice of the Knights Hospitaller to the town on the Rennsteig] (in German). Heinrich-Jung-Verlagsgesellschaft. ISBN 3-929164-12-4.
- Fritzsche, Wolfgang (1995). Oberhof (in German). Grünes Herz Verlag. ISBN 3-929993-51-1.
- Weigand, Hermann; Knoerzer-Suckow, Johanna (1999). Biathlon: vom Randsport zum Publikumsrenner [Biathlon: from niche sport to crowd favorite] (in German). Plenk. ISBN 9783927957206.
- Knapp, Jan (2004). 100 Jahre Wintersport in Oberhof [100 years of winter sports in Oberhof] (in German). Wintersportverein Oberhof 05.
- Zitzmann, Sieghart (1997). 1958/1998 – 40 Jahre Biathlon in Oberhof [1958/1998 – 40 years of biathlon in Oberhof] (in German). Bauer & Malsch GmbH.
