= Emanuel Lewenstein =

Dutch art collector

Emanuel Albert Lewenstein (5 December 1870 – 10 June 1930) was a Dutch-Jewish businessman and art collector from Amsterdam. As a director of his family's sewing-machine firm, he assembled a notable collection of modern art. The dispersal of the collection at auction in October 1940, months after the German occupation of the Netherlands, became the subject of prolonged restitution disputes in the Netherlands and Germany, which contributed to a major reform of Dutch restitution policy.

== Biography ==
Emanuel Albert Lewenstein was born in Amsterdam on 5 December 1870, the son of Adolph Lewenstein (1841–1907), a German-Jewish businessman, and Lea Joachimsthal (1840–1931), who came from a Dutch-Jewish family in Amsterdam. His father founded the sewing machine company A. Lewenstein (Naaimachinehandel v/h A. Lewenstein) in Amsterdam in 1868, which later grew into one of the largest suppliers to the Dutch clothing industry.

In 1901, Lewenstein married Hedwig Weyermann (1875–1937) in Bonn. The couple had three children: Helene (1902–1907), who died in childhood, Robert Gottschalk Lewenstein (1905–1974) and Wilhelmine Helene Lewenstein (1912–2007).

Emanuel had four siblings: Adolf Lewenstein (1869–1943), Rosa Lewenstein (1872–1944), Julie Lewenstein (1877–1944) and Betty Lewenstein (1880–1974). Siegfried Adolf was murdered in Sobibor, and Rosa and Julie were murdered in Auschwitz; Betty survived the war.

== Art collection ==
Emanuel Lewenstein assembled a substantial art collection with a particular emphasis on modern art. He acquired works from Dutch art dealers and artists, including the artist and art dealer Paul Citroen.

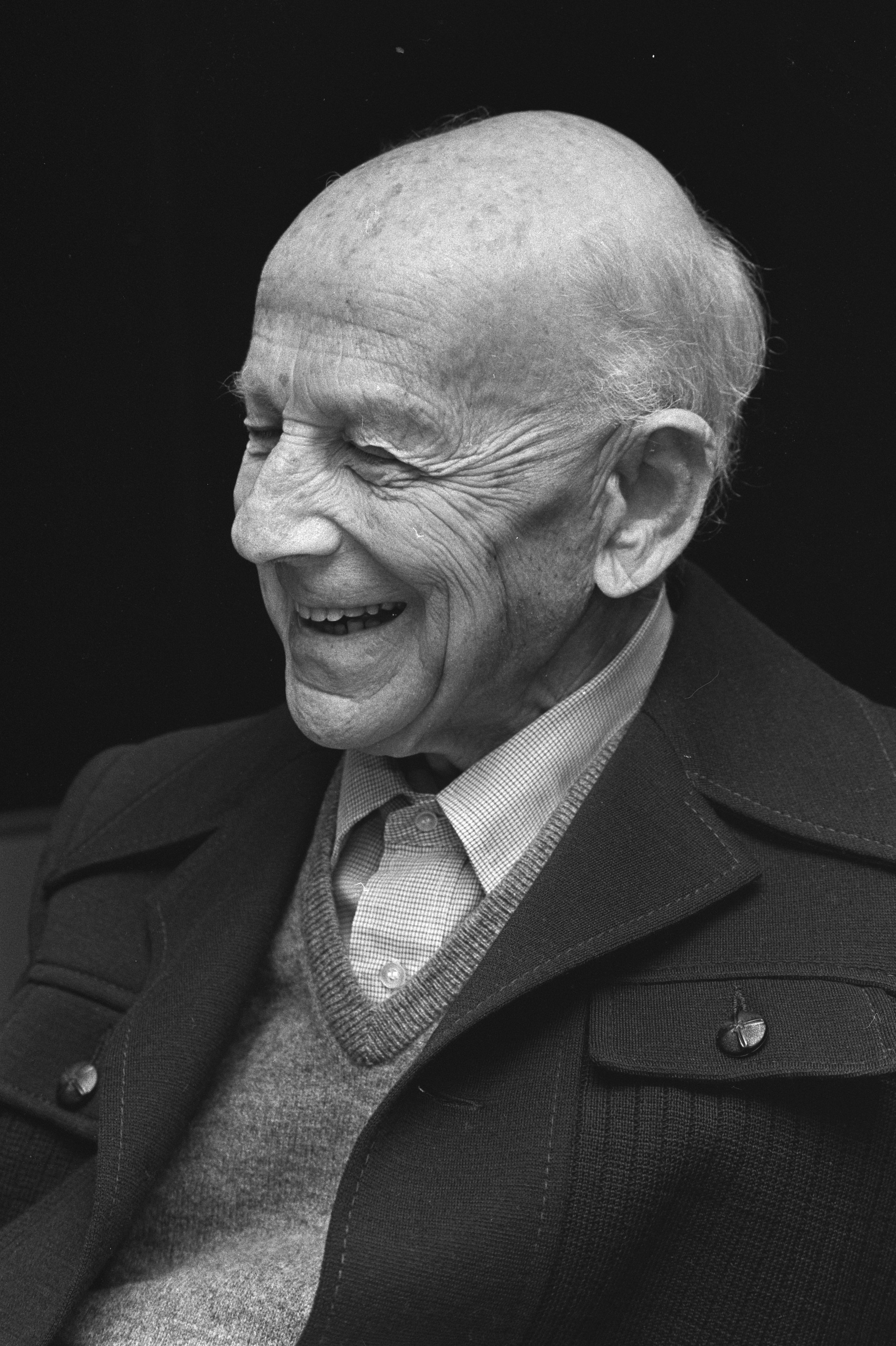
Paul Citroen, artist and art dealer, from whom Emanuel Lewenstein acquired works.

No catalogue or complete inventory of the collection is known to survive; its contents can, however, be largely reconstructed from the catalogue for an auction held by Frederik Muller & Co. in Amsterdam on 8 and 9 October 1940, at which the collection was dispersed. The collection comprised paintings, watercolours, pastels, drawings, etchings, lithographs, woodcuts, illustrated books and albums of reproductions, with several lots containing groups of drawings, prints or books.

Modern European art formed a substantial part of the collection. Among the works were two paintings by Wassily Kandinsky: Das bunte Leben (1907) and Bild mit Häusern (1909). Other artists represented included Eugène Carrière, Jean Metzinger, Edgar Degas, Käthe Kollwitz, Paul Citroen, Jan Toorop, Jan Sluijters, Lizzy Ansingh, Marius Bauer, George Hendrik Breitner, Anton Mauve, Jozef Israëls, Martin Monnickendam and Cornelis Vreedenburgh. The catalogue also listed numerous works by D. B. Nanninga, including landscapes, interiors, still lifes and drawings.

The collection also contained Dutch and European Old Master works. Artists named in the catalogue included Aert van der Neer, Adriaen van de Velde, Philips Wouwerman, Pieter Holsteyn II, Aert Schouman, Antonio Tempesta and Bartolomé Esteban Murillo. A group of prints was attributed to Rembrandt, including The Hundred Guilder Print and The Death of the Virgin.

Other holdings included architectural and topographical views, Italian landscape watercolours, English and American prints, and Japanese art, including a print by Utagawa Kunisada.

== Sale of the collection under Nazi occupation ==
On Emanuel Lewenstein's death in June 1930, his entire estate, including the art collection, passed to his widow, Hedwig Lewenstein Weyermann. After Hedwig died in May 1937, her children Wilhelmine and Robert inherited the estate.

When Nazi Germany invaded the Netherlands on 10 May 1940, both Robert and Wilhelmine had already left the country. Wilhelmine had emigrated with her Portuguese husband to Mozambique in January 1938, and Robert had resigned as director of the family sewing-machine firm in April 1939 and moved to the south of France with his new partner, Shirley Goodman; after the invasion the couple fled via Bilbao and Lisbon to New York, arriving in July 1940.

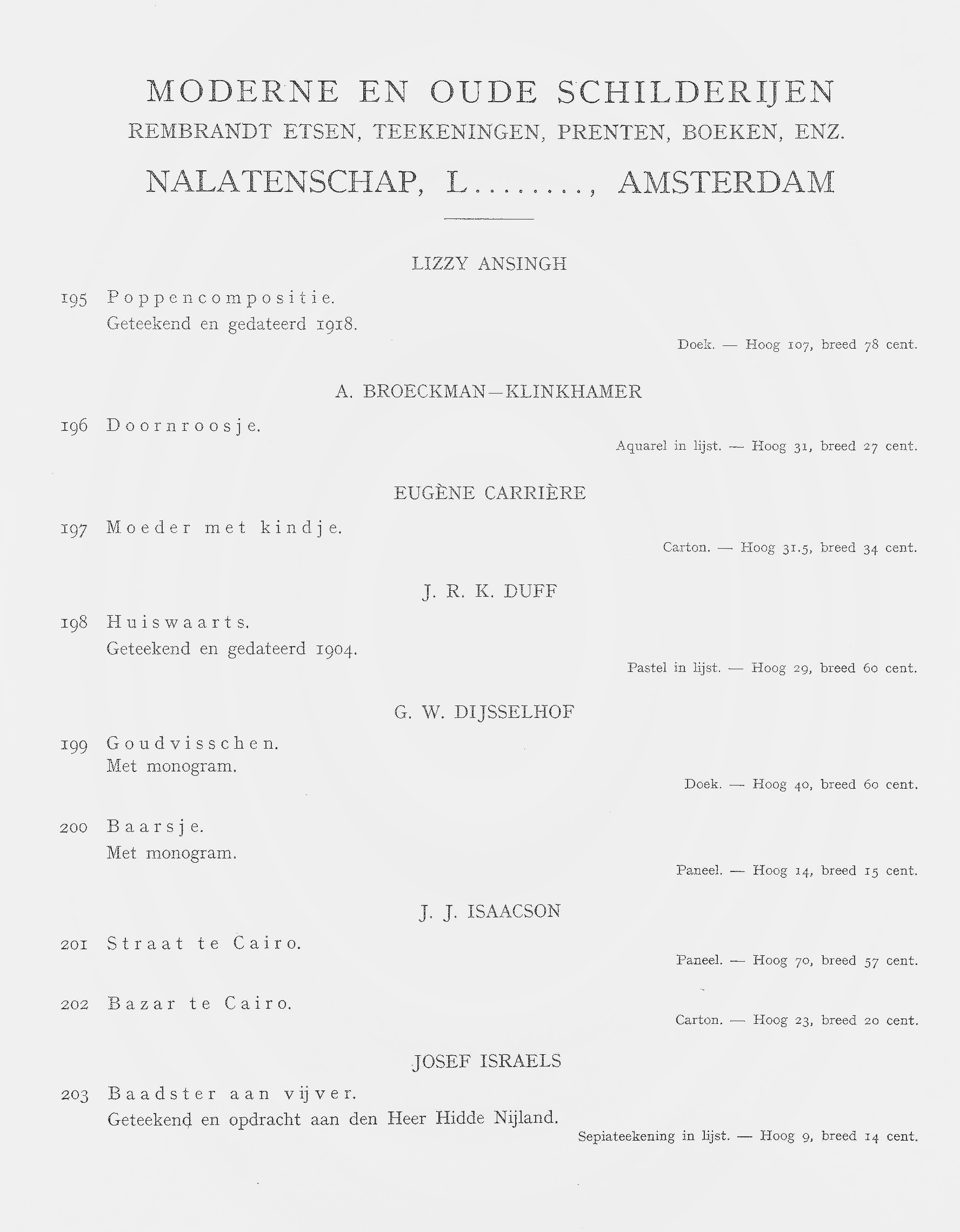
1940 auction catalogue in which Emanuel Lewenstein’s collection was anonymized as “Nalatenschap L”.

The only member of the family remaining in the Netherlands was Robert's estranged wife, Irma Lewenstein Klein, a Jewish actress who had fled Nazi Germany for Amsterdam in September 1933. Irma remained in Amsterdam throughout the occupation with her mother, who had likewise fled Germany; she was subjected to anti-Jewish measures and arrested on several occasions.

Five months after the invasion, the collection appeared at the auction house Frederik Muller & Co. in Amsterdam, listed anonymously as "Nalatenschap, L………, Amsterdam" ("Estate L………, Amsterdam"). It came under the hammer on 9 October 1940, the second day of a two-day sale that had opened with works from the collection of the Jewish art dealer Jacques Goudstikker, offered for the first time since the forced sale of his firm to Alois Miedl and Hermann Göring. Among the Lewenstein lots were two paintings by Kandinsky, Das bunte Leben and Bild mit Häusern, which decades later became the focus of protracted restitution proceedings in the Netherlands and Germany. Two months after the sale, in December 1940, the family firm was "Aryanized", and Robert and Wilhelmine's shares were transferred to a German administrator in 1942.

== Kandinsky's Das Bunte Leben ==
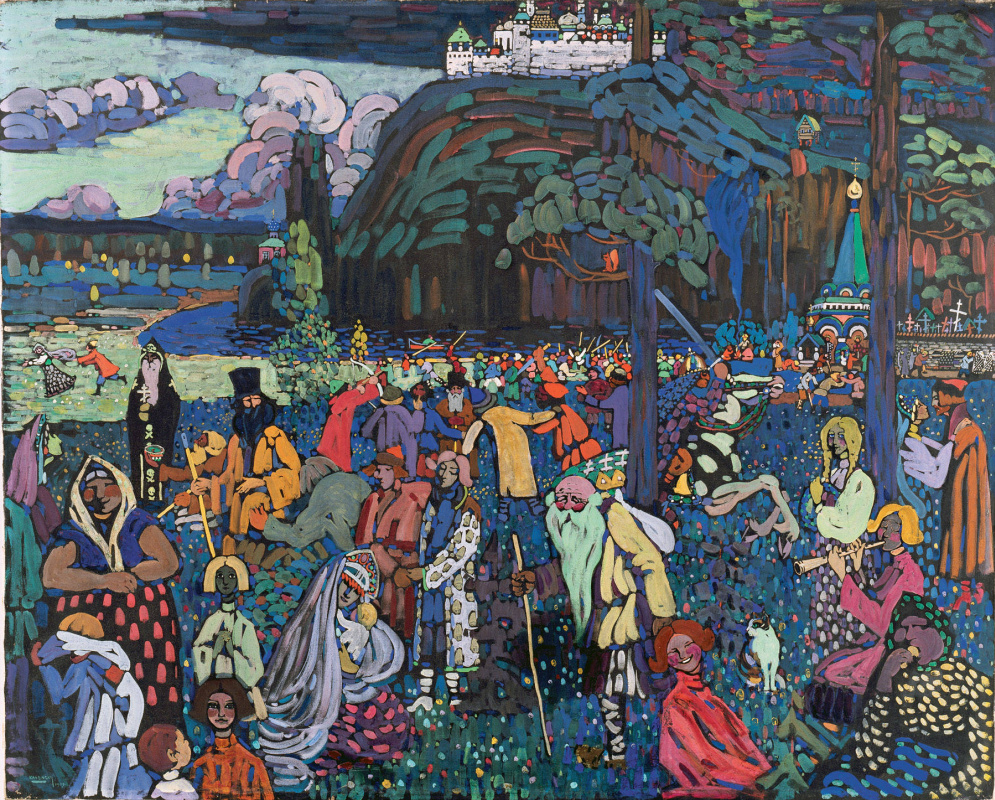
Das Bunte Leben (1907)

Das bunte Leben (The Colourful Life) is a tempera painting on canvas, measuring approximately 130 by 163 centimetres, which Wassily Kandinsky completed near Paris in 1907. Regarded as a major work of his early period, it presents a densely populated, brightly coloured vision of Russian life. Figures in traditional dress play music, court, pray and fight across a dark landscape, while a castle rises above the scene. Its folk imagery, decorative colour and loosely separated forms reflect Kandinsky’s engagement with Jugendstil while anticipating his movement towards abstraction.

Emanuel Lewenstein acquired the painting from Paul Citroen in November 1927 for 900 guilders. Following Emanuel’s death in 1930, his widow became its sole owner and placed it on loan at the Stedelijk Museum in 1933. On 5 September 1940, after the German occupation of the Netherlands, the painting was collected from the museum by a messenger sent on behalf of an unidentified party. It was then entered as lot 204 in an auction of works from the Lewenstein estate at Frederik Muller & Co. on 9 October 1940, where it was purchased by the collector Salomon B. Slijper.

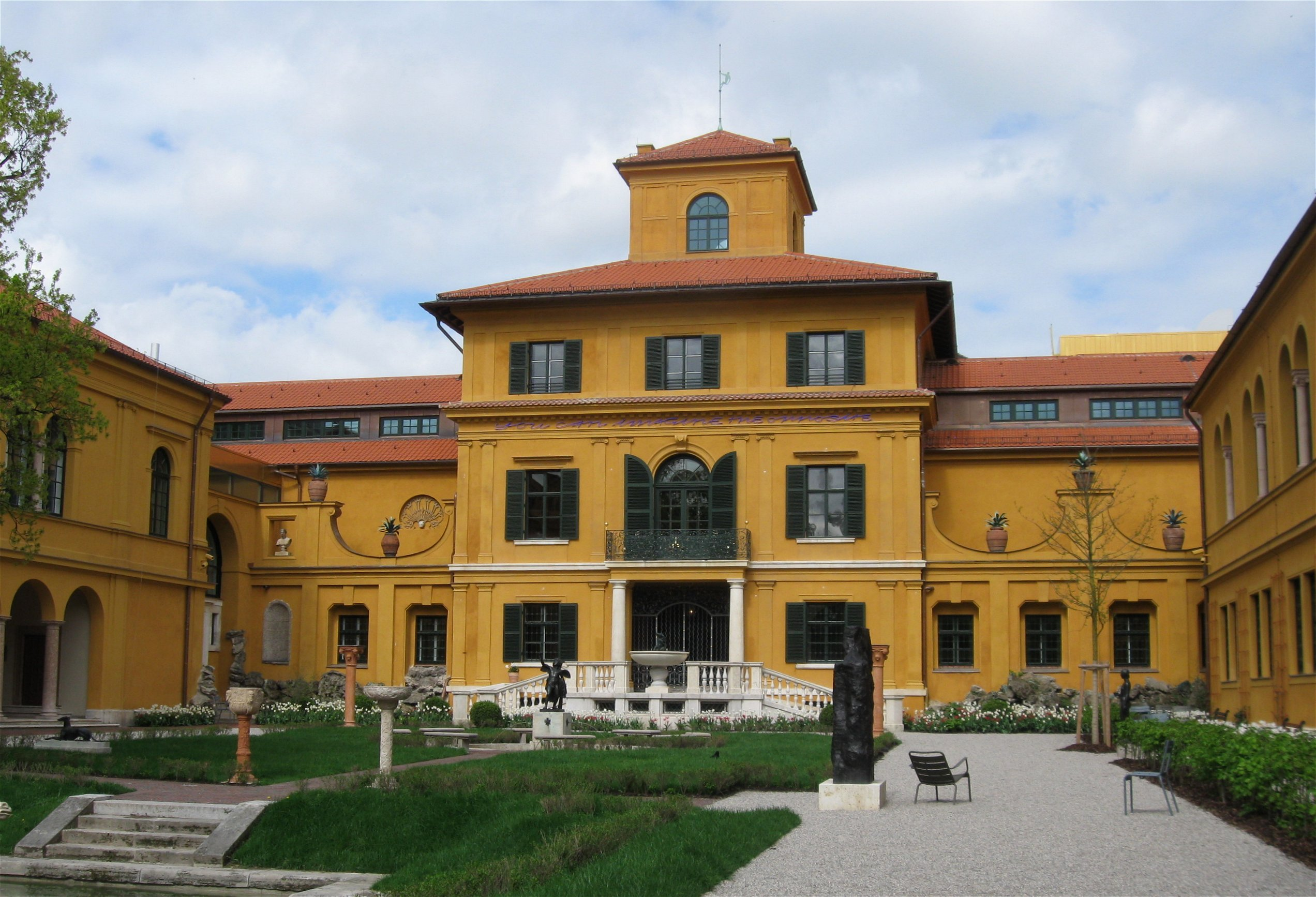
The Lenbachhaus in Munich, where Wassily Kandinsky’s Das Bunte Leben was displayed from 1972.

Slijper’s widow sold the painting to Bayerische Landesbank in 1972, after which it was displayed on long-term loan at Munich’s Lenbachhaus. Lewenstein’s descendants sought its return from the bank in 2015, but the bank rejected their claim. In March 2017, three heirs brought proceedings in New York seeking either restitution or damages of $80 million.

The dispute was subsequently submitted to Germany’s Advisory Commission on Nazi-looted cultural property. In June 2023, the commission concluded that the available evidence did not support Bayerische Landesbank’s contention that the painting had been voluntarily consigned for sale in 1940. Applying the presumption that losses suffered by persecuted Jewish owners after the German invasion of the Netherlands were involuntary, it recommended that the painting be restituted to the heirs of Hedwig Lewenstein Weyermann and Irma Lewenstein Klein.

== Kandinsky's Bild mit Häusern ==
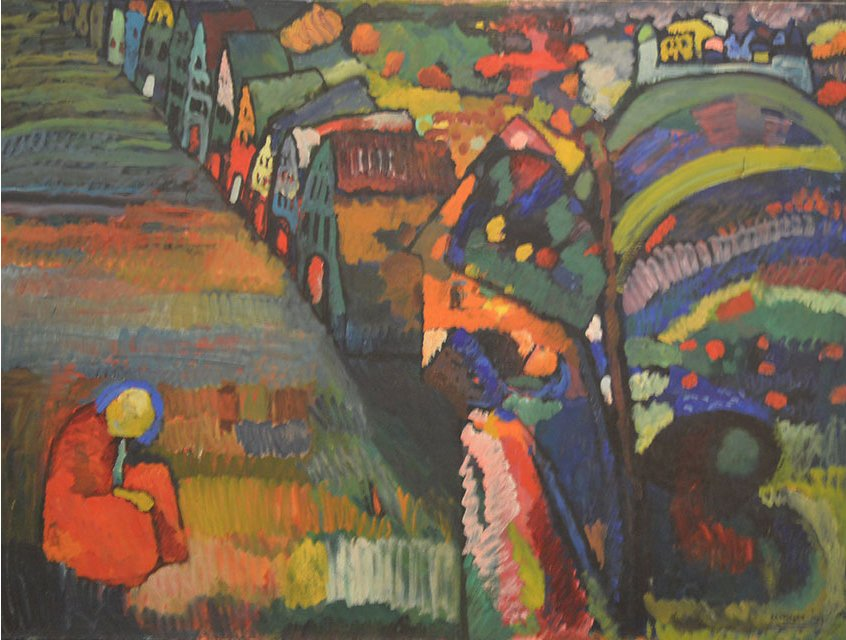
Bild mit Häusern (1909)

Bild mit Häusern (Painting with Houses) is an oil painting on canvas, measuring 97 by 131 centimetres, which Wassily Kandinsky completed in 1909. It depicts a figure in a brightly coloured, increasingly abstracted landscape, with houses, fields and curved forms arranged around a dark central path. Broad brushstrokes and intense, contrasting colours reduce the landscape to simplified areas of colour, reflecting Kandinsky’s movement away from naturalistic representation towards abstraction.

Emanuel Lewenstein acquired the painting from Paul Citroen in May 1923 for 500 guilders. Following Emanuel’s death in 1930, Hedwig became its owner. On 9 October 1940, during the German occupation of the Netherlands, the painting appeared as lot 205 in an auction at Frederik Muller & Co. The director of the Stedelijk Museum, David Röell, purchased it on behalf of the City of Amsterdam for 160 guilders, or 176 guilders including the buyer’s premium.

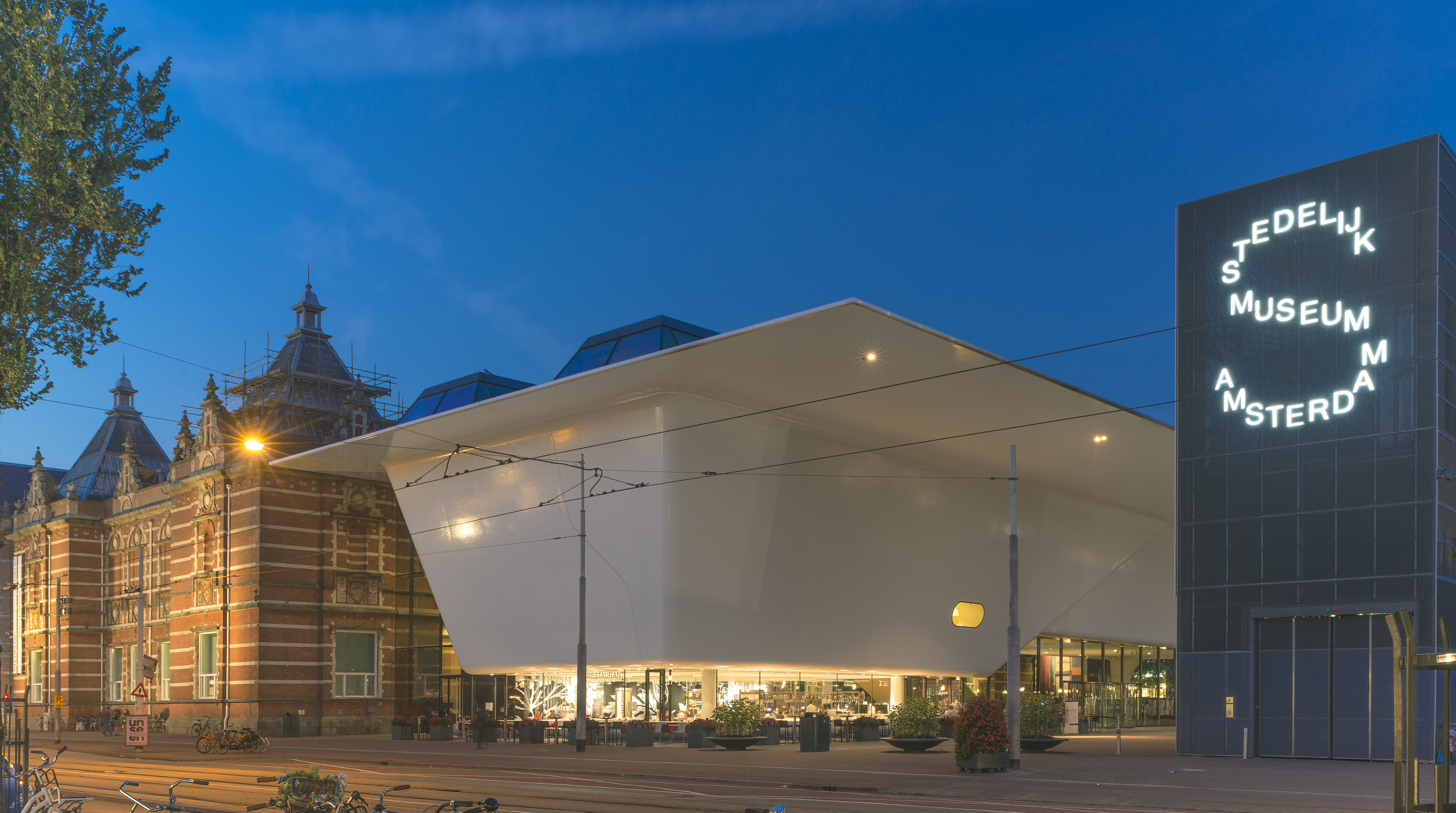
The Stedelijk Museum Amsterdam which acquired Wassily Kandinsky’s Bild mit Häusern at the 1940 auction.

Lewenstein’s heirs requested the painting’s return in 2012, and the dispute was submitted to the Dutch Restitutions Committee. In 2018, the committee concluded that the sale could not be considered separately from the Nazi regime, but found that it was also partly connected to financial difficulties predating the occupation. After weighing the heirs’ interests against the museum’s good-faith acquisition and the painting’s importance to its collection, it ruled against restitution.

The decision became a prominent focus of criticism of the Dutch policy for assessing claims for the restitution of Nazi-looted art, under which the interests of claimants could be weighed against those of museums. In December 2020, an independent evaluation committee chaired by Jacob Kohnstamm issued the report Striving for Justice, which criticised several aspects of the policy applied by the Restitutions Committee. It recommended that museum interests should no longer be weighed against those of applicants, stating that “meaningful redress for injustice must be the guiding principle” of restitution policy.

The Dutch government accepted this central recommendation and adopted a revised assessment framework in 2021. The new process removed the general balancing of interests and focused instead on original ownership and involuntary loss resulting from Nazi persecution. Against this background, Amsterdam City Council decided in August 2021 to return the painting without awaiting a new ruling by the Restitutions Committee. It was formally transferred to the Lewenstein heirs in February 2022.
