= Deutsche Kreditbank =

German bank

Deutsche Kreditbank AG
- Industry: Bank; Insurance
- Founded: 19 March 1990
- Headquarters: Berlin
- Key people: Sven Deglow (CEO), Tilo Hacke, Thomas Jebsen, Alexander von Dobschütz, Jan Walther
- Products: Credit cards; Loans; Savings; Brokerage; Insurance
- Parent: Bayerische Landesbank
- Website: www.dkb.de

Deutsche Kreditbank (DKB) is the second-largest direct bank in Germany with 5.8 million customers, fully owned by Bayerische Landesbank. In 2018 the company, with its parent company, ranked 7th on the list of the biggest banks in Germany.

The bank is located in Berlin and its infrastructure consists of a small number of branches. The focus on a selected group of customers including retail clients, business clients, and public clients are part of the bank's corporate.

== History ==
Old logo

Alternate logo

Deutsche Kreditbank was founded on 19 March 1990 as the first private bank in East Germany, and was set up as a stock corporation. One of the founders was Edgar Most, the last vice president of the Staatsbank (State Bank of the GDR). The share capital was held by the Staatsbank of the GDR, the Verband deutscher Konsumgenossenschaften, the Interhotels, the nationally owned Centrum Warenhaus, and VEB Synthesewerk Schwarzheide. On 1 April 1990, the bank began operations in the GDR with an opening balance of 286.5 billion East German marks. From the onset, Deutsche Kreditbank covered a broad spectrum of services, from business to retail customers. In its closing balance on 30 June 1990, the bank's own funds amounted to 11 billion East German marks.

On 21 June 1990 the debits of the Staatsbank were endorsed on DKB, and DKB's shares that were owned by the Staatsbank were transferred to the Treuhandanstalt. In the following years, the Treuhandanstalt bought the remaining shares from the founding shareholders until the beginning of 1993, when it became the sole owner of the DKB.

The majority of the deposit-taking business (especially corporate and retail banking), as well as a number of branch buildings and locations, were taken over by Dresdner Bank and by Deutsche Bank in the course of the currency union, and ran until 1993 under Dresdner Bank Kreditbank AG and Deutsche Bank Kreditbank AG until 1994. At the end of June 1990 DKB contracted the two joint ventures to administer its legacy loans, with Deutsche Bank Kreditbank AG managing about 89 billion Deutsche Marks and Dresdner Bank Kreditbank AG about 36 billion. According to the report of the Bundesrechnungshof (Federal Audit Office), the buyers received access to the branches, the customer base, and buildings of the GDR banks for preferential prices. In December 1990 Deutsche Bank bought DKB's stake in Deutsche Bank Kreditbank AG for 310 million Deutsche Marks, and 112 branches passed to Deutsche Bank. A subsidiary of Dresdner Bank paid 87.3 million Deutsche marks for 41 properties, including buildings that were formerly owned by DKB. A subsidiary of Deutsche Bank bought 74 properties for 164.4 million Deutsche marks. The auditors of the Bundesrechnungshof considered these "unreasonable low purchase prices".

When the Treuhandanstalt was closed on 31 December 1994, DKB was briefly owned by the Federal Ministry of Finance until the bank was sold to Bayerische Landesbank on 31 January 1995.

DKB is a member of the Association of German Public Banks, Association of German Pfandbrief Banks, Bankenfachverband e.V. and Allied European Financial Market Association (AEFMA).

== Corporate structure ==
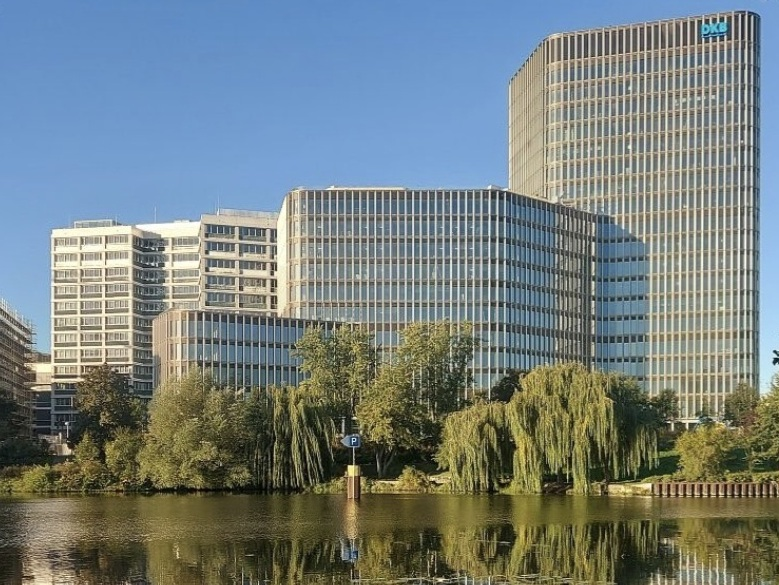
The new DKB building in Berlin

The bank runs 26 branch offices throughout Germany. The property subsidiary DKB Grund Gmbh is based in 15 of these locations.

On 1 January 2008 DKB took over the Miles & More-Credit Card which was previously issued by BayernLB in cooperation with Lufthansa.

At the end of March 2012 DKB Immobilien AG was sold to TAG Immobilien AG.

Since 14 June 2015 SKG Bank has no longer been an independent stock company, but a branch and brand of DKB.

== Issuer ==
DKB regularly issues its own bonds and covered bonds on the capital market. In 2016 the volume of the bonds on the market amounted to 10 billion Euro. The rating agency Moody's Corporation rated DKB's bonds Aaa, and its naked bonds A2. In 2016 DKB issued its first so-called Green Bond with a volume of 500 million Euro. This bond was positively rated by the sustainability rating agency oekom research (Second Party Opinion). In addition, the DKB Green Bond received a certification label from the Climate Bond Initiative (CBI).

== Service ==
The bank's best-known product is the Girokonto (account) DKB Cash. Other products and services on offer are private real estate financing, brokerage services, installment credits, and savings products.

The bank only runs a small number of ATMs but offers its customers free use of other ATMs. Since June 2016 the bank has charged fees for using ATMs in countries outside of the EU.

Since June 2014 DKB has collaborated with PayPal and offers its customers access to all their PayPal transactions via the DKB online banking portal.

DKB's focus is on the digitalization of banking. Since 2013 the bank has worked on this goal with respective service companies and fintechs such as Berlin-based FinReach for account changing services, Cringle for P2P-transactions via its smartphone app, and WebID Solutions for video identification procedures. The technology underlying the DKB banking app, with which customers can photograph, submit, and pay their bills, was designed by Gini.

Since 8 December 2014 DKB has offered existing clients pushTAN and chipTAN, two alternative options to the iTan procedure.

== Financial figures ==
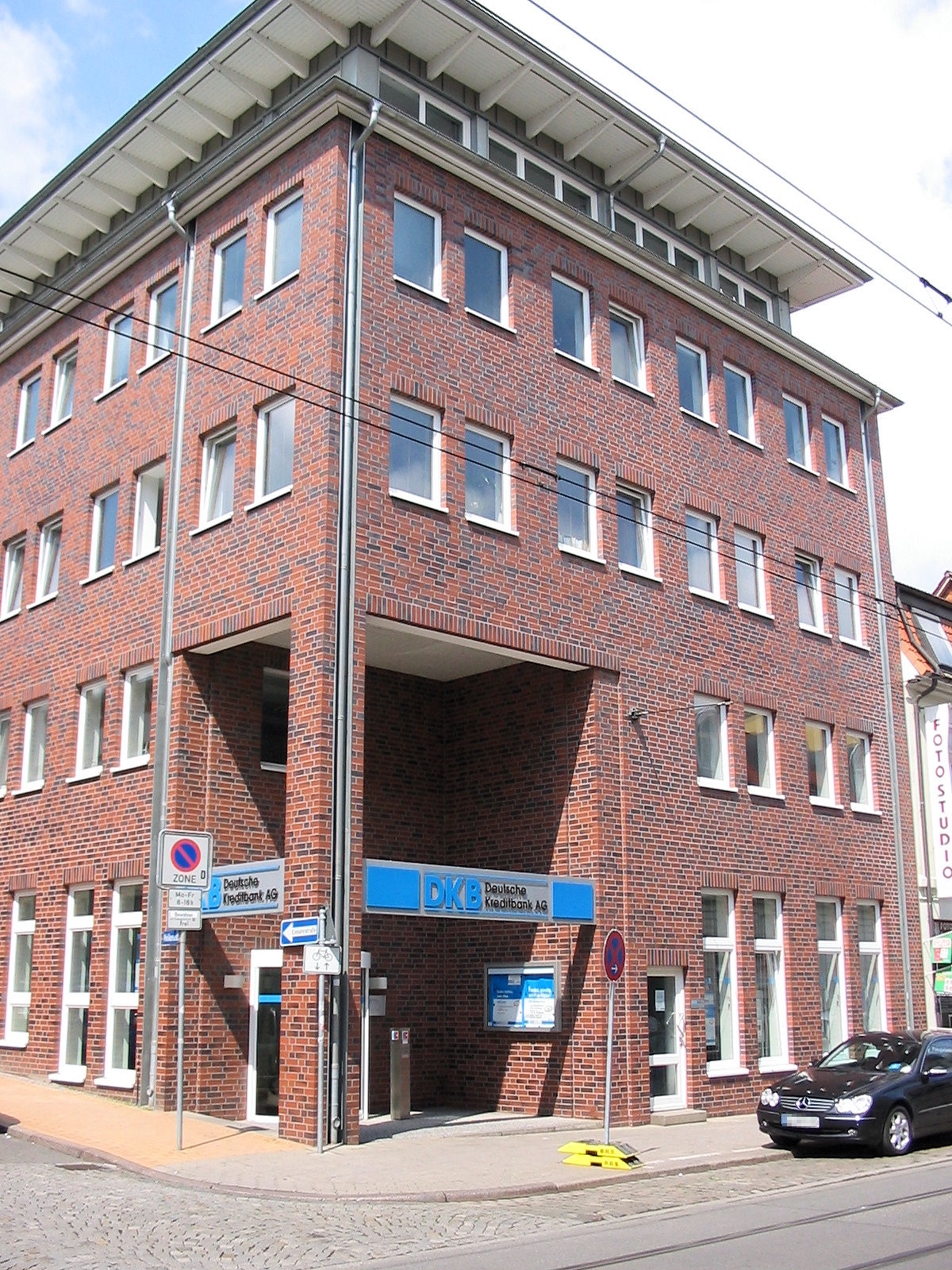
DKB building in Schwerin

Since 2005 DKB has provided consolidated financial statements. Since 2006 the International Financial Reporting Standards have been applied to the bank's billing processes.

Annual report	Billing	Total assets in million €	Result- before taxes in million €	Retail clients	Retail clients- growth	Staff
2008	IFRS	48.119	-21	1 520 000	117%	1.267
2009	IFRS	50.832	113	1 828 000	20%	1.738
2010	IFRS	55.183	165	2 101 000	15%	1.558
2011	IFRS	60.756	150	2 312 000	10%	1.780
2012	IFRS	66.761	223.4	2 589 729	12%	1.713
2013	IFRS	68.722	156.8	2 849 933	10%	1.748
2014	IFRS	71.587	150.5	3 071 434	8%	2.832
2015	IFRS	73.428	236.0	3 250 968	6%	2.937
2016	IFRS	76.522	331.2	3 518 055	8%	3.016
2017	IFRS	74.626	113.3	3 639 186	3.5 %	3.300

== Board of directors ==
The board of directors is currently made up of 16 shareholders and employee representatives:

Shareholder representatives

- Stephan Winkelmeier (chairman)
- Bernd Fröhlich
- Stefan Höck
- Michael Huber
- Marcus Kramer
- Ulrich Netzer
- Markus Wiegelmann
- Edgar Zoller

Employee representatives

- Bianca Häsen (vice chairman)
- Michaela Bergholz (labor union representative)
- Carsten Birkholz
- Christine Enz (labor union representative)
- Jörg Feyerabend
- Jens Hübler
- Maria Miranov
- Frank Radtke

== Personalities ==
These persons have previously had a mandate in the bank:

- Gerhard Gribkowsky, board of directors from 3 April 2007 until 10 April 2008
- Michael Kemmer, chairman of board of directors from 1 March 2008 until 14 December 2009, before member from 3 April 2007
- Siegfried Naser, board of directors from 9 March 2007 until 30 June 2009
- Franz Josef Pschierer, board of directors from 24 February 2009 until 24 March 2009
- Werner Schmidt, chairman of board of directors from 8 March 2006 until 1 March 2008, before vice chairman
- Günther Troppmann, chairman of board of directors from 1 March 1996 until 31 December 2012, before (since 1 March 1995) full member of board of directors

== Sponsoring ==
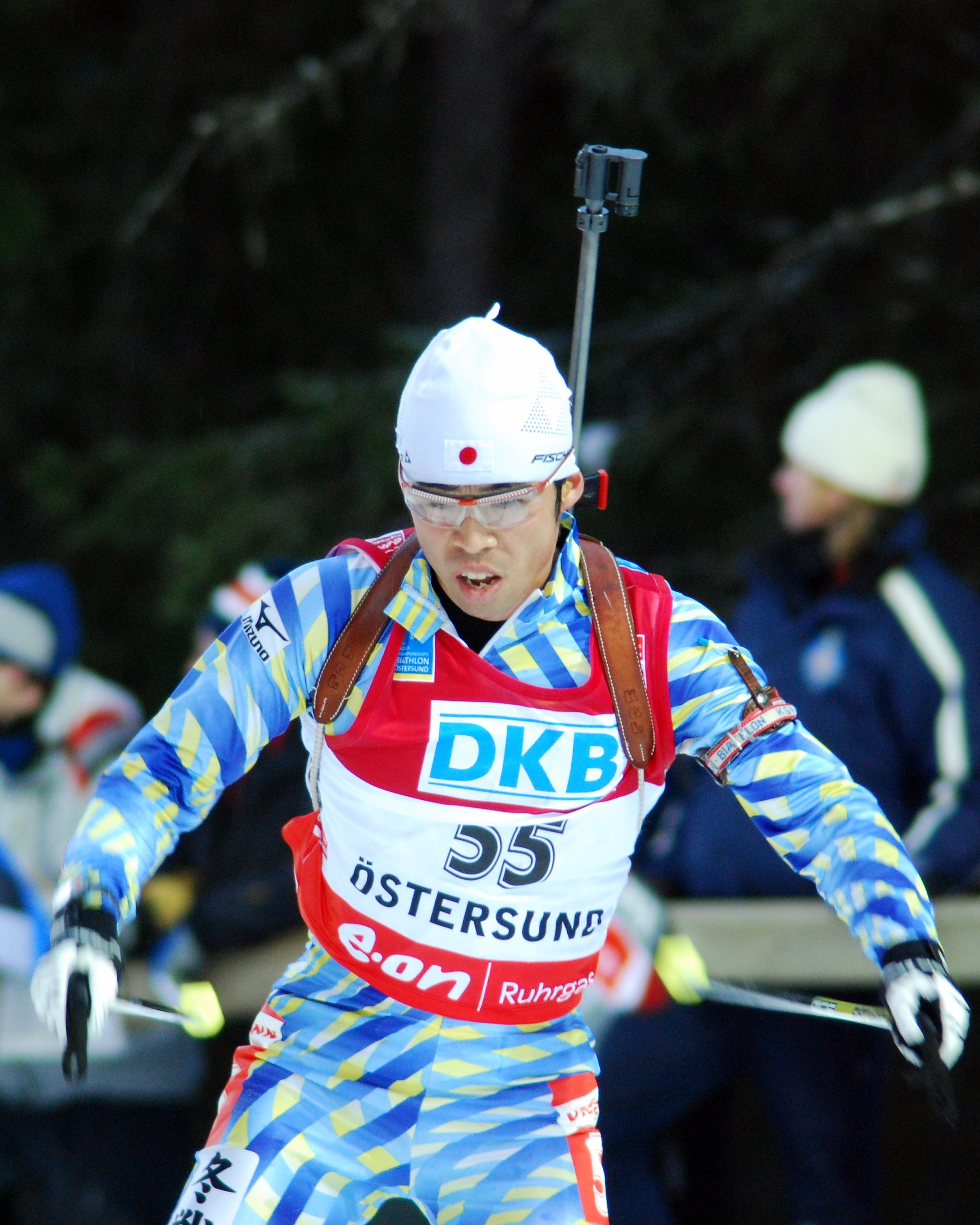
Sponsored Biathlete Tatsumi Kasahara

Logo of DKB-Arena

In October 2004 DKB founded the DKB Foundation for Social Engagement (DKB Stiftung für gesellschaftliches Engagement). The foundation runs heritage-protected sites such as Schloss Liebenberg. Since 2002 the bank has supported German top athletes, sports clubs, and leagues. Athletes from the local winter sports and athletic sports club come together to form the DKB team. In Berlin the bank is a sponsoring partner of the sports teams Hertha BSC, Alba Berlin, Eisbären Berlin, Füchse Berlin, and Berlin Recycling Volleys.

Since 2007 the bank has had naming rights for the Oberhofer biathlon stadium, the DKB-Ski-Arena. Until 2009 DKB was the main sponsor for ISTAF Berlin (athletics) and name sponsor for DKB-Riders Tour (show jumping). Since the 2012/2013 season DKB has been the naming sponsor of the Handball-Bundesliga and the 1. FFC Turbine Potsdam women's football club.

From 2007 to 2015, DKB was the sponsor and namesake of the DKB-Arena, today's Ostseestadion.

In 2017 the bank bought the exclusive live broadcasting rights of the 2017 World Men's Handball Championship for Germany after various negotiations by internet providers and TV channels with the rights owner beIN Media Group failed. The championship matches of the Germany men's national handball team were broadcast live via internet. It was the first time in Germany that a major sports event was broadcast by a single sponsor. Over the duration of the event, over 6 million visits to the website were recorded.

== Reporting ==
Since 2016, DKB has reported its annual sustainability activities according to the "Deutschen Nachhaltigkeitskodex (DNK)" guidelines.
