= Ostseestadion =

Football stadium in Rostock, Germany

Coordinates: 54°5′5.82″N 12°5′42.68″E

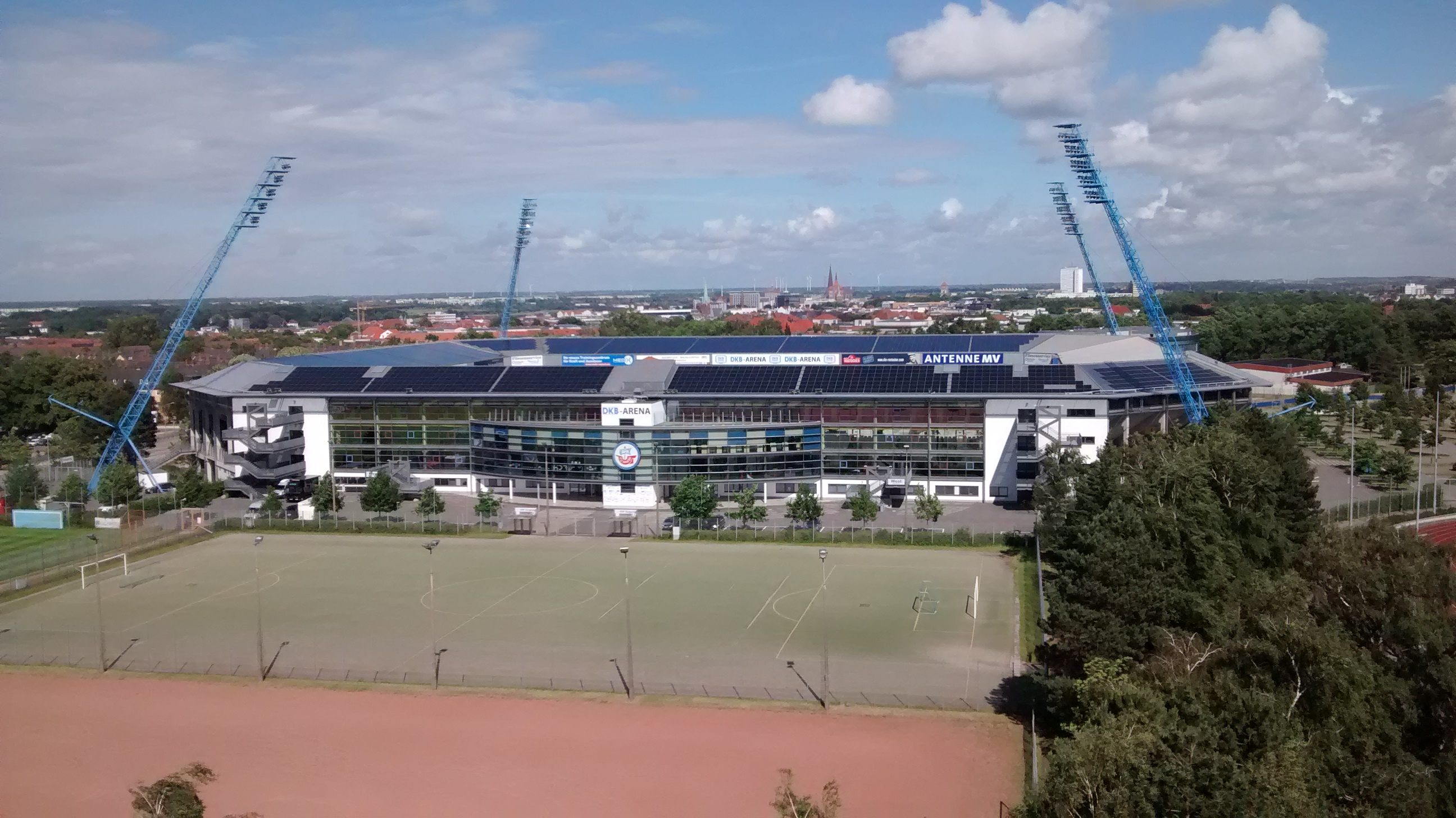
- Ostseestadion in June 2014
- Interactive map of Ostseestadion
- Full name: Ostseestadion
- Former names: Ostseestadion (1954-2007); DKB-Arena (2007-2015)
- Location: Rostock, Mecklenburg-Vorpommern, Germany
- Owner: Ostseestadion GmbH & Co. KG
- Operator: Ostseestadion GmbH & Co. KG
- Capacity: 17,000 (1954); 25,500 (1991 expansion); 29,000 (2001 expansion); 25,000 (seating)
- Surface: Grass
- Field size: 105m x 68m

Construction
- Groundbreaking: 1953
- Opened: 27 June 1954; 4 August 2001 (newly built stadium)
- Renovated: 1991; April 2000-August 2001
- Cost: 55 million DM (2000-2001)
- Architects: Beyer + Partner, Rostock

Tenants
- F.C. Hansa Rostock; Germany national football team (selected matches)

The Ostseestadion is the home stadium of FC Hansa Rostock, a German association football club, located in the city of Rostock. It has a capacity of 29,000.

"Ostseestadion" translates in English to "Baltic Sea Stadium", and is named after the Baltic Sea, whose coast Rostock lies upon. Ostseestadion is the original name of the stadium, but on 2 July 2007, Hansa Rostock sold the naming rights for the following 10 years to Deutsche Kreditbank (DKB), hence the new official name became "DKB Arena". In 2015, the club announced that the stadium was to regain its original name, and that the DKB had allowed an early renaming of the stadium and agreed to end the naming contract in advance.

== Location ==
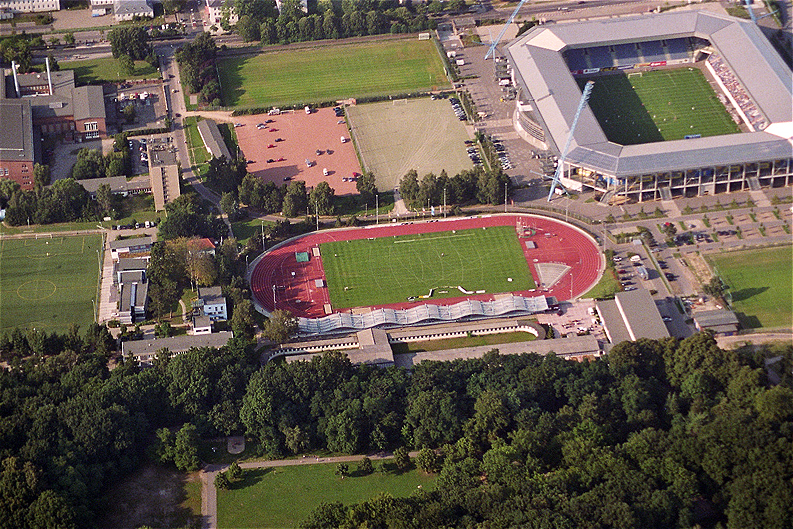
Aerial view of the Ostseestadion.

The Ostseestadion is located in the German city of Rostock in the state of Mecklenburg - Western Pomerania. Within Rostock, it is situated not far from the city centre in the Hansaviertel part of town near several hospitals of the University of Rostock and a small forest called Barnstorfer Wald'. Moreover, an ice hockey stadium as well as several training pitches of Hansa Rostock are just adjacent to the Ostseestadion.

The stadium can be reached easily from all parts of Rostock by public transport, using buses (stop Ostseestadion) or the S-Bahn (stop Holbeinplatz). Public transport is free with a valid ticket for a home match three hours before and two hours after the actual match.

== History ==
The stadium was newly built in 2001 on the site of a former stadium built in 1954. At the end of the 1960s a new 700 lux lighting system was added, which is still in use today.

== Seating ==
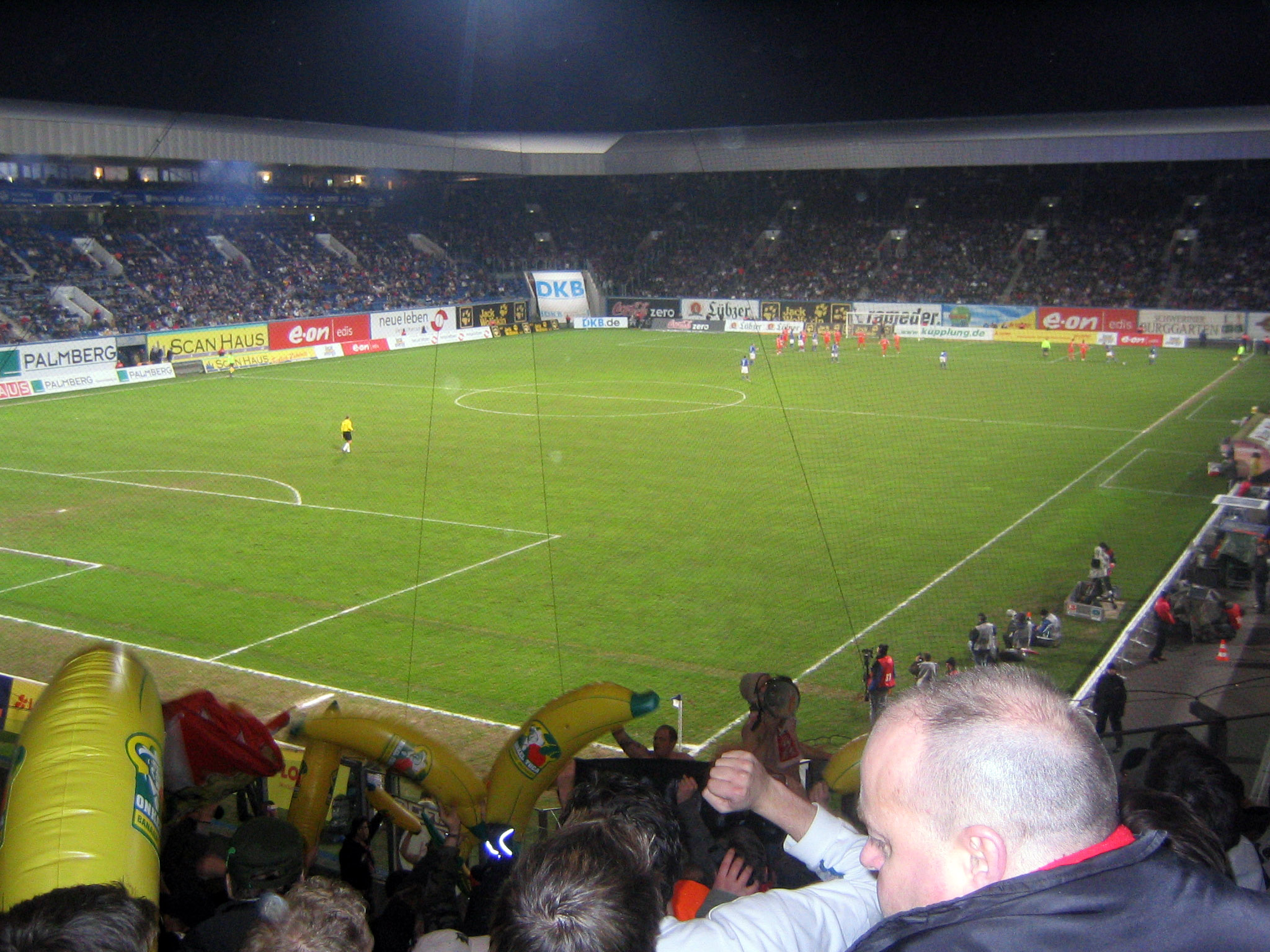
Interior in 2007

The total capacity of 29,000 places includes 1000 "business seats" as well as a standing capacity of 9,000. During international matches the 9,000 standing places can be turned into 5,000 seats thus allowing for an audience of 25,000. Moreover, there are 26 business lounges for premium partners and sponsors.

== Internationals ==
26 September 1954
GDR	–	Poland	0–1 (0–1)
29 June 1958
GDR	–	Poland	1–1
30 October 1960
GDR	–	Finland	5–1
9 July 1967
GDR	–	Egypt	7–0
6 September 1970
GDR	–	Poland	5–0
31 May 1972
GDR	–	Uruguay	0–0
23 May 1974
GDR	–	Norway	1–0
7 May 1980
GDR	–	Soviet Union	2–2
27 March 2002
Germany	–	United States	4–2 (1–1)
7 October 2006
Germany	–	Georgia	2–0 (1–0)

== Gallery ==
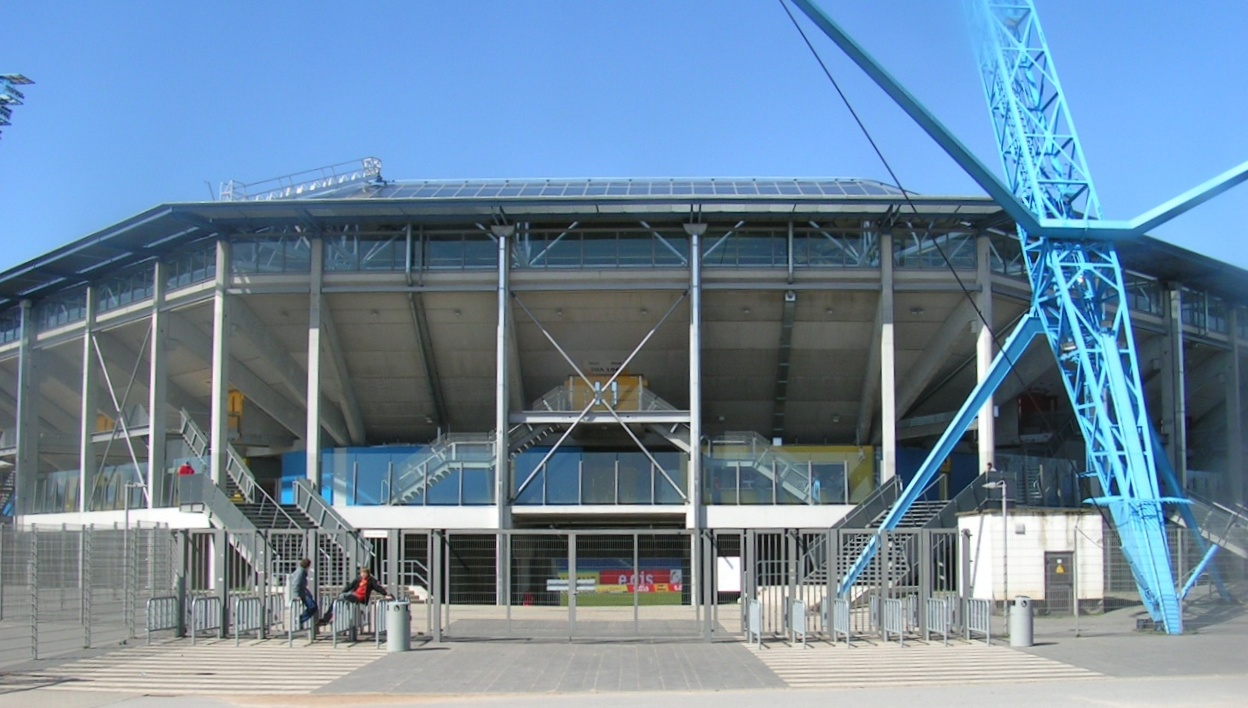
Main entrance

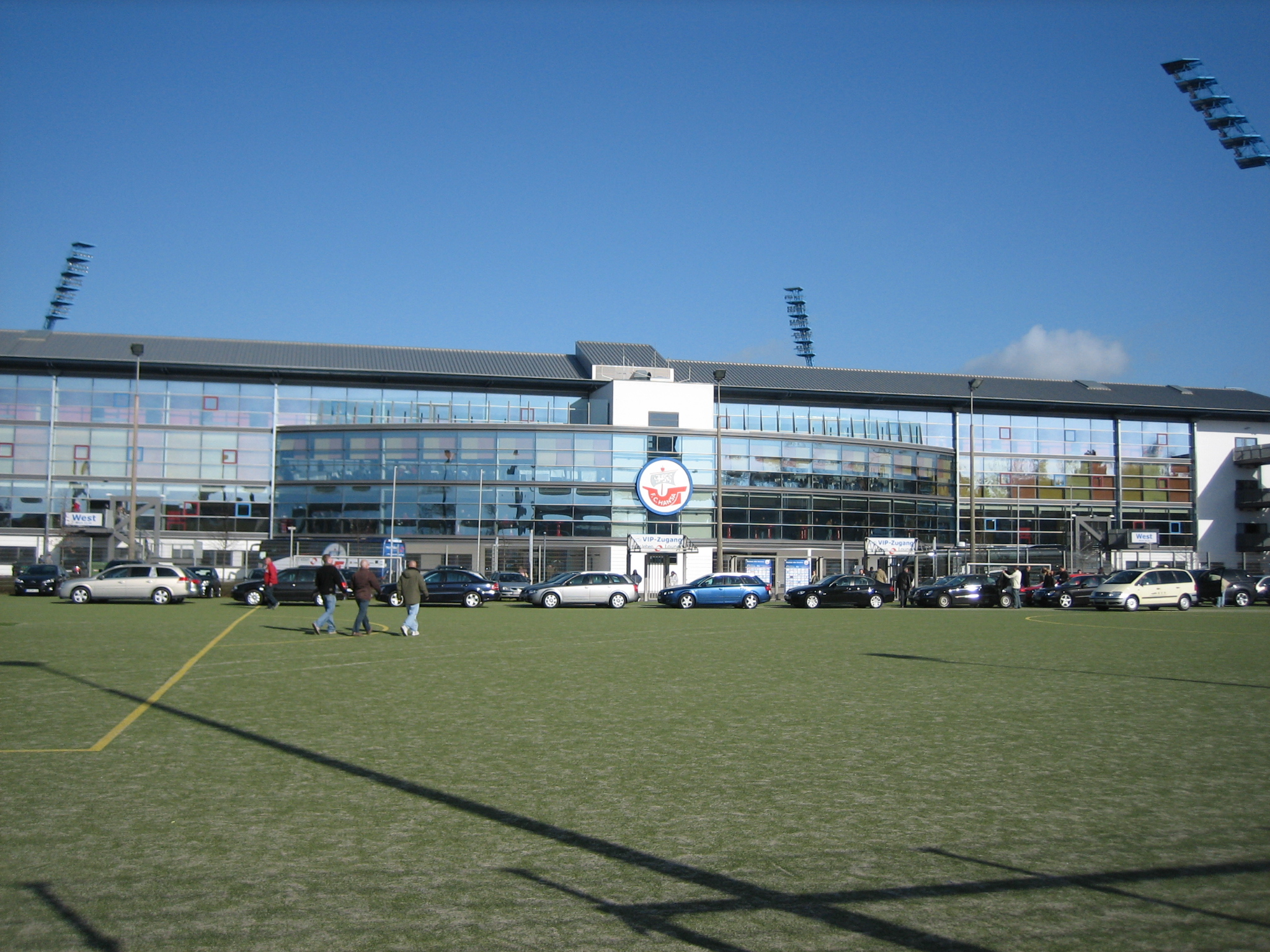
Rear entrance

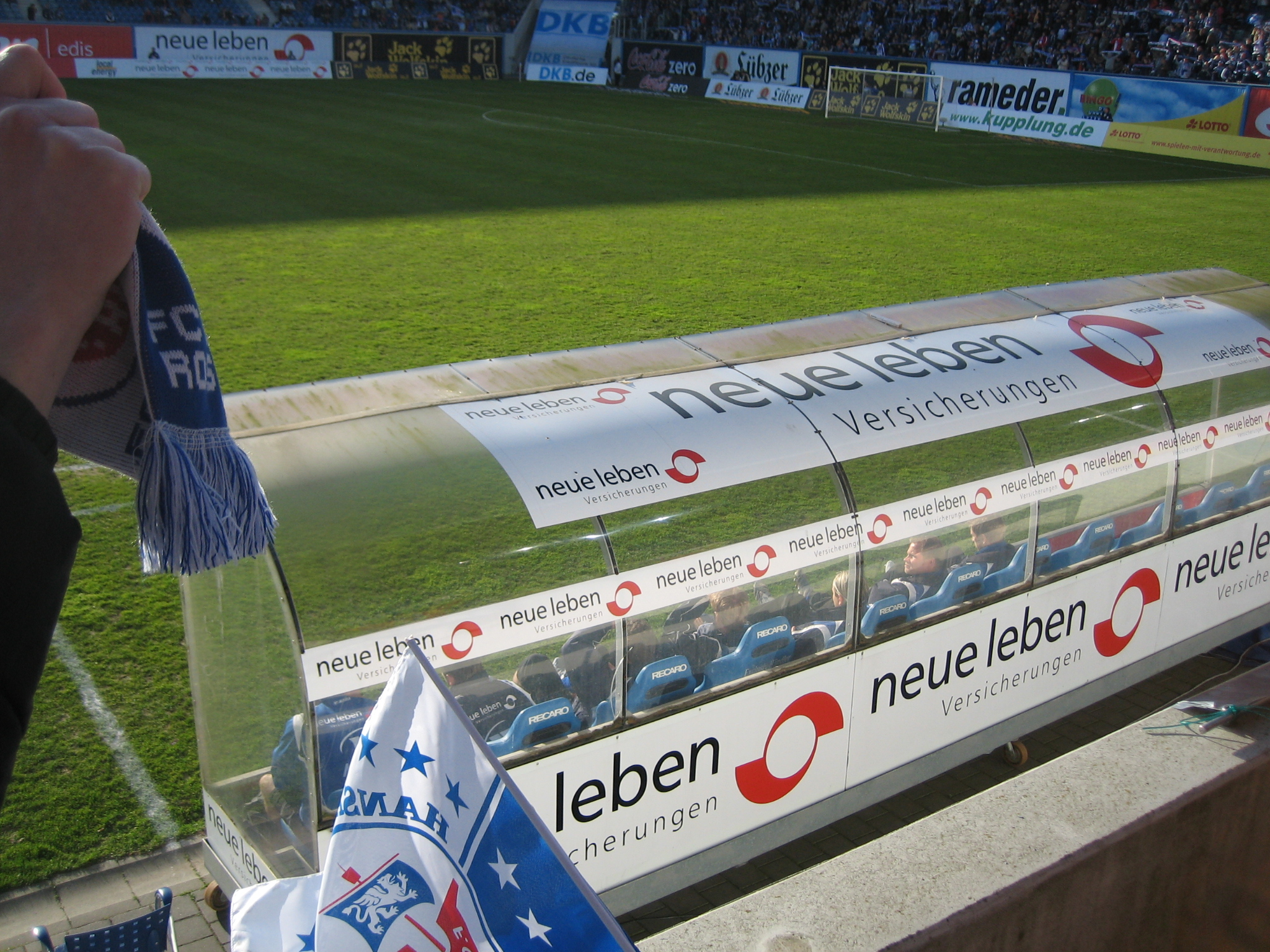
Interior

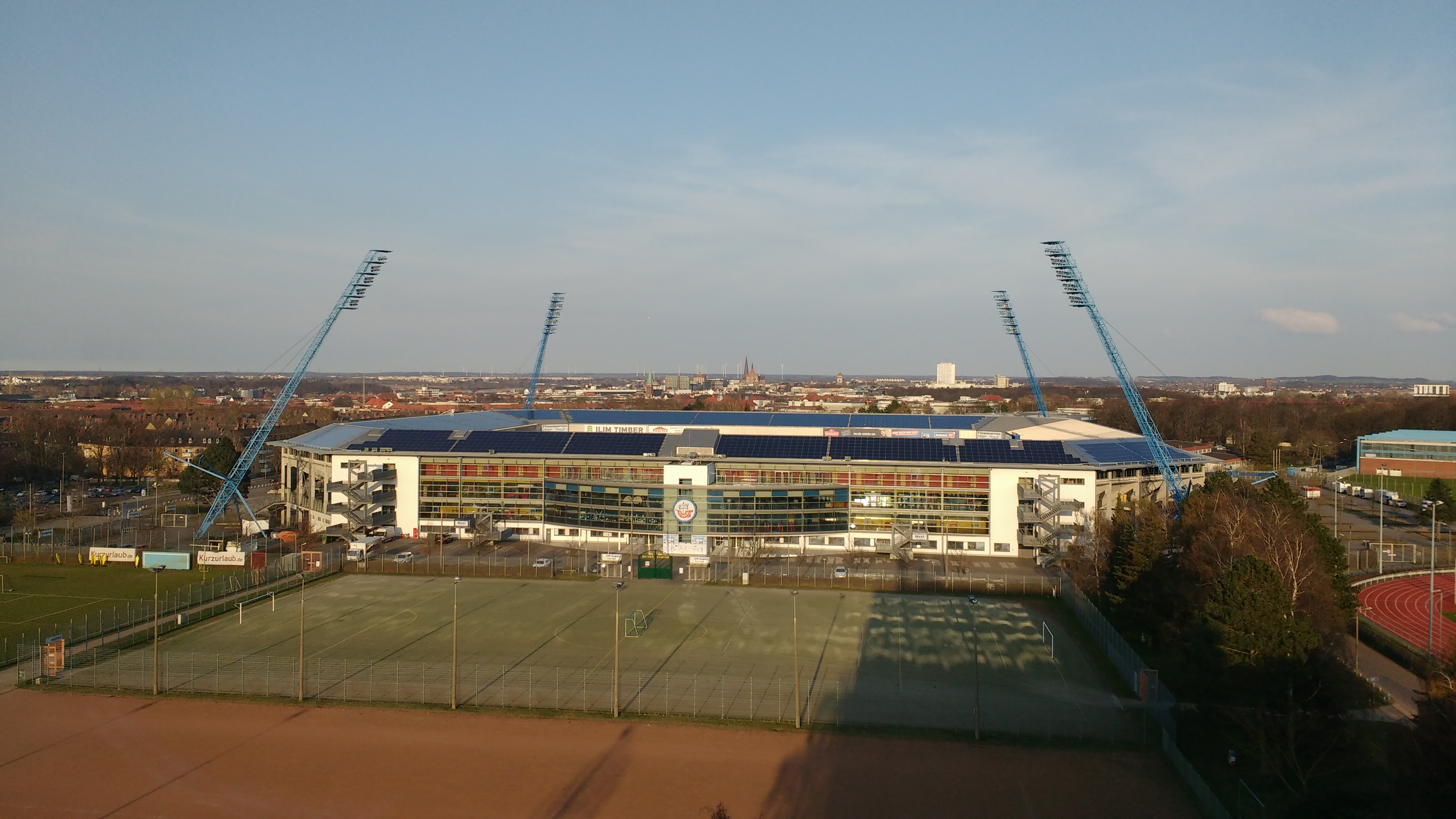
Ostseestadion in April 2016

Logo as DKB-Arena

== See also ==
- List of football stadiums in Germany
- Lists of stadiums
