= Bayerische Landesbank =

Public bank in Bavaria

- Type: Public bank
- Industry: Finance and Insurance
- Founded: 1972
- Headquarters: Munich, Germany
- Products: Financial services
- Website: www.bayernlb.de

Bayerische Landesbank, also known as BayernLB, is a publicly regulated bank based in Munich, Germany, and one of the six Landesbanken. It is 75% owned by the Free State of Bavaria (indirectly via BayernLB Holding AG) and 25% owned by the Sparkassenverband Bayern, the umbrella organization of Bavarian Sparkassen. With a balance of €285,70 billion and 7,703 employees (in the group; 3,343 in the bank itself), it is the seventh-largest financial institution in Germany.

BayernLB has been designated as a Significant Institution since the entry into force of European Banking Supervision in late 2014, and as a consequence is directly supervised by the European Central Bank.

== Main business activities ==
As a commercial bank, BayernLB Group offers private and commercial customers a universal range of services in private, industrial, investment and foreign business. This includes loans, securities trading and asset management, as well as mid-term and long-term bond issuance and securitization. The bank is refinanced through a variety of commercial debenture instruments.

As a state and municipal bank, BayernLB is responsible for comprehensive credit and financial counsel for the state of Bavaria and its municipalities and districts.

Through its subsidiaries, the bank is involved in a variety of further business areas. The Bayerische Landesbodenkreditanstalt is an organ of state housing policy. Through its full ownership of the Deutsche Kreditbank, based in Berlin, BayernLB is also involved in retail banking.

== History ==
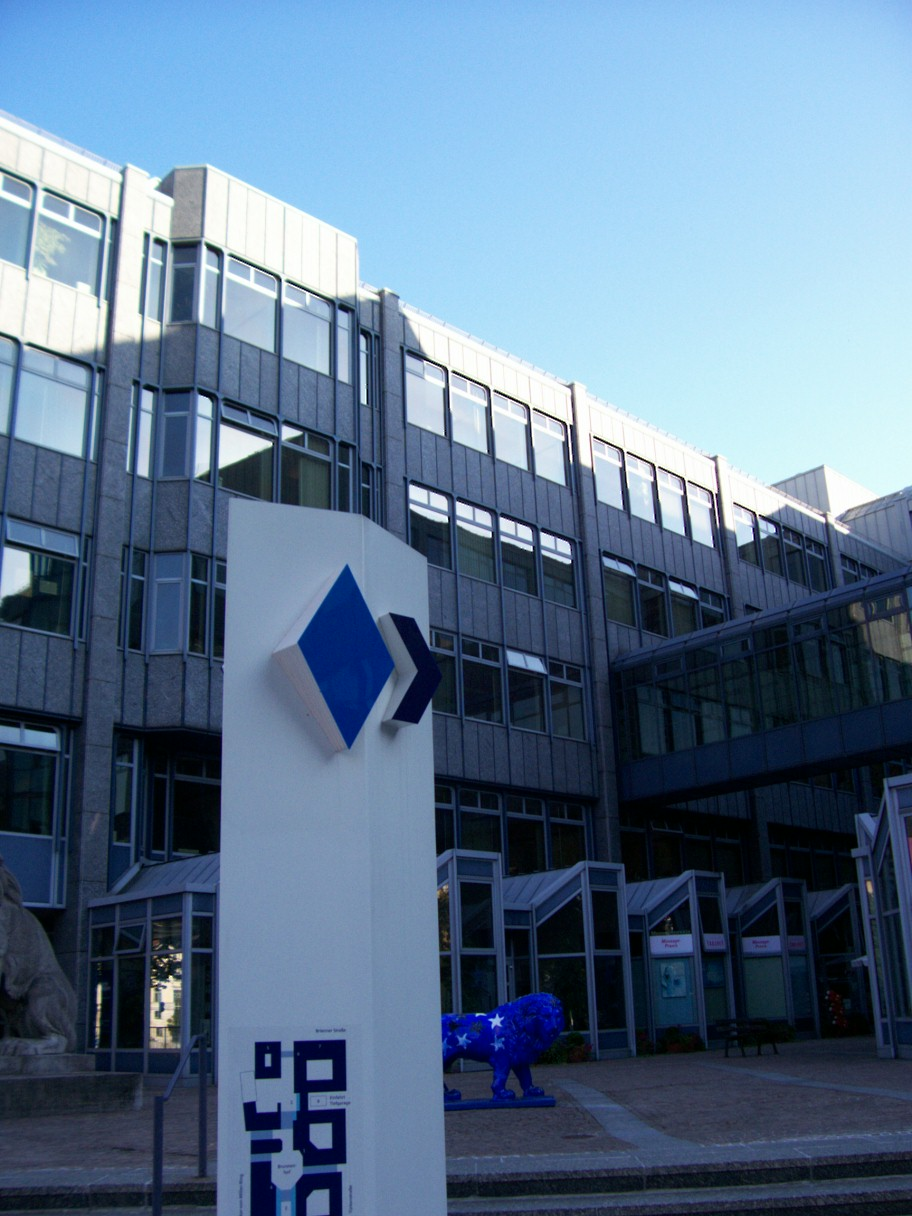
The Munich headquarters of the Bayerische Landesbank

Through its predecessor, the Bayerische Gemeindebank (founded 1914), and its much older subsidiary, the Bayerische Landesbodenkreditanstalt (founded 1884), BayernLB can claim to have more than 100 years of history. In its current form, the bank was founded by law on June 27, 1972, through the merger of the two institutions. Its first President was CSU veteran politician Karl Theodor Jacob. Later managers and Board members would also frequently be drawn from politics.

The bank expanded internationally in the 1990s, gaining toeholds in East Asia, Eastern Europe and the United States. Through the 2007 acquisition of a 50.01% share in Hypo Alpe-Adria-Bank International for a sum of €1.625 billion, BayernLB expanded its geographic presence to Austria and the Balkans.

== Involvement in the mortgage crisis ==
In early 2008 it was revealed that BayernLB had made large losses due to investments in sub-prime mortgage securities in the United States. Although the extent of these investments has been the topic of speculation, it was revealed from the company's Q2 2008 financial report that over €24 billion had been invested in critical securities, with losses of 2.3 billion euros in 2007 and a further 2 billion euros in the first quarter of 2008.

The heavy public criticism took its first toll in March 2008 when CEO Werner Schmidt resigned less than a week after the bank wrote down €1.9 billion as a result of the US subprime crisis. The crisis also consumed the governing CSU party and its chairman, Erwin Huber, who as Bavarian Minister of Finance was the acting chair of the bank's Administrative Council and was accused of covering up the extent of losses. The bank and the losses were major factors in the September, 2008 parliamentary elections, in which the CSU had its worst election result since 1962 and Huber resigned. Later that year, BayernLB became the first German financial institution to accept assistance from the federal government's €500 billion rescue package. The state of Bavaria injected 10 billion euros in capital into the lender and gave it €4.8 billion in guarantees for a portfolio of complex securities that turned sour after the collapse of Lehman Brothers. At the time, BayernLB agreed to repay 5 billion by 2019, while 5 billion euros would remain in the bank as part of Bavaria's 75 percent stake in the lender. Local savings banks own the rest.

The bank representatives advise economy was not ready for an increase in borrowing costs, and so the goal is to keep interest rates on hold. But it said it would end some of the measures it had introduced during the global downturn to increase the amount of money in the financial system. The German economy later recovered from recession but growth has flatlined since 2012. This is in stark contrast to more developed economies that fell into recession.

== Post-crisis developments ==
In 2010, BayernLB held preliminary talks over a possible merger with WestLB but discussions were broken off after only a few weeks. That same year, it became the first of Germany's bailed-out Landesbanken to return to profitability, making pre-tax profits of about 885 million euros. By 2014, BayernLB returned 2.7 billion euros to its state owner Bavaria; in 2016, it repaid another 1.3 billion euros. The final tranche of 1 billion euros was paid in June 2017.

In 2016, BayernLB entered into a partnership with Standard Chartered through which the latter will help finance Asian operations for German export-oriented small and medium-sized businesses.

BayernLB (Bayerische Landesbank) has concluded its EU state aid proceedings in June 2017 ahead of schedule, having repaid a total of almost 5.5 billion euros to the Free State of Bavaria. Under a ruling by the EU in 2012, BayernLB was required to pay a total of 4.96 billion euros to the Free State of Bavaria by 2019 at the latest. The early repayment of the last outstanding state-aid money was made possible by BayernLB's strong business performance and the solid capital base that goes with it. The responsible authorities (ECB, German Bundesbank, BaFin and the European Commission) also acknowledged BayernLB's financial stability by approving the payout of the silent partner contributions. As member of a protection scheme for Germany's Landesbanken, BayernLB had to pay 120 million euros for the NordLB rescue deal struck in February 2019.

== Controversy ==
In 2011, the bank's former chief risk officer was arrested after he received an alleged $50 million corrupt payment in connection with the bank's 2005 sale of a stake in Formula One motor racing.

In a 2012 suit filed in a New York court, BayernLB asserted that Deutsche Bank sold residential mortgage-backed securities to external clients while secretly criticizing them within the bank and ultimately profiting from their failure. By 2014, both banks agreed to settle the $810 million lawsuit out of court.

A number of legal cases over BayernLB's €1.63 billion acquisition of Hypo Alpe-Adria-Bank International Group AG in 2007 have marred relations between Bavaria and its southern neighbor Austria. In 2014, former chief executive Werner Schmidt was found guilty of bribing the late Austrian politician Jörg Haider to facilitate the acquisition. In what was the first case in Germany to put management board members on trial for overpaying for an acquisition, seven former BayernLB executives went on trial over claims they overpaid by €550 million when they purchased the majority stake of Hypo Alpe-Adria-Bank.

In June 2023, a German advisory panel on Nazi-looted art recommended a painting by Wassily Kandinsky in the bank's collection be restituted to the descendants of the Jewish family that originally owned the artwork. On July 24, 2023, BayernLB announced that it had decided to return the 1907 tempera painting, Colorful Life, to the heirs of Emanuel Lewenstein.

== See also ==
- Deutsche Kreditbank (DKB) (direct bank)
- German public banking sector
- List of banks in the euro area
- List of banks in Germany
