= Hélène Adant =

Russian-born French photographer

Hélène Adant (1903–1985), also known as Hélène Mossolova or Mossoloff, was a Russian-born French photographer. She started her career in France in the 1930s and worked with some of the leading French artists of her day.

== Biography ==
Adant was born in Khabin, Russia and named Elena Mossolova. Having emigrated to France in 1926, she attended the École des Beaux-Arts in Paris. It was here that she met, and later married, the engraver and sculptor, Henri-Georges Adam, in 1930. It was around the time of her marriage that Adant began her career as a photographer. The couple were divorced in 1945.

== Career ==
Adant began her career as an independent photographer working for publications in a variety of fields including art, tourism, museums and the decorative arts. Lydia Delectorskaya, Adant's cousin, was housekeeper and then model to Henri Matisse. It is probable that it was this connection that brought Adant into contact with Matisse. Adant is credited with reports on and photographs of Matisse working in his studio. The 2017 exhibition at the Royal Academy of Arts, 'Matisse in the Studio' and an article, 'Six Secrets from Matisse's Studio' written by Alice Primrose, contain references to images attributed to Adant.

Adant's work also included reports, documentaries and photographic portraits, taken in the studio of the printer, Fernand Moulot, of Marc Chagall, Joan Miro, Graham Sutherland and others.

The library at the French Institut National d'Histoire de l'Art (INHA) in Paris holds a number of her works, notably photographs of Henri Matisse, her travels to Russia and Russian woodcarvings.

== Legacy ==
Adant has left a sizeable array of photographic images of significant historical and cultural importance. Photographs attributed to her can be found in the Conway Library at the Courtauld Institute of Art in London. The main body of her photographic works resides mostly in France. Papers and manuscripts written by Adant on the life and work of Henri-Georges Adam and her own work during the time of their marriage is held at the Kandinsky Library at the Pompidou Centre, Paris, donated by Lydia Delectorskaya.

== Bibliography ==
- Matisse at Villa le Reve, Marie France Boyer and Hélène Adant, London, Thames & Hudson, 2004, ISBN 3716513903
- La Chapelle du Rosaire des Dominicaines de Vencel de L'Espoir, Henri Matisse, written by Norbert Calmels, Abbé Général des Prémontrés; photographs by Hélène Adant, Morel Editeurs, Paris, 1975, ASINB012EQO66
- Hélène Adant, L'oeil d'un photographe sur Matisse, Virginie Lemarchand, Isabelle Monod-Fontaine, Didier Schulmann, Paris, Ecole du Louvre, 2008
- Matisse in the Studio: An Introduction to the Exhibition for Teachers and Students, Lucy Chiswell, London, Royal Academy of Arts, 2017
