= Henri-Georges Adam =

French sculptor (1904–1967)

Henri-Georges Adam (14 January 1904 – 27 August 1967) was a French engraver and non-figurative sculptor of the École de Paris, who was also involved in the creation of numerous monumental tapestries. His work in these three areas is regarded as among the most extensive of the twentieth century.

== Early life ==
Henri-Georges Adam was born in Paris on 14 January 1904, to a father from Picardy and mother from Saint-Malo. During his childhood he spent his summers in Saint-Malo and Saint-Servan. In 1918, after attending a watchmaking school, Adam started working the studio of his father, a jeweler and goldsmith in the Marais district of Paris, where he learned to carve and later to engrave.

== Training and education ==
In 1925 Adam took evening classes at a drawing school in Montparnasse and after a stint at the École des Beaux-Arts in 1926, became a drawing professor of the Ville de Paris. Beginning in 1928, Adam began to make satirical sketches and political caricatures. "His spirit of cynical and apocalyptic derision is of the same nature as that of Rouault illustrating Miserere de Guerre. Anarchist, pacifist, antimilitarist, Adam reverses all taboos. He does not care about the myths of his country, of his family or his religion", notes Waldemar George (Adam, 1968, p. 30).

== Career ==
In 1934, Adam got involved with engraving, etching, the use of the burin and the environment of the surrealists, André Breton, Louis Aragon, Paul Éluard. He made his first exhibit in 1934, with a preface by Jean Cassou in 1936 after which he began his violently impressionistic engravings entitled, Désastres de la guerre, in response to the Spanish Civil War. In 1936, Adam joined the Association of Revolutionary Writers and Artists, where he met painters Maurice Estève, Alfred Manessier, Édouard Pignon, and Árpád Szenes. He took part, along with Picasso, Matisse, Rouault, Dufy, Fernand Léger, Chagall, Chaïm Soutine, Zadkine, Roger Bissière and Édouard Pignon in the exhibition Quatorze Juillet by Romain Rolland at the Théâtre de l'Alhambra, in which Picasso painted the curtain scene.

Adam tackled sculpting in 1942, and in October 1943 he, along with Gaston Diehl, Léon Gischia, Jean Le Moal, Manessier, Pignon, Gustave Singier, became one of the fifteen founders of the Salon du Mai. That same year, he created the sets and costumes, masks and two four meter-tall statues for Jean-Paul Sartre's Les Mouches which Charles Dullin assembled. Adam also carved Le Gisant, a tribute to the French Resistance and martyrs, which would be exhibited in the Salon de la Libération. Adam became friends with Picasso, who lent him his studio in the rue des Grands-Augustins where he worked more at ease until 1950. Between 1948 and 1949, at his Boisgeloup estate, near Gisors, he realized among other works, Le Grand Nu conserved by the Musée national d'art moderne.

In 1949, Adam presented a comprehensive exhibition of his works, frequently of women's sleek forms, at the gallery Aimé Maeght and in 1952 his copper engravings based on the year's theme of the Month, went on display in the bookstore-gallery La Hune. From 1950 to 1955, he was a professor of design at Antony, at a college which today bears his name. During 1950, he instructed many painters and sculptors (including Raphy).

From 1955, the first retrospective of Adam's work was organized at the Stedelijk Museum, Amsterdam. In 1956 and 1957, Adam developed one of his most famous suites of engravings, Dalles, Sable et Eau showing scenes of the sea, sand and granite of Penmarc'h, and a series of sculptures named Mutationes marines. He made new tapestries for the French Embassy in Washington in 1957, Meridien for the Palace of UNESCO in 1958, and Galaxie for Air France in New York City in 1961.

After a project for Monument du Prisonnier Politique Inconnu in 1951, Adam's Le Signal was erected in front of the Musée du Havre in 1961, the first of his monumental sculptures. The number of Adam's sculptures multiplied: Le Cygne blanc for the Lycée Charlemagne à Vicennes (1962), exposition of Obélisque oblique (1962) at the French Pavilion at the Exposition de Montreal, a set of sculptures and tapestries for l'église de Moutier in Switzerland, for which Manessier created the windows (1963–1967), Mur, a 22-meter-long wall, and La Feuille for the lycée de Chantilly (1965), Trois pointes effilées for the college-city of La Flèche (1965), a monument for Vichy (1960–1966), La Grande étrave for the house of culture of Thonon (1966), Fontaine for the city of Bihorel (1966), Le Minotaure for the college-city of Segré (1967), L'Oiseau de granit and La Grande Table de conférence for the lycée technique de Saint-Brieuc (1967).

In 1959, Adam was appointed professor of engraving at the École nationale supérieure des Beaux-Arts and later head professor of the workshop of monumental sculpture. He installed his own workshop and presses in La Ville du Bois, near Montlhéry while many of his exhibitions were presented in museums in France and Europe. In 1961, Adam developed a series of sculptures entitled Cryptogrammes. A retrospective of Adam's work was presented in 1966 at the Musée national d'art moderne in Paris with a foreword by Bernard Dorival. Three of his sculptures and the tapestry Penmarc'h were presented the following year in Montreal.

== Role as a war artist ==
Mobilized in 1939 and taken prisoner, Adam was assigned as the auxiliary nurse at the hospital Saint-Jacques de Besançon, where he made many drawings of surgeons, soldiers and the wounded. He was eventually released at the end of 1940.

== Personal life ==
Adam met Russian émigrée photographer Hélène Adant while they were both students at l’Ecole des beaux-Arts de Paris, they were married in 1930 until 1945. A collection of papers, manuscripts, and letters by Adant on Adam's work and her work at the time of their marriage are held at the Bibliothèque Kandinsky, Centre Pompidou, Paris. The collection was donated by Adant's cousin and housekeeper and model for Matisse, Lydia Delectorskaya.

In the middle of a creative whirlwind, Adam died from a heart attack on 27 August 1967, at La Clarté near Perros-Guirec, and lies in the cemetery of Mont-Saint-Michel, the theme of his last tapestry.

== Bibliography ==
- Adam, Œuvre gravé 1939-1957, foreword by Bernard Gheerbrant, La Hune, Paris, 1957.
- Adam, foreword by Jean Cassou, [with a catalogue of his works from 1927 to 1961], Musée des Beaux-Arts, Rouen, 1961.
- Adam, foreword by Bernard Dorival, Musee National d'Art Moderne, Paris, 1966.
- À la rencontre d'Adam, Hôtel de la Monnaie, Paris, 1968.
- Waldemar George and Ionel Jianou, Adam, texts by Roger Avermeate, René Barotte, Jean Cassou, Raymond Cogniat, Pierre Dehaye, Frank Elgar, A. Kuenzi, Jean Lescure, George Lombard, Pierre Moinot, G. Palthey, Theodore Van Velzen and Yvette Henri-Georges Adam [with a catalogue of his sculptures and medals from 1931 to 1967], Arted, Editions d'art, Paris, 1968.
- Ionel Jianou, Gérard Xuriguera, Aube Lardera, La sculpture moderne en France Arted, Editions d'art, Paris, 1982.
