= Wassily Kandinsky =

Russian painter and art theorist (1866–1944)

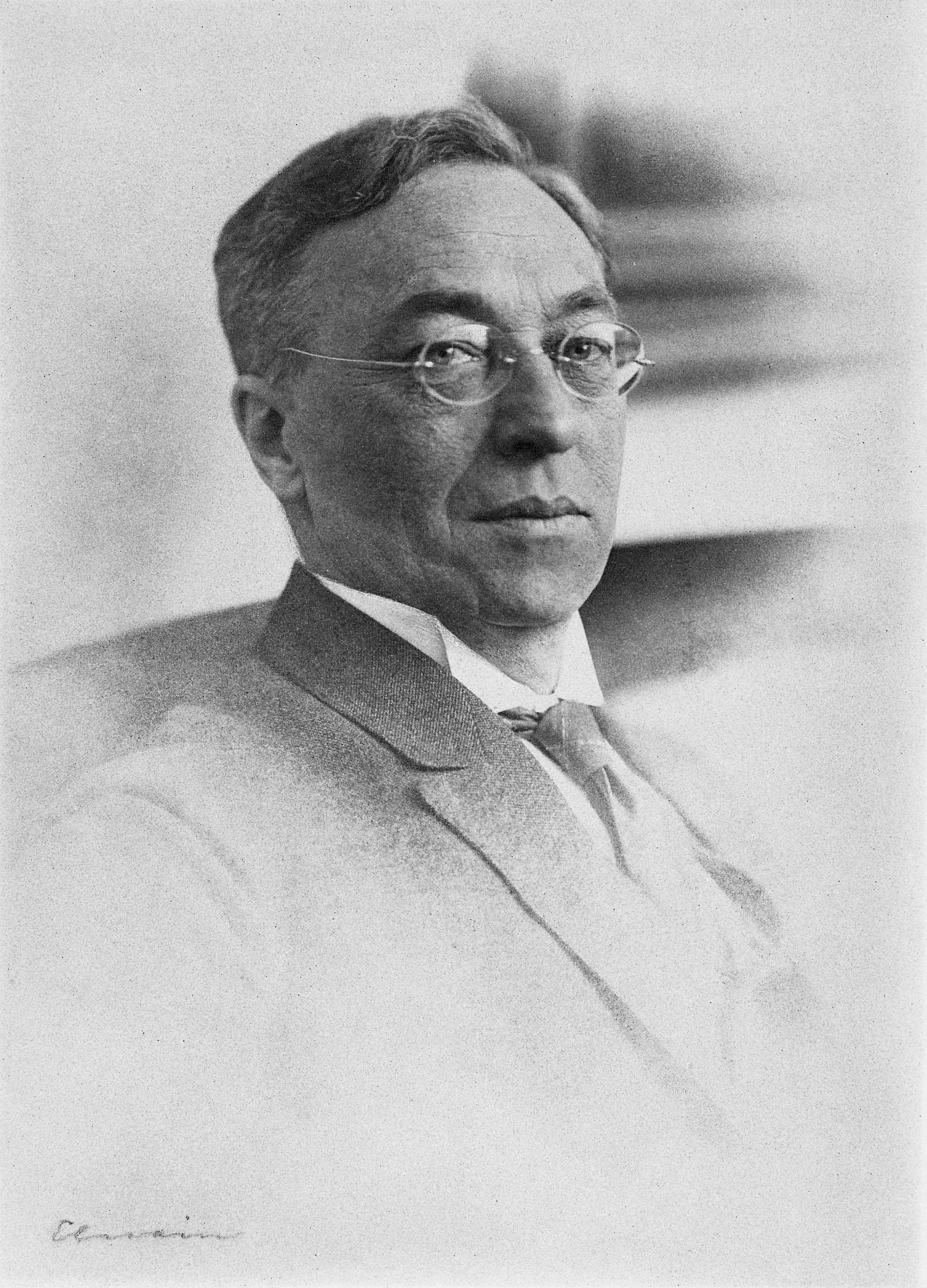
- Kandinsky, c. 1925
- Born: 16 December 1866; Moscow, Russia
- Died: 13 December 1944 (aged 77); Neuilly-sur-Seine, France
- Citizenship: Russia; France (from 1939)
- Education: Academy of Fine Arts, Munich
- Known for: Painting
- Notable work: On White II, The Blue Rider
- Movement: Expressionism; abstract art
- Spouses: Anja Chimiakina (m. 1892; div. 1911); Nina Nikolaevna Andreevskaya (m. 1917)
- Partner: Gabriele Münter (1902–1916)

Signature
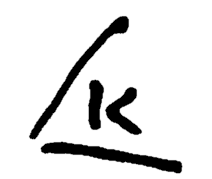

Wassily Wassilyevich Kandinsky (Note: In this name that follows East Slavic naming customs, the patronymic is Wassilyevich and the family name is Kandinsky.) (Note: English: /ˈvæsɪli kænˈdɪnski/ VASS-il-ee kan-DIN-skee; Russian: Василий Васильевич Кандинский, romanized: Vasiliy Vasil'yevich Kandinskiy, IPA: [vɐˈsʲilʲɪj vɐˈsʲilʲjɪvʲɪtɕ kɐnʲˈdʲinskʲɪj]) (16 December [O.S. 4 December] 1866 – 13 December 1944) was a Russian painter and art theorist active in Germany during the late Belle Époque and Interwar eras. Kandinsky is generally credited as one of the pioneers of abstraction in Western art. Born in Moscow, he began painting studies (life-drawing, sketching, and anatomy) at the age of 30.

In 1896, Kandinsky settled in Munich, studying first at Anton Ažbe's private school and then at the Academy of Fine Arts. During this time, he was first the teacher and then the partner of German artist Gabriele Münter. He returned to Moscow in 1914 after the outbreak of World War I. Following the Russian Revolution, Kandinsky "became an insider in the cultural administration of Anatoly Lunacharsky" and helped establish the Museum of the Culture of Painting. However, by then, "his spiritual outlook... was foreign to the argumentative materialism of Soviet society" and opportunities beckoned in Germany, to which he returned in 1920. There, he taught at the Bauhaus school of art and architecture from 1922 until the Nazis closed it in 1933. He then moved to France, where he lived for the rest of his life, becoming a French citizen in 1939 and producing some of his most prominent art. He died in Neuilly-sur-Seine in 1944.

== Early life ==
Kandinsky was born in Moscow, the son of Lidia Tikheeva and Vassily Silvestrovich Kandinsky, a tea merchant. One of his great-grandmothers was Princess Gantimurova. Kandinsky learned from a variety of sources while in Moscow. He studied many fields while in school, including law and economics. Later in life, he would recall being fascinated and stimulated by colour as a child. His fascination with colour symbolism and psychology continued as he grew.

In 1889, at age 23, he was part of an ethnographic research group that travelled to the Vologda region north of Moscow. In Looks on the Past, he relates that the houses and churches were decorated with such shimmering colours that upon entering them, he felt that he was moving into a painting. This experience, as well as his study of the region's folk art (particularly the use of bright colours on a dark background), were reflected in much of his early work.

A few years later, he first likened painting to composing music in the manner for which he would become noted, writing "Colour is the keyboard, the eyes are the harmony, the soul is the piano with many strings. The artist is the hand which plays, touching one key or another, to cause vibrations in the soul".

Kandinsky was also the uncle of Russian-French philosopher Alexandre Kojève (1902–1968).

== Artistic periods ==
Kandinsky's creation of abstract work followed a long period of development and maturation of intense thought based on his artistic experiences. He called this devotion to inner beauty, fervor of spirit and spiritual desire "inner necessity"; it was a central aspect of his art. Some art historians suggest that Kandinsky's passion for abstract art began when one day, coming back home, he found one of his own paintings hanging upside down in his studio and he stared at it for a while before realizing it was his own work, suggesting to him the potential power of abstraction.

In 1896, at the age of 30, Kandinsky gave up a promising career teaching law and economics to enroll in the Munich Academy where his teachers would eventually include Franz von Stuck. He was not immediately granted admission and began learning art on his own. That same year, before leaving Moscow, he saw an exhibit of paintings by Monet. He was particularly taken with the impressionistic style of Haystacks; this, to him, had a powerful sense of colour almost independent of the objects themselves. Later, he would write about this experience:

That it was a haystack the catalogue informed me. I could not recognise it. This non-recognition was painful to me. I considered that the painter had no right to paint indistinctly. I dully felt that the object of the painting was missing. And I noticed with surprise and confusion that the picture not only gripped me, but impressed itself ineradicably on my memory. Painting took on a fairy-tale power and splendour.

— Wassily Kandinsky

Kandinsky was similarly influenced during this period by Richard Wagner's Lohengrin which, he felt, pushed the limits of music and melody beyond standard lyricism. He was also spiritually influenced by Madame Blavatsky (1831–1891), the best-known exponent of theosophy. Theosophical theory postulates that creation is a geometrical progression, beginning with a single point. The creative aspect of the form is expressed by a descending series of circles, triangles, and squares. Kandinsky's book Concerning the Spiritual in Art (1910) and Point and Line to Plane (1926) echoed this theosophical tenet. Illustrations by John Varley in Thought-Forms (1901) influenced him visually.

=== Metamorphosis ===
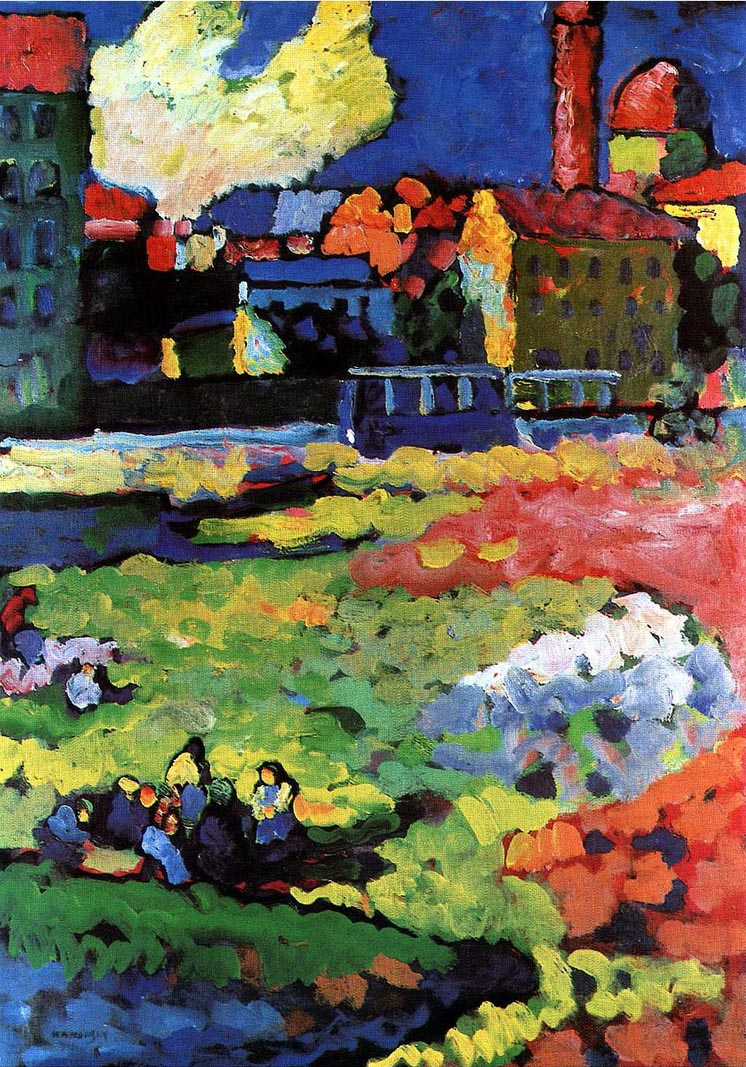
Munich-Schwabing with the Church of St. Ursula (1908)

In the summer of 1902, Kandinsky invited Gabriele Münter to join him at his summer painting classes just south of Munich in the Alps. She accepted the offer and their relationship became more personal than professional. It was during this time that he began to emerge as an art theorist as well as a painter. The number of his existing paintings increased at the beginning of the 20th century; much remains of the landscapes and towns he painted, using broad swaths of colour and recognisable forms. For the most part, however, Kandinsky's paintings did not feature any human figures; an exception is Sunday, Old Russia (1904), in which Kandinsky recreates a highly colourful (and fanciful) view of peasants and nobles in front of the walls of a town. Couple on Horseback (1907) depicts a man on horseback, holding a woman as they ride past a Russian town with luminous walls across a blue river. The horse is muted while the leaves in the trees, the town, and the reflections in the river glisten with spots of colour and brightness. This work demonstrates the influence of pointillism in the way the depth of field is collapsed into a flat, luminescent surface. Fauvism is also apparent in these early works. Colours are used to express Kandinsky's experience of subject matter, not to describe objective nature.

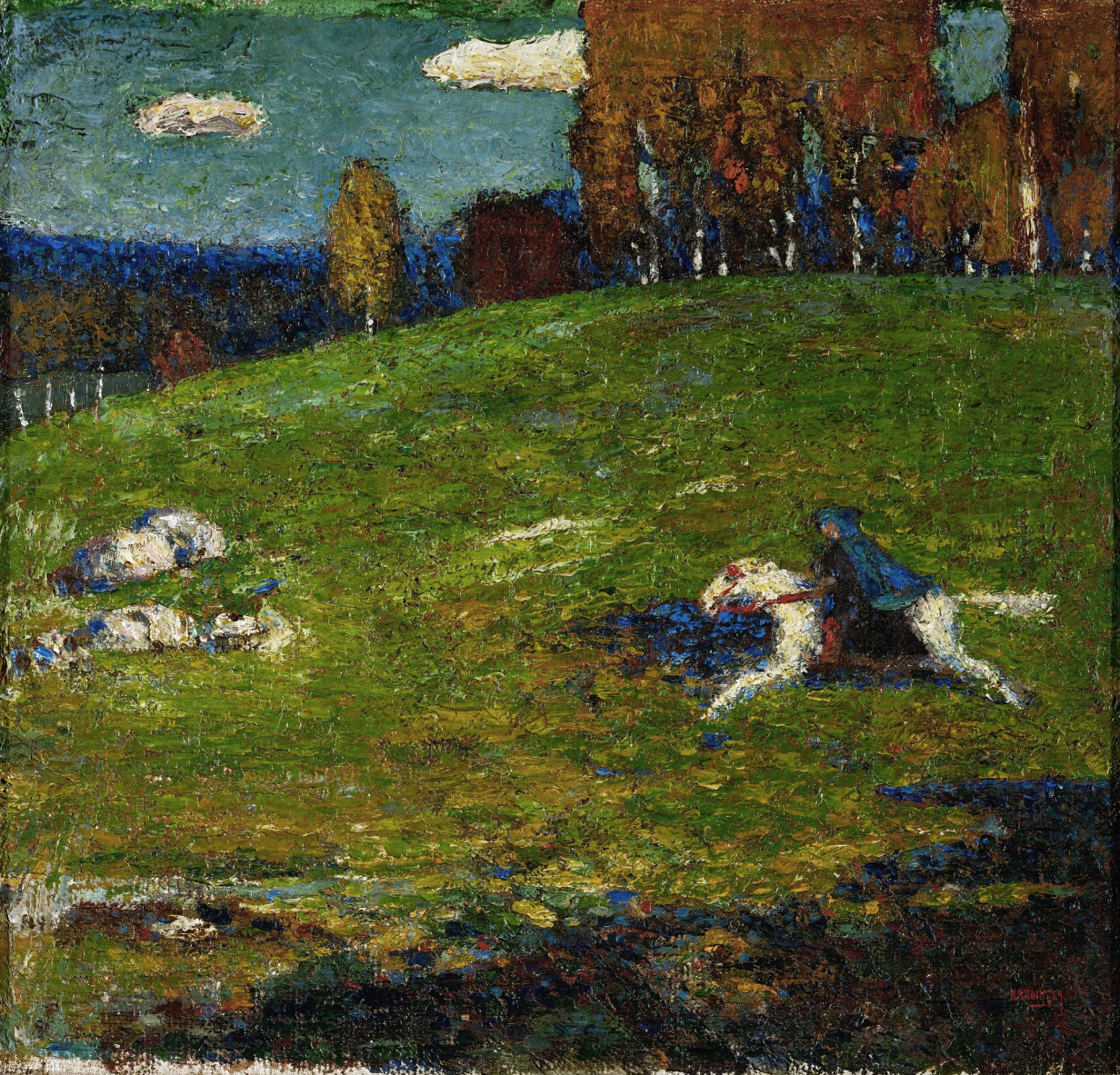
The Blue Rider (1903)

Perhaps the most important of his paintings from the first decade of the 1900s was The Blue Rider (1903), which shows a small cloaked figure on a speeding horse rushing through a rocky meadow. The rider's cloak is medium blue, which casts a darker-blue shadow. In the foreground are more amorphous blue shadows, the counterparts of the fall trees in the background. The blue rider in the painting is prominent (but not clearly defined), and the horse has an unnatural gait. This intentional disjunction, allowing viewers to participate in the creation of the artwork, became an increasingly conscious technique used by Kandinsky in subsequent years; it culminated in the abstract works of the 1911–1914 period. In The Blue Rider, Kandinsky shows the rider more as a series of colours than in specific detail. This painting is not exceptional in that regard when compared with contemporary painters, but it shows the direction Kandinsky would take only a few years later.

From 1906 to 1908, Kandinsky spent a great deal of time travelling across Europe (he was an associate of the Blue Rose symbolist group of Moscow) until he settled in the small Bavarian town of Murnau. In 1908, he bought a copy of Thought-Forms by Annie Besant and Charles Webster Leadbeater. In 1909, he joined the Theosophical Society. The Blue Mountain (1908–1909) was painted at this time, demonstrating his trend toward abstraction. A mountain of blue is flanked by two broad trees, one yellow and one red. A procession, with three riders and several others, crosses at the bottom. The faces, clothing, and saddles of the riders are each a single colour, and neither they nor the walking figures display any real detail. The flat planes and the contours also are indicative of Fauvist influence. The broad use of colour in The Blue Mountain illustrates Kandinsky's inclination toward an art in which colour is presented independently of form, and in which each colour is given equal attention. The composition is more planar; the painting is divided into four sections: the sky, the red tree, the yellow tree, and the blue mountain with the three riders.

In 1909, Wassily Kandinsky witnessed a presentation Aleksandra Unkovskaya made (at the Theosophical Congress in Budapest) regarding her innovative system in music education, sound-to-colour synesthesia or Chromesthesia which is a type of synesthesia in which sound involuntarily evokes an experience of colour, shape and movement, which led to his own discoveries in his art. Kandinsky stated: "to impress a tune upon unmusical children with the help of colours ... She (Unkovskaya) has constructed a special, precise method of 'translating' the colours of nature into music, of painting the sounds of nature, of seeing sounds." This transcended the spiritual in art and led him to develop the concept and formula of a chain reaction experience (reciprocal relationship/artist and viewer): "Emotion — sensation — the work of art — sensation — emotion." The concept was based on the principle of the resonance of string instruments.

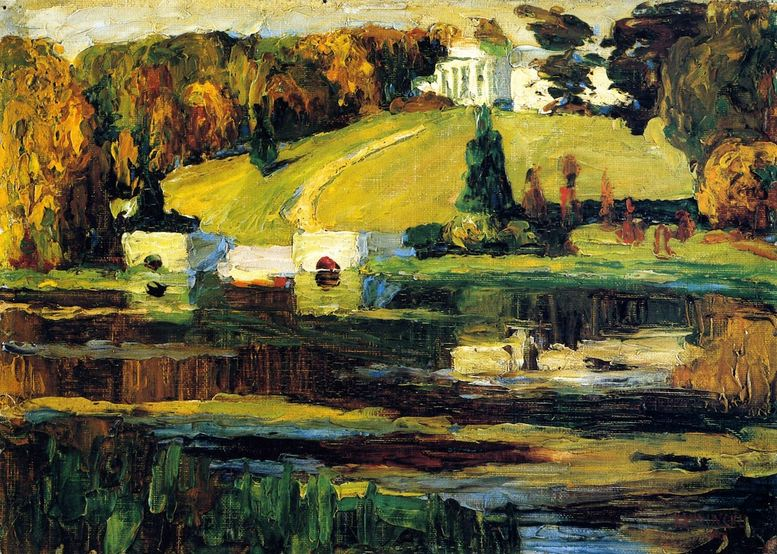
Akhtyrka, 1901, Lenbachhaus, Kunstarealm, Munich

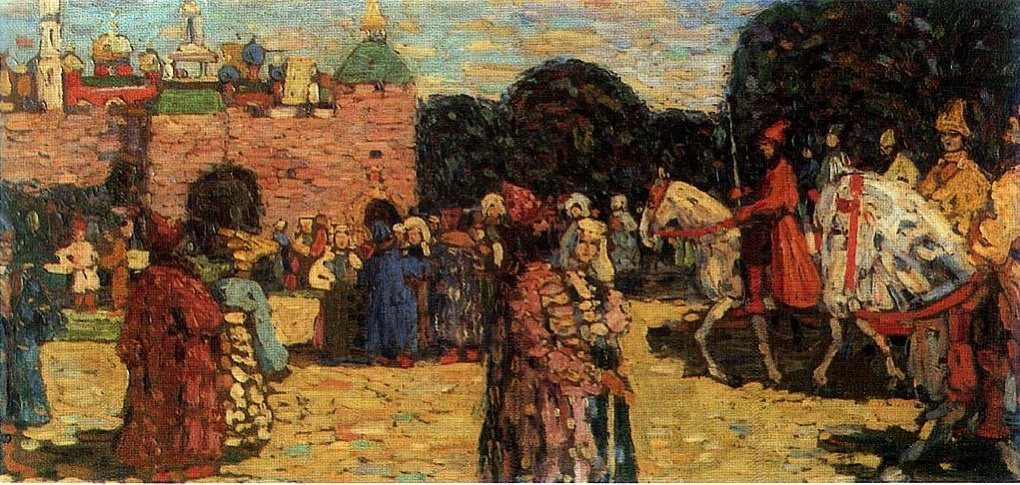
Sunday (Old Russian), 1904, Museum Boijmans Van Beuningen, Rotterdam

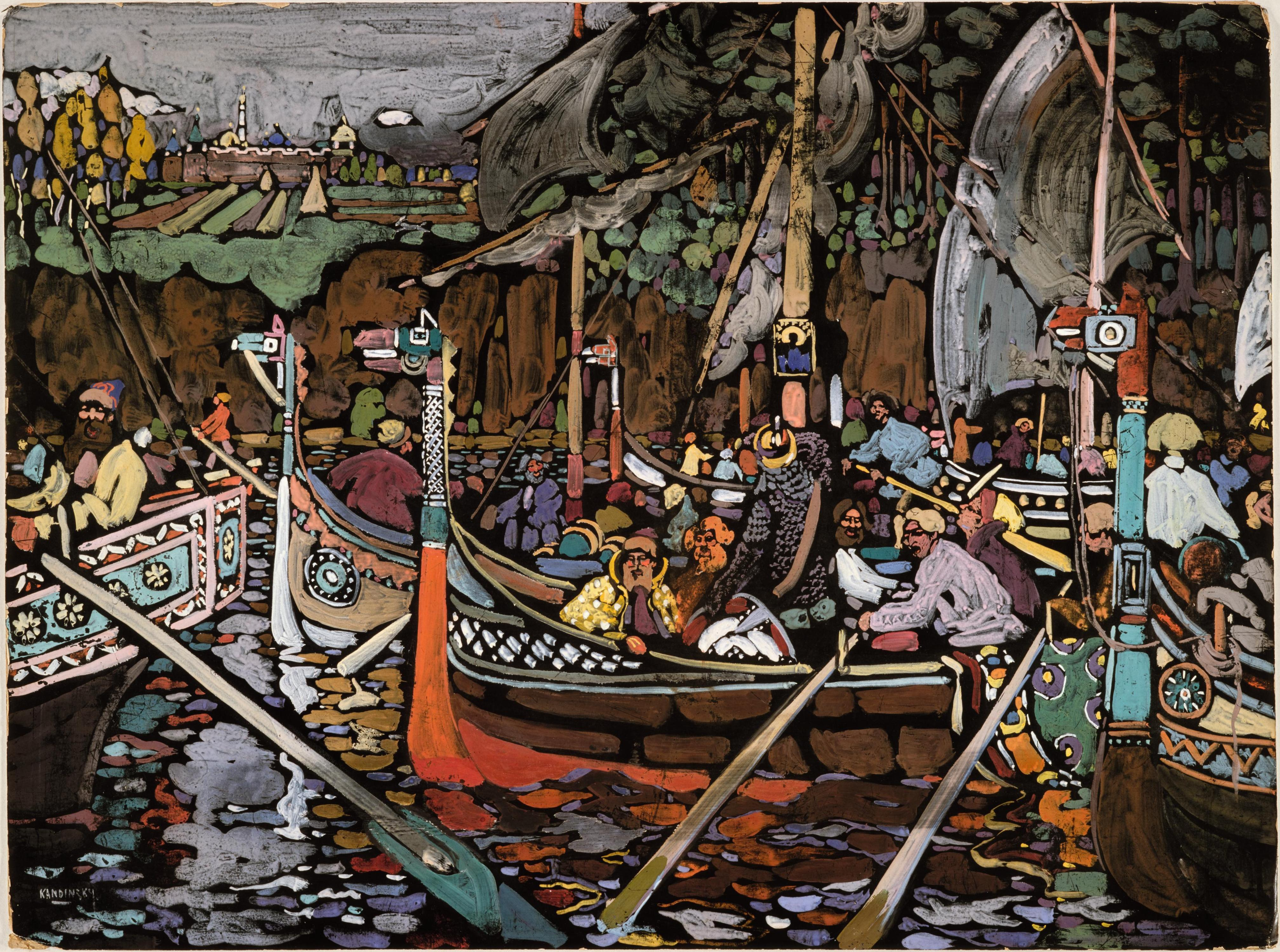
Lied (Chanson), 1906

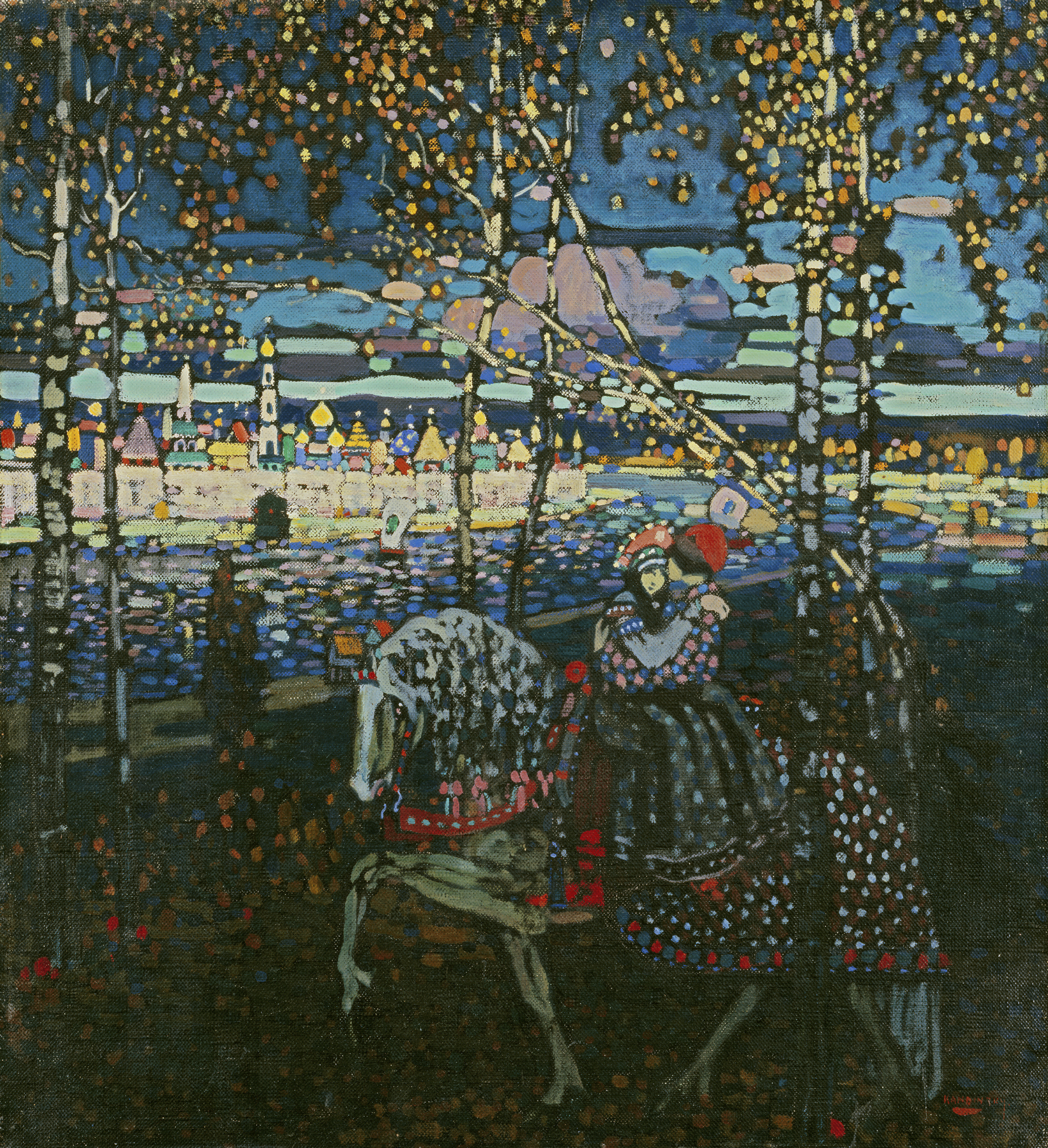
Couple on Horseback, 1906–07, Lenbachhaus, Munich

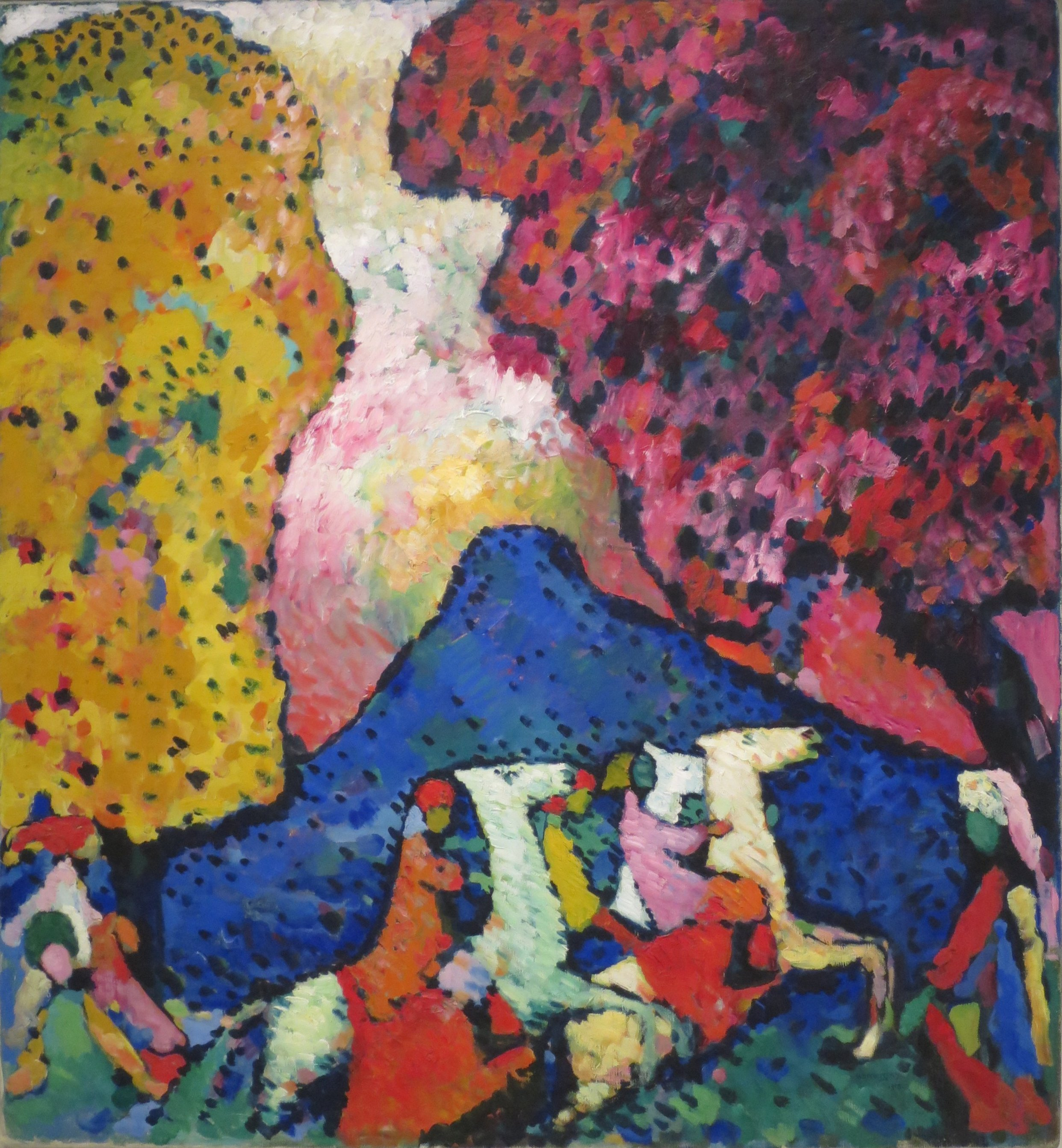
Blue Mountain, 1908–09, Solomon R. Guggenheim Museum, New York

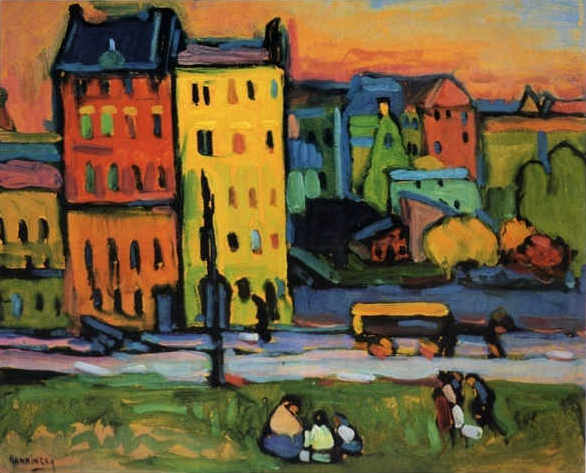
Houses in Munich, 1908, Von der Heydt Museum, Wuppertal

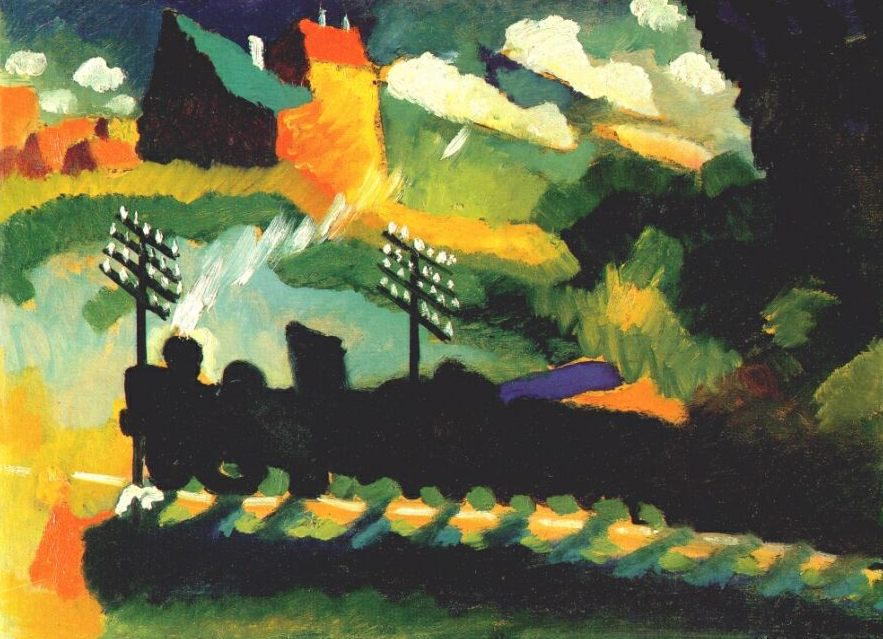
Murnau, train & castle, 1909, Lenbachhaus, Munich

=== Blue Rider Period (1911–1914) ===
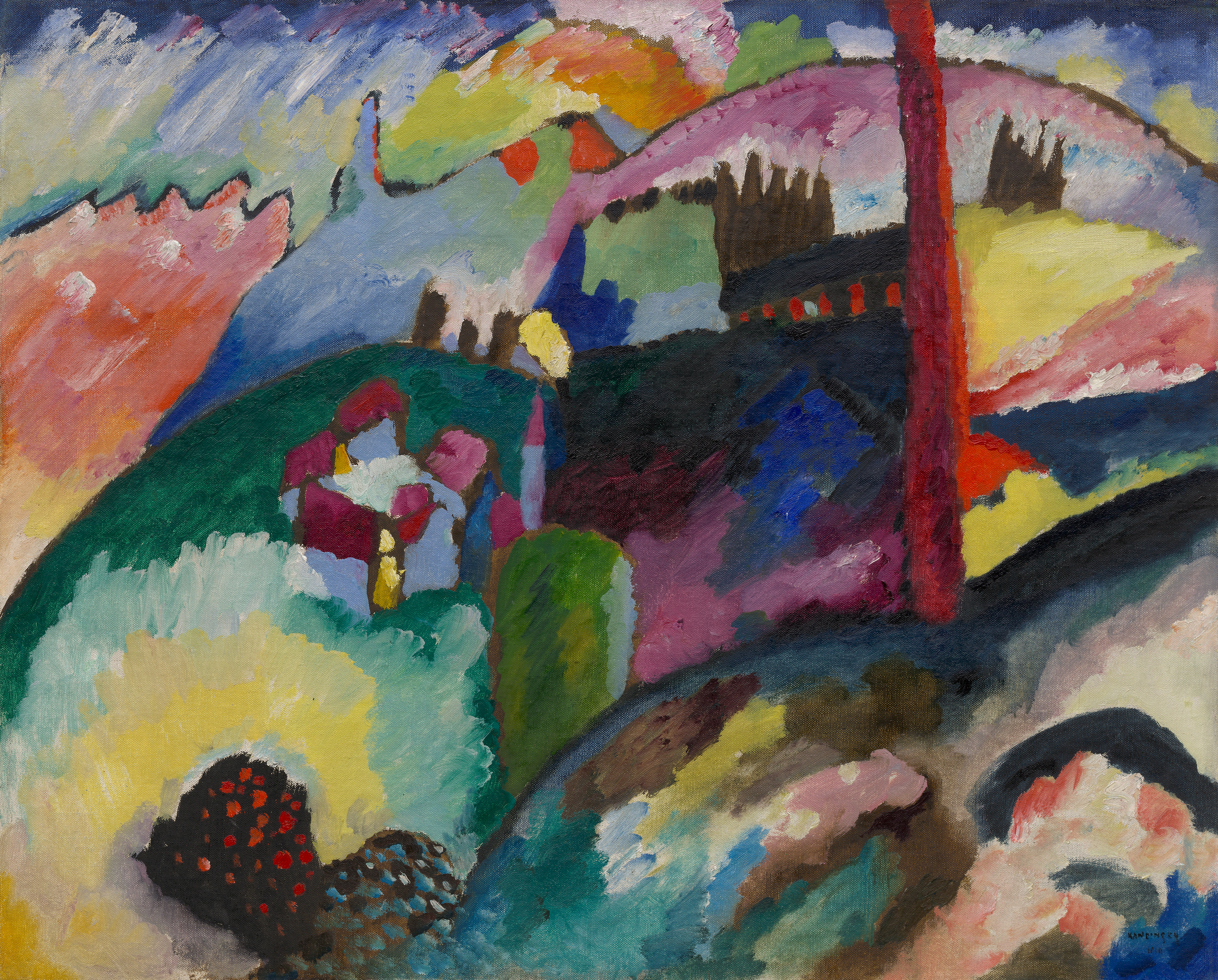
Wassily Kandinsky, 1910, Landscape with Factory Chimney, oil on canvas, 66.2 cm × 82 cm (26.1 in × 32.3 in), Solomon R. Guggenheim Museum

Kandinsky's paintings from this period are large, expressive coloured masses evaluated independently from forms and lines; these serve no longer to delimit them, but overlap freely to form paintings of extraordinary force. Music was important to the birth of abstract art since it is abstract by nature; it does not try to represent the exterior world, but expresses the inner feelings of the soul in an immediate way. Kandinsky sometimes used musical terms to identify his works; he called his most spontaneous paintings "improvisations" and described more elaborate works as "compositions."

In addition to painting, Kandinsky was an art theorist; his influence on the history of Western art stems perhaps more from his theoretical works than from his paintings. He helped found the Neue Künstlervereinigung München (Munich New Artists' Association), becoming its president in 1909. However, the group could not integrate the radical approach of Kandinsky (and others) with conventional artistic concepts and the group dissolved in late 1911. Kandinsky then formed a new group, The Blue Rider (Der Blaue Reiter) with like-minded artists such as August Macke, Franz Marc, Albert Bloch, and Gabriele Münter. The group released an almanac (The Blue Rider Almanac) and held two exhibits. More of each were planned, but the outbreak of World War I in 1914 ended these plans and sent Kandinsky back to Russia via Switzerland and Sweden.

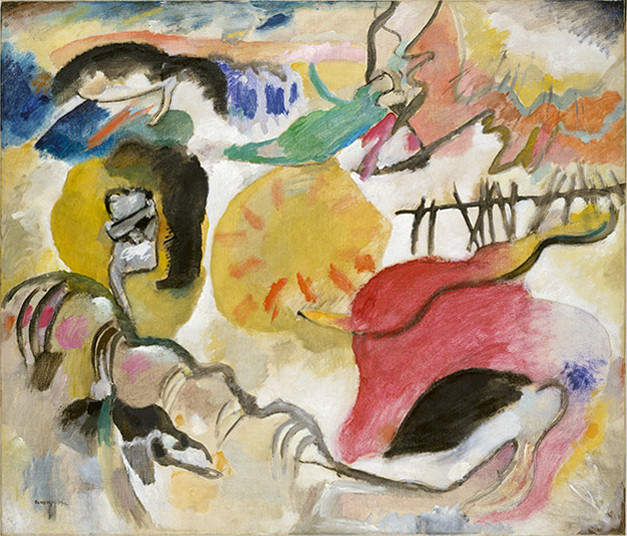
Improvisation 27 (Garden of Love II), 1912, oil on canvas, 120.3 cm × 140.3 cm (47.4 in × 55.2 in), Metropolitan Museum of Art, New York. Exhibited at the 1913 Armory Show

His writing in The Blue Rider Almanac and the treatise "On the Spiritual in Art" (which was released in 1910) were both a defence and promotion of abstract art and an affirmation that all forms of art were equally capable of reaching a level of spirituality. He believed that colour could be used in a painting as something autonomous, apart from the visual description of an object or other form.

These ideas had an almost-immediate international impact, particularly in the English-speaking world. As early as 1912, On the Spiritual in Art was reviewed by Michael Sadleir in the London-based Art News. Interest in Kandinsky grew quickly when Sadleir published an English translation of On the Spiritual in Art in 1914. Extracts from the book were published that year in Percy Wyndham Lewis's periodical Blast, and Alfred Orage's weekly cultural newspaper The New Age. Kandinsky had received some notice earlier in Britain, however; in 1910, he participated in the Allied Artists' Exhibition (organised by Frank Rutter) at London's Royal Albert Hall. This resulted in his work being singled out for praise in a review of that show by the artist Spencer Frederick Gore in The Art News.

Sadleir's interest in Kandinsky also led to Kandinsky's first works entering a British art collection; Sadleir's father, Michael Sadler, acquired several wood-prints and the abstract painting Fragment for Composition VII in 1913 following a visit by father and son to meet Kandinsky in Munich that year. These works were displayed in Leeds, either in the university or the premises of the Leeds Arts Club, between 1913 and 1923.

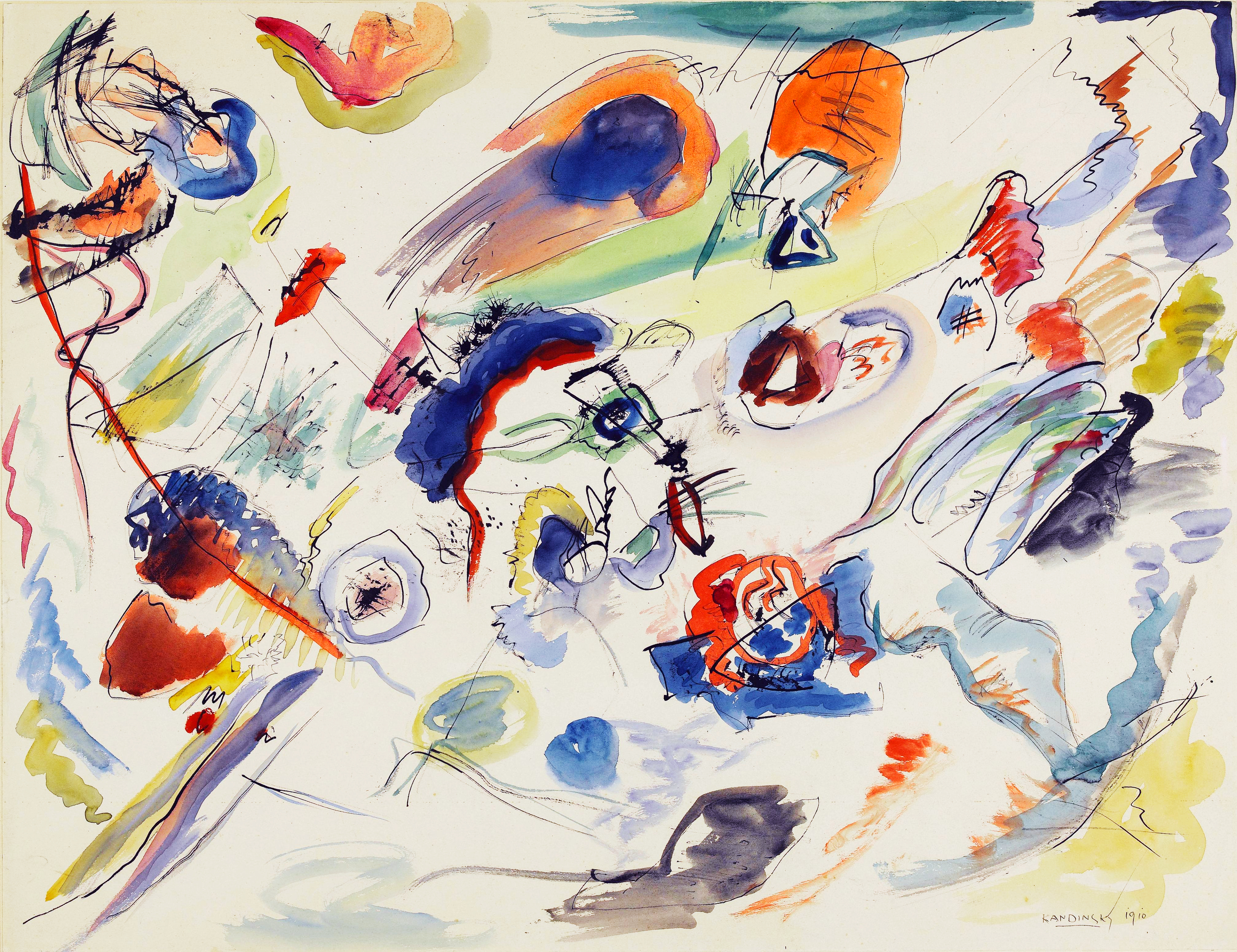
Untitled First Abstract Watercolour, 1910–1913, Centre Pompidou, Paris

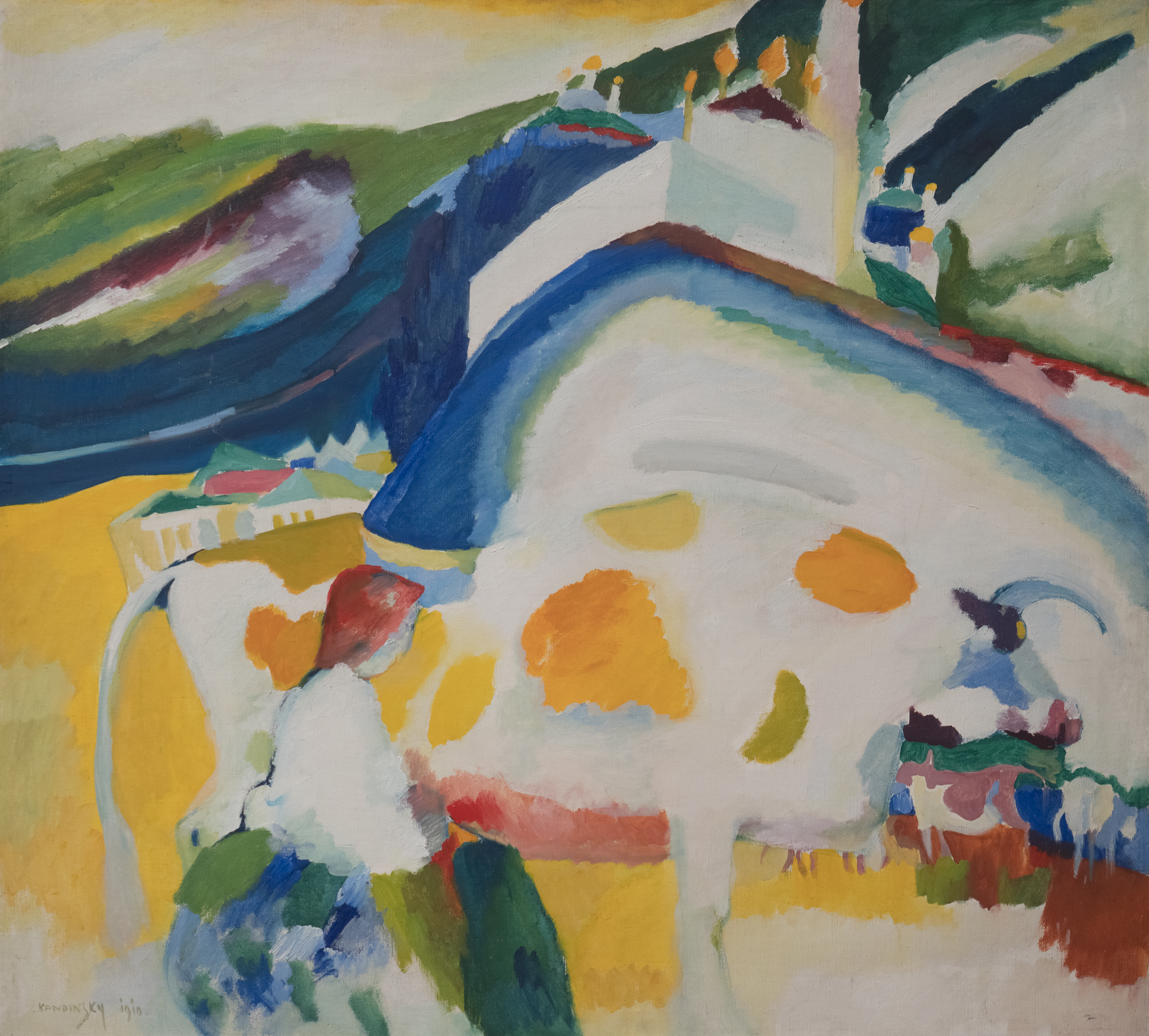
The Cow, 1910, Lenbachhaus, Munich

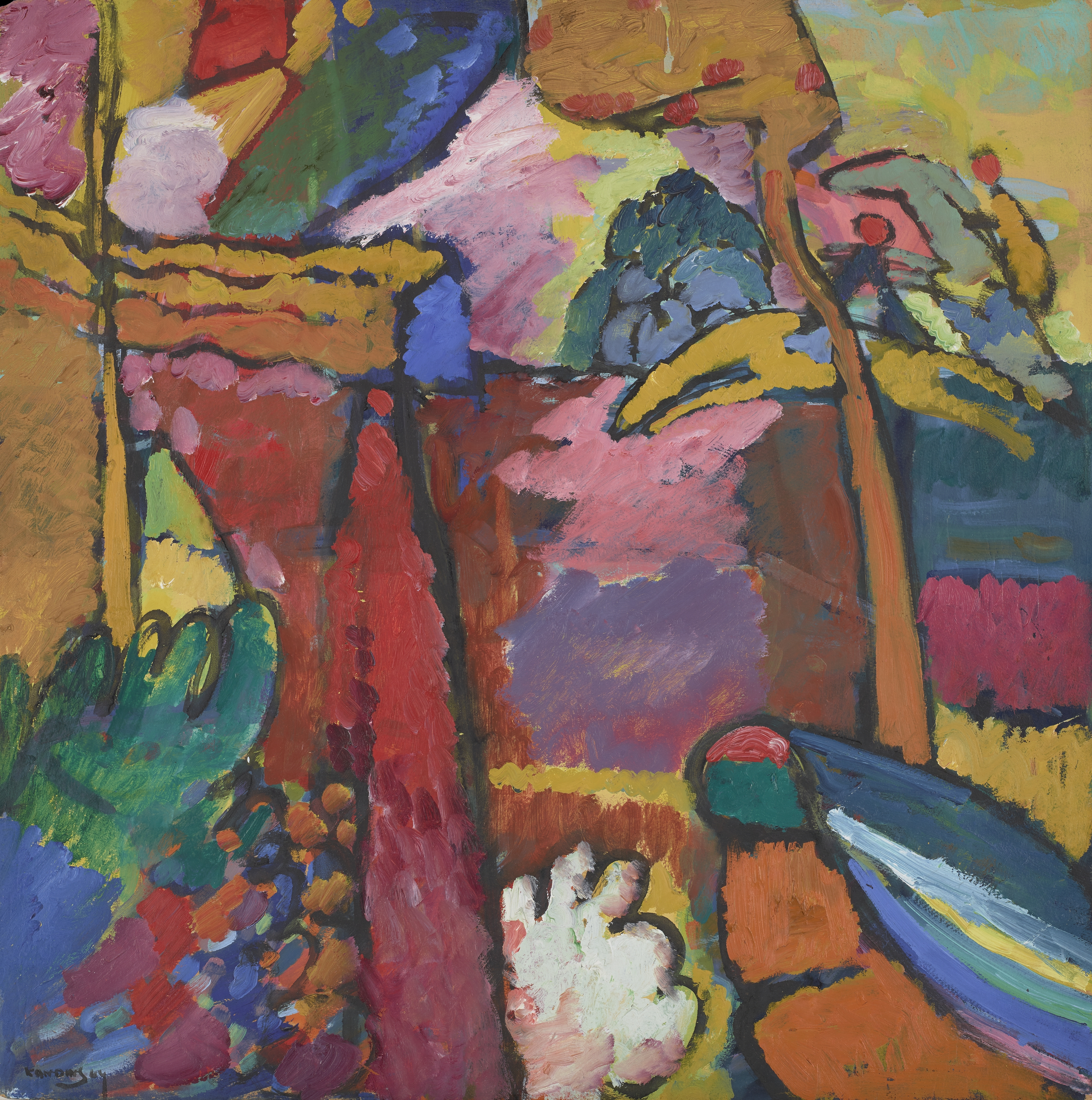
Study for Improvisation V, 1910

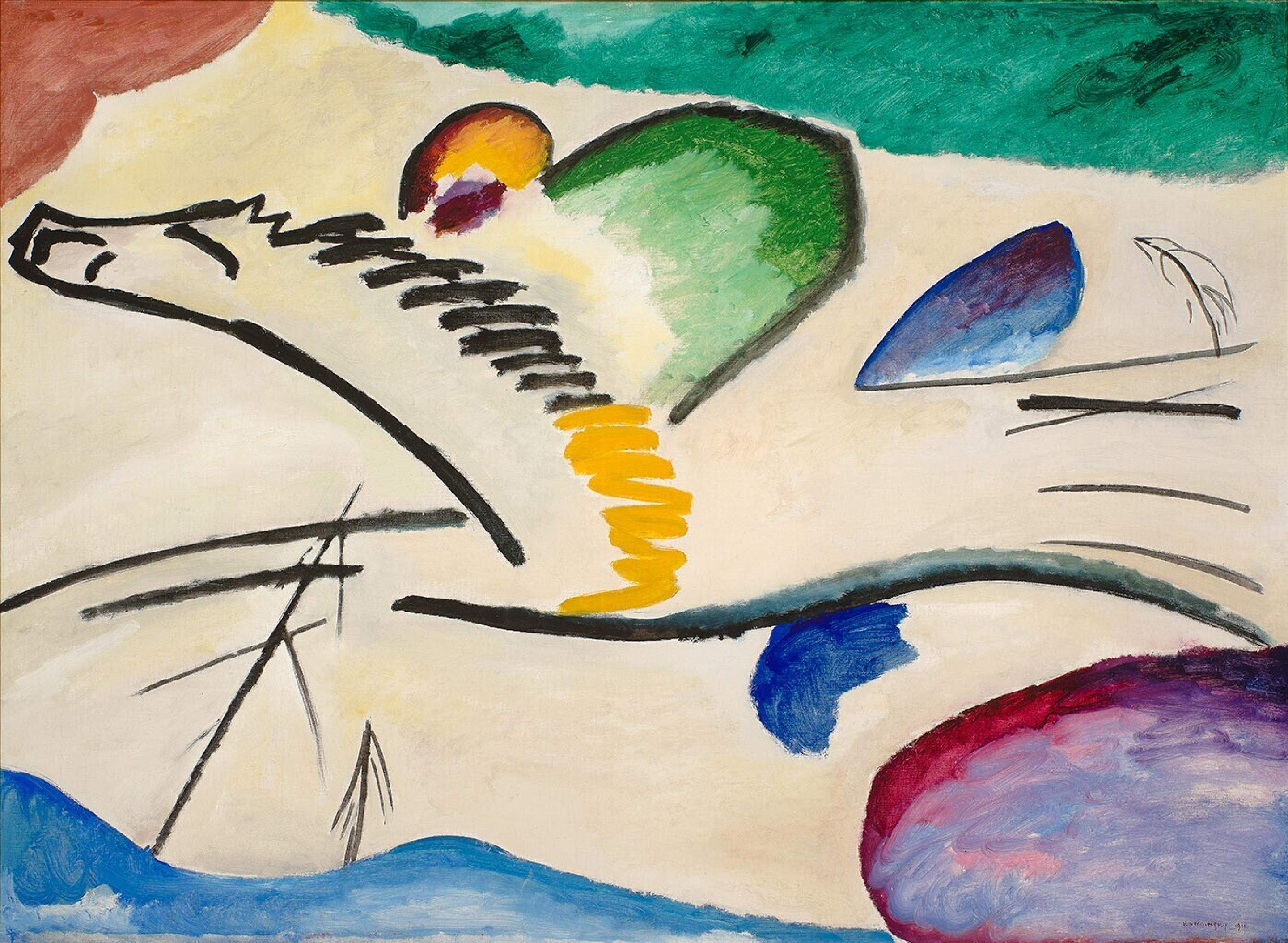
Lyrical, 1911

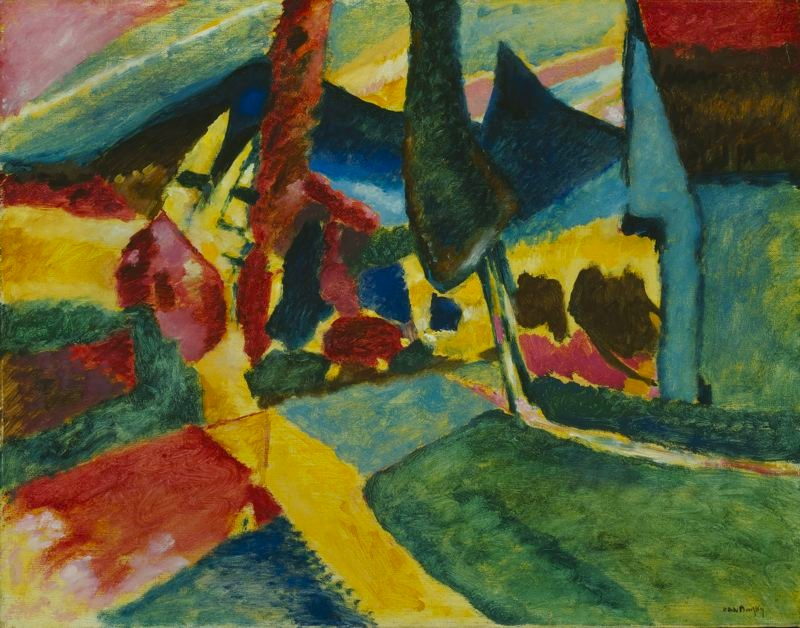
Landscape With Two Poplars, 1912

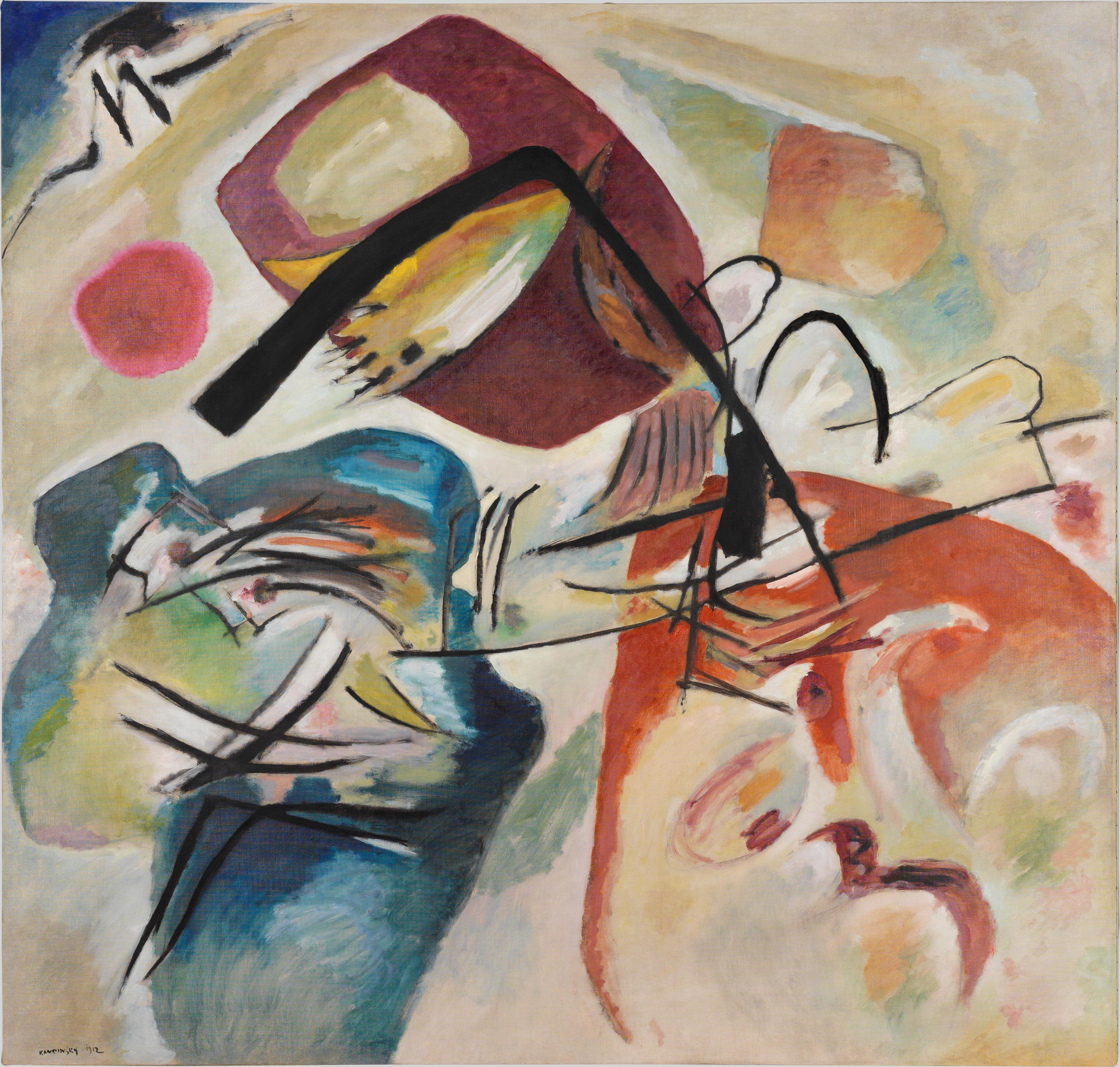
Mit Dem Schwarzen Bogen, 1912, Centre Pompidou, Paris

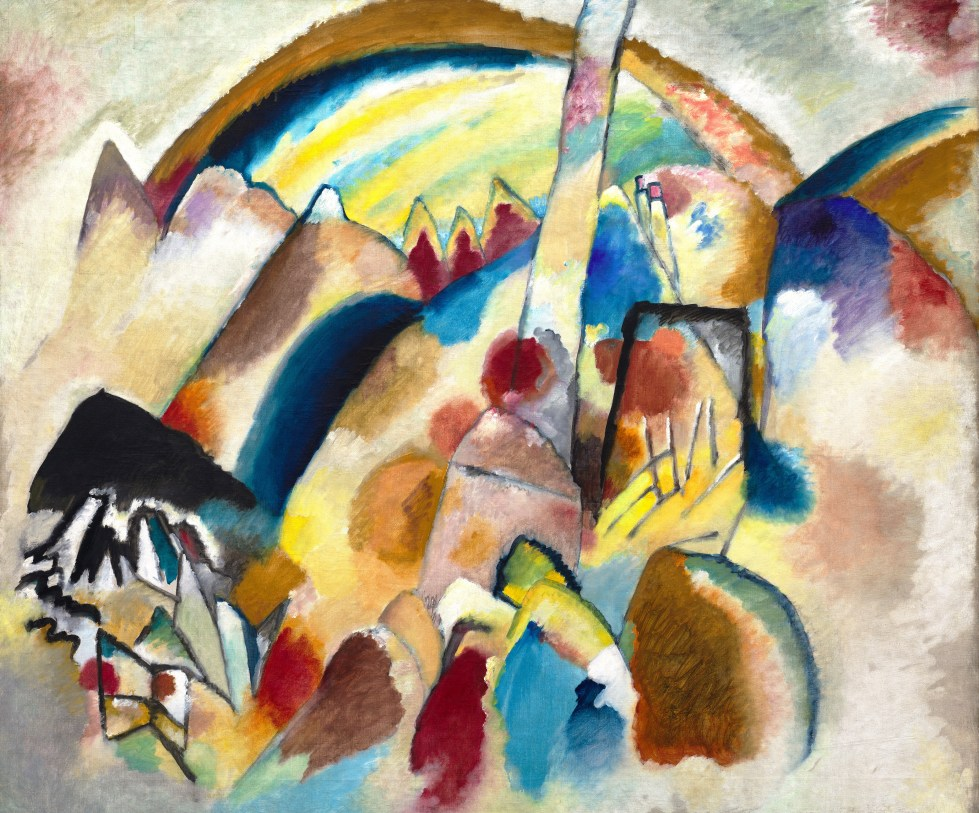
Landscape with Red Spots, No 2, 1913

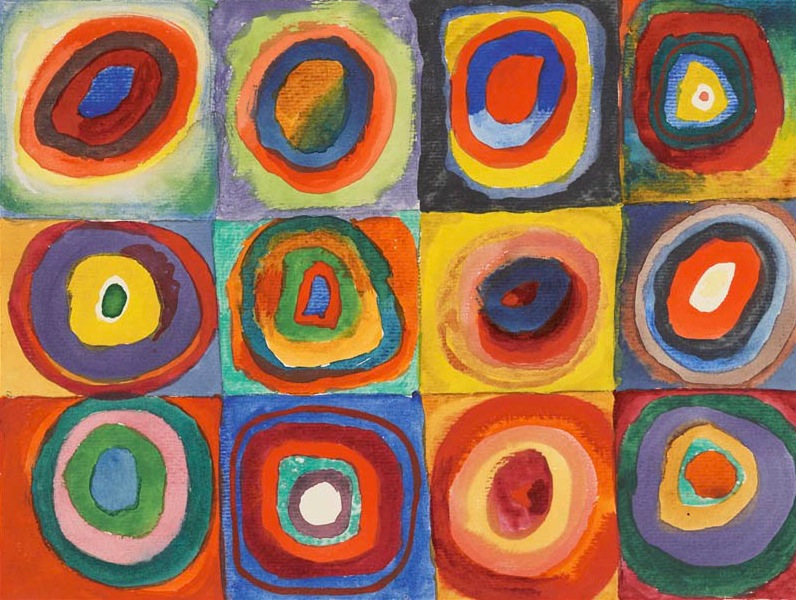
Colour Study: Squares with Concentric Circles, 1913

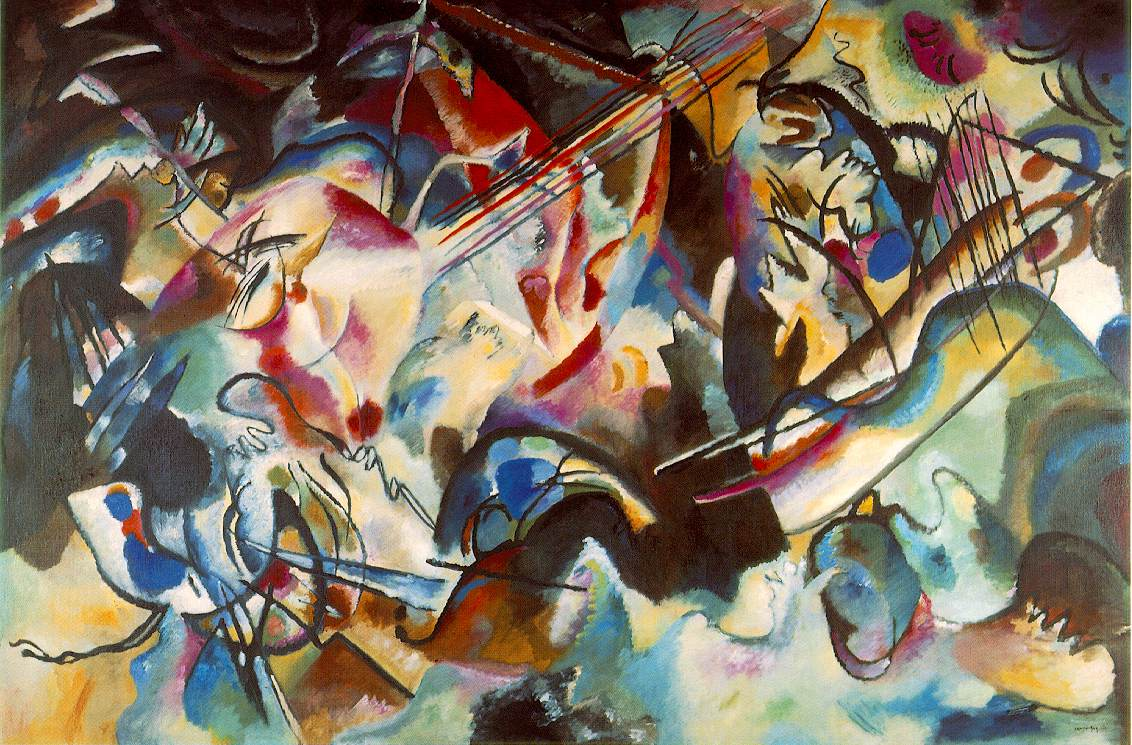
Composition 6, 1913

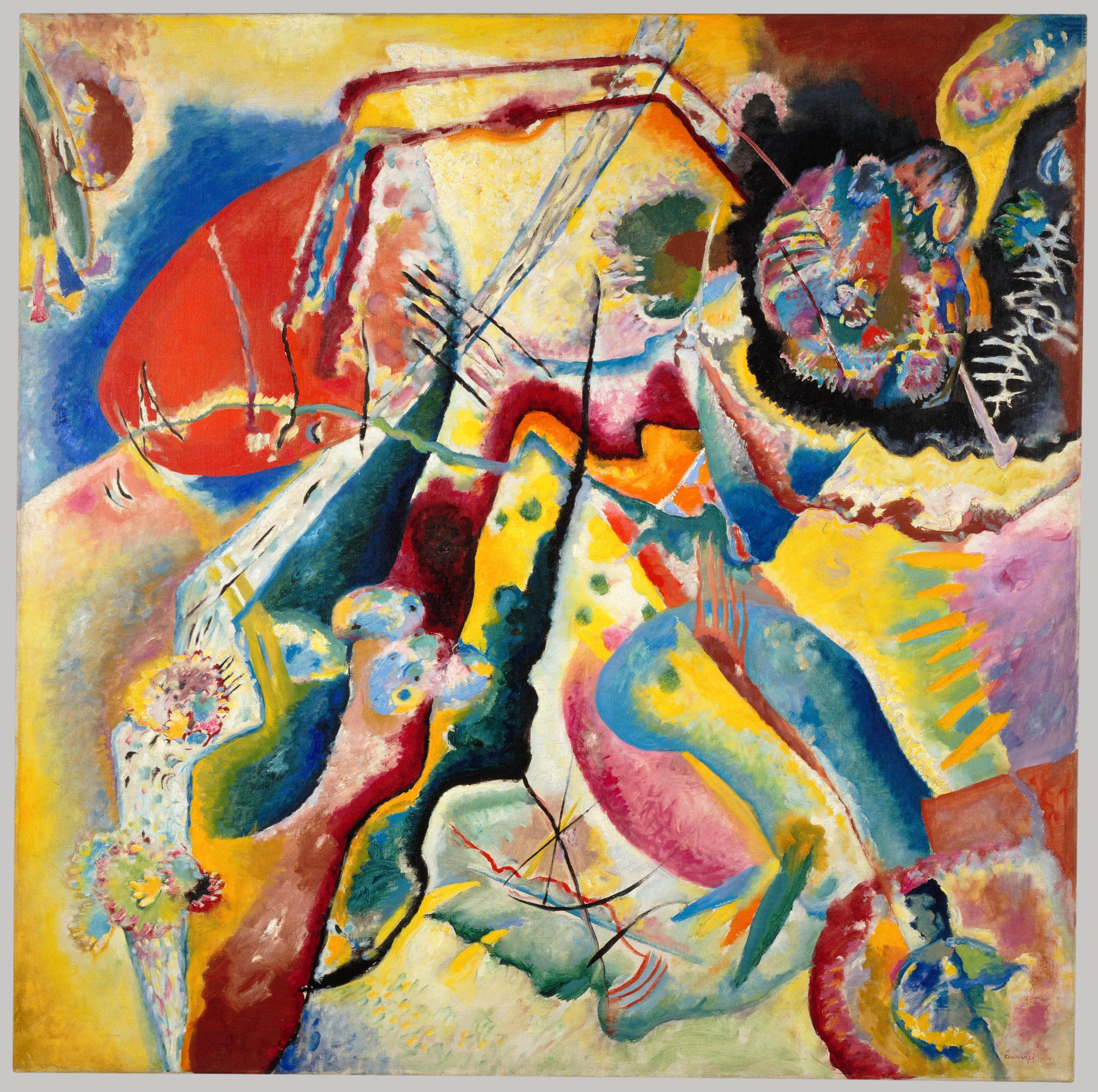
Painting with a Red Stain, 1914

=== Return to Russia (1914–1921) ===
The sun melts all of Moscow down to a single spot that, like a mad tuba, starts all of the heart and all of the soul vibrating. But no, this uniformity of red is not the most beautiful hour. It is only the final chord of a symphony that takes every colour to the zenith of life that, like the fortissimo of a great orchestra, is both compelled and allowed by Moscow to ring out.

— Wassily Kandinsky

From 1918 to 1921, Kandinsky was involved in the cultural politics of Russia and collaborated in art education and museum reform. He painted little during this period, but devoted his time to artistic teaching with a program based on form and colour analysis; he also helped organize the Institute of Artistic Culture in Moscow (of which he was its first director). His spiritual, expressionistic view of art was ultimately rejected by the radical members of the institute as too individualistic and bourgeois. In 1921, Kandinsky was invited to go to Germany to attend the Bauhaus of Weimar by its founder, architect Walter Gropius.

=== Back in Germany and the Bauhaus (1922–1933) ===
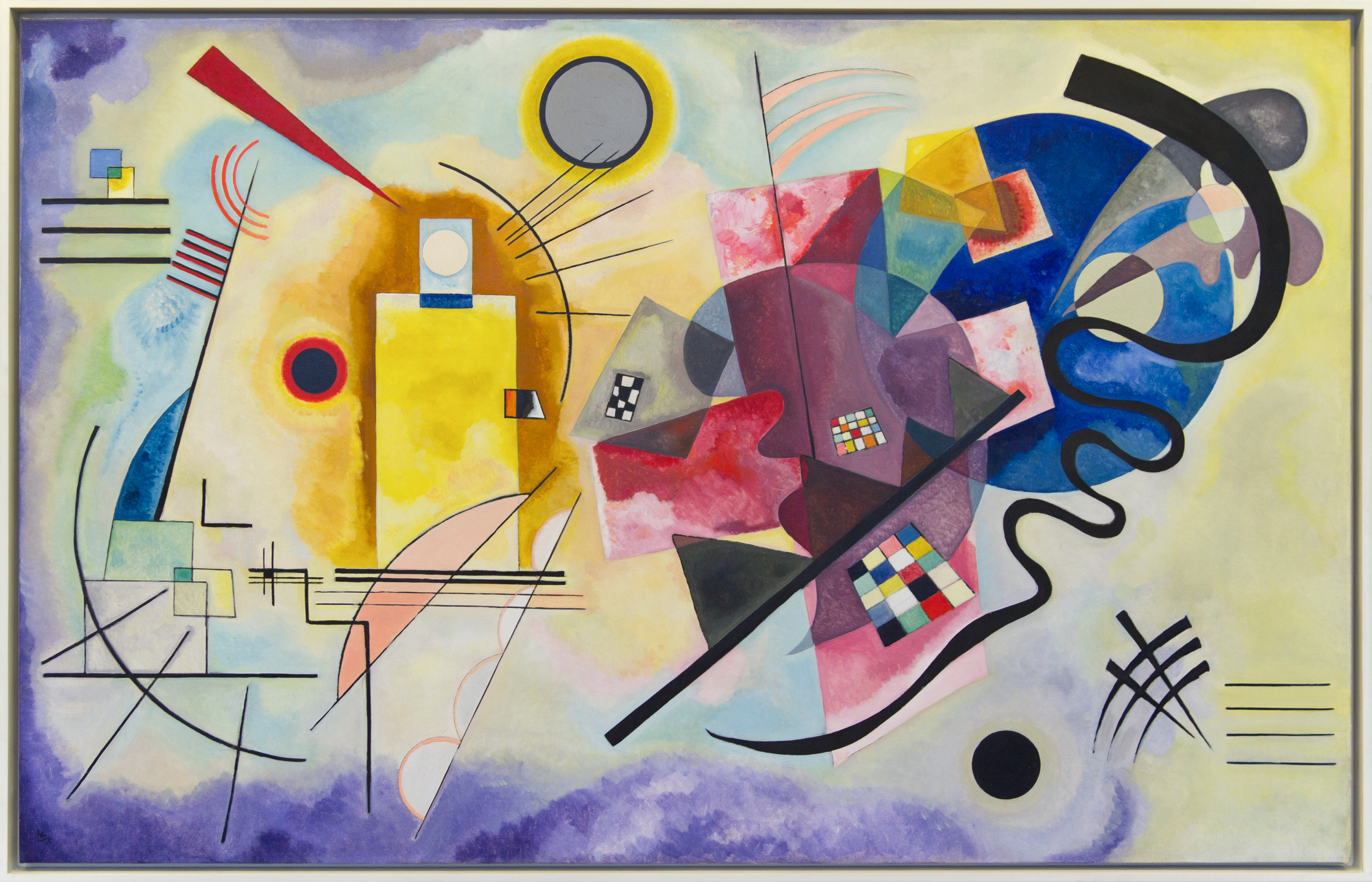
Yellow-Red-Blue, 1925, Musée National d'Art Moderne, Paris

In May 1922, he attended the International Congress of Progressive Artists and signed the "Founding Proclamation of the Union of Progressive International Artists".

Kandinsky taught the basic design class for beginners and the course on advanced theory at the Bauhaus; he also conducted painting classes and a workshop in which he augmented his colour theory with new elements of form psychology. The development of his works on forms study, particularly on points and line forms, led to the publication of his second theoretical book (Point and Line to Plane) in 1926. His examinations of the effects of forces on straight lines, leading to the contrasting tones of curved and angled lines, coincided with the research of Gestalt psychologists, whose work was also discussed at the Bauhaus. Geometrical elements took on increasing importance in both his teaching and painting—particularly the circle, half-circle, the angle, straight lines and curves. This period was intensely productive. This freedom is characterised in his works by the treatment of planes rich in colours and gradations—as in Yellow – red – blue (1925), where Kandinsky illustrates his distance from the constructivism and suprematism movements influential at the time.

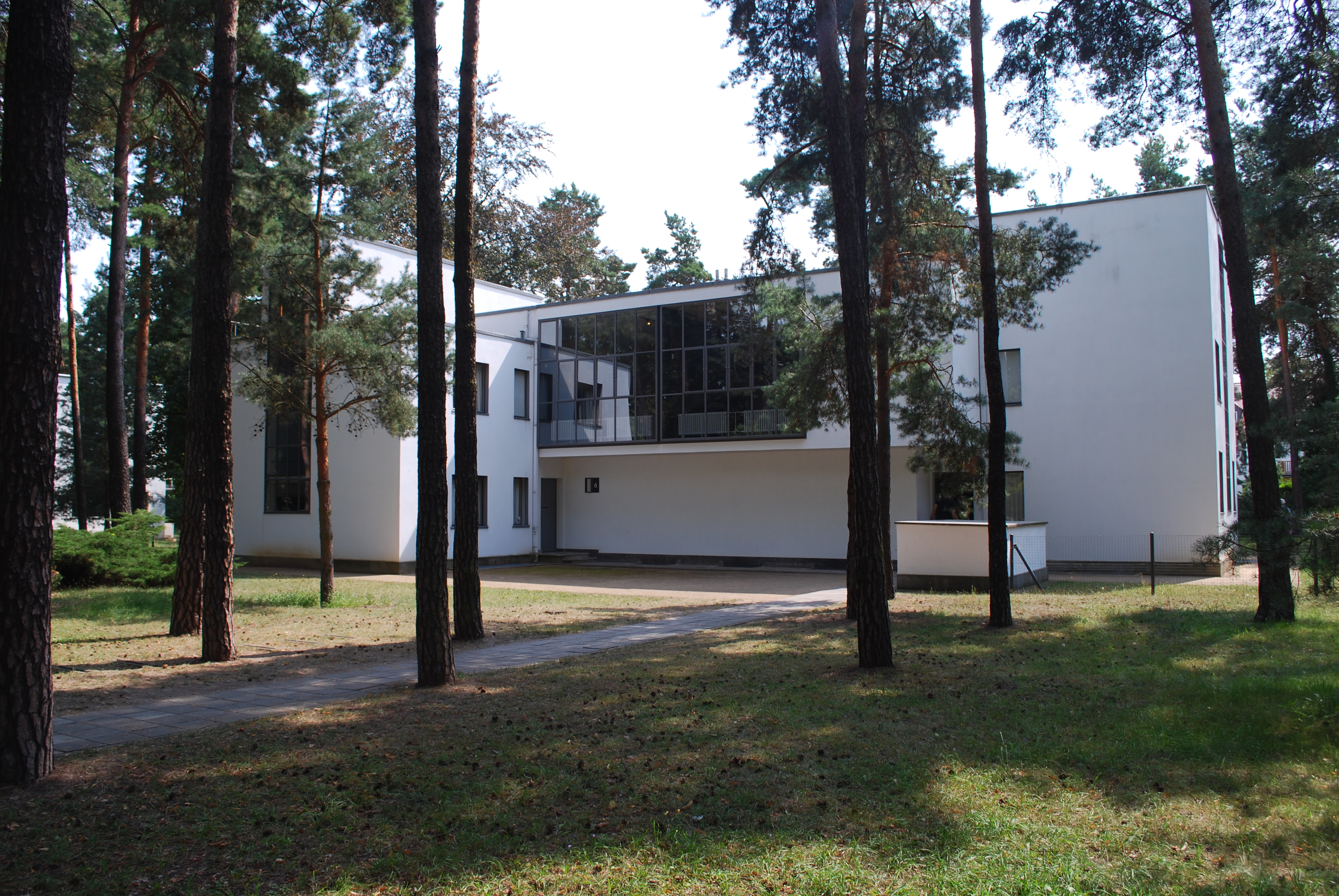
House of Paul Klee and Wassily Kandinsky in Dessau

The two-metre-wide (6 ft 7 in) Yellow – red – blue (1925) of several main forms: a vertical yellow rectangle, an inclined red cross and a large dark blue circle; a multitude of straight (or sinuous) black lines, circular arcs, monochromatic circles and scattered, coloured checker-boards contribute to its delicate complexity. This simple visual identification of forms and the main coloured masses present on the canvas is only a first approach to the inner reality of the work, whose appreciation necessitates deeper observation—not only of forms and colours involved in the painting but their relationship, their absolute and relative positions on the canvas and their harmony.

Kandinsky was one of Die Blaue Vier (The Blue Four), which was a group that was formed in 1923 with Paul Klee, Lyonel Feininger and Alexej von Jawlensky at the instigation of Galka Scheyer, who promoted their work in the United States from 1924 onward. Due to right-wing hostility, the Bauhaus left Weimar for Dessau in 1925. Following a Nazi smear campaign, the Bauhaus left Dessau in 1932 for Berlin, where it remained until its dissolution in July 1933. Kandinsky then left Germany, settling in Paris.

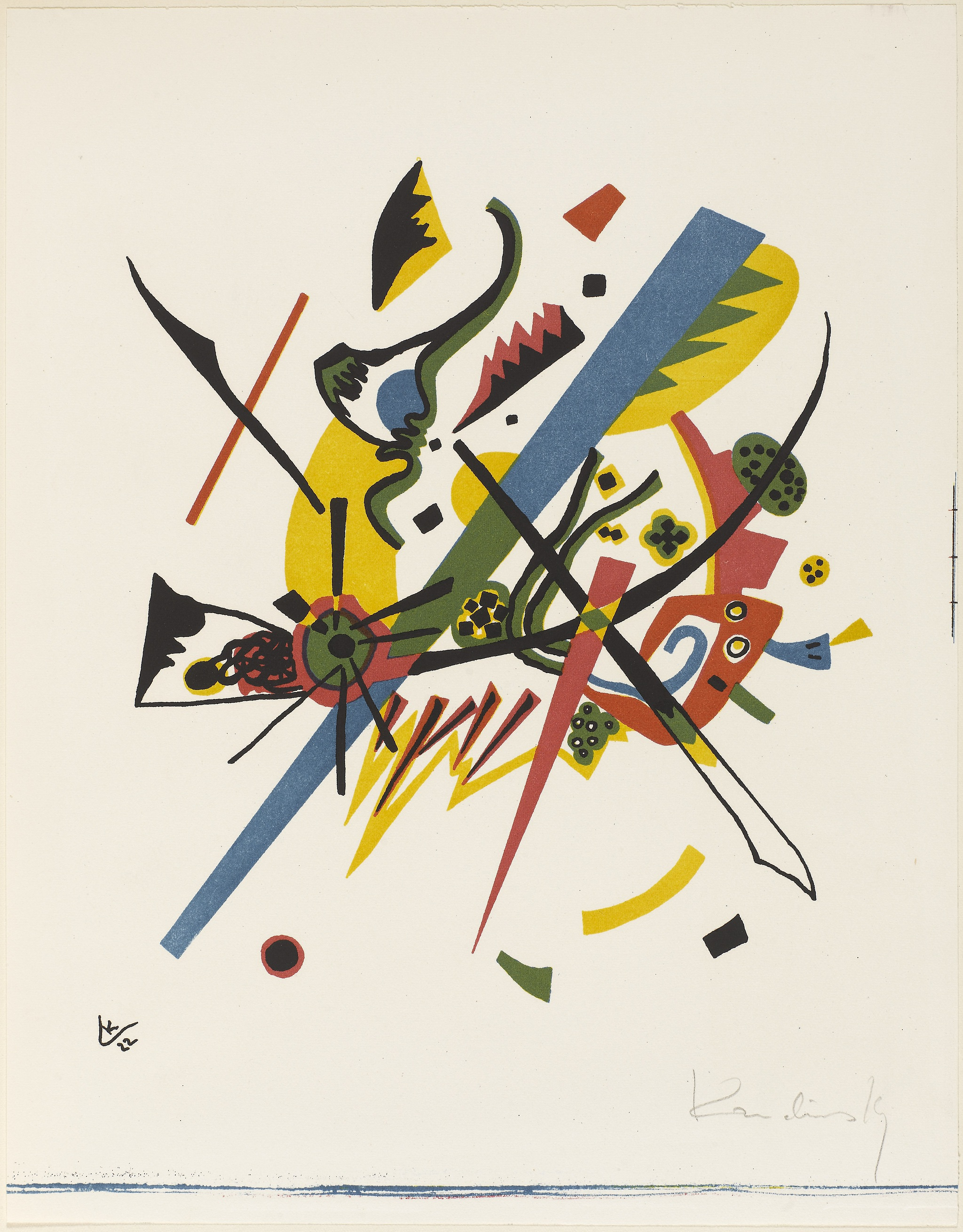
Small worlds I, 1922, National Gallery of Denmark, Copenhagen

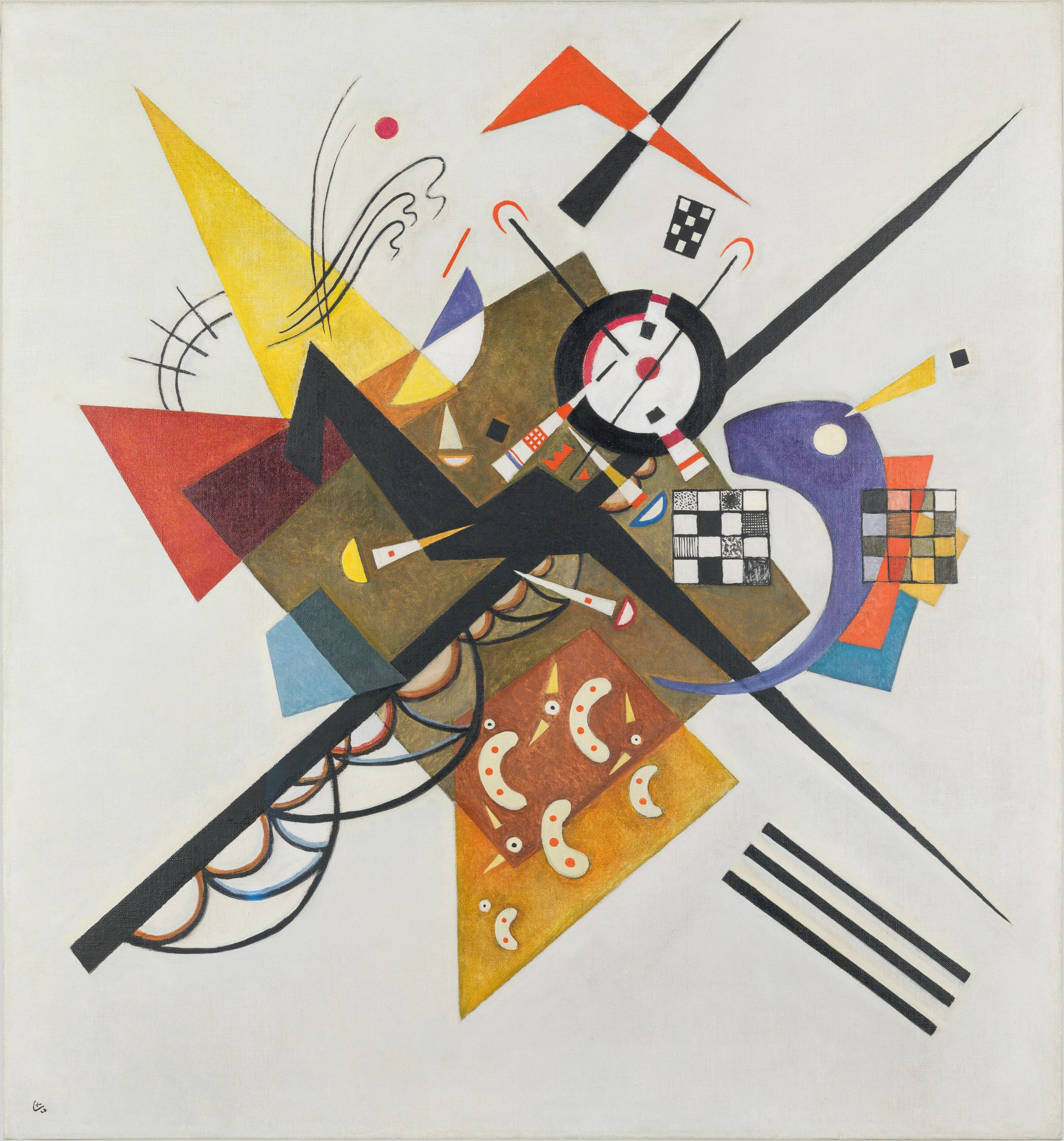
On White II, 1923, Centre Pompidou, Paris

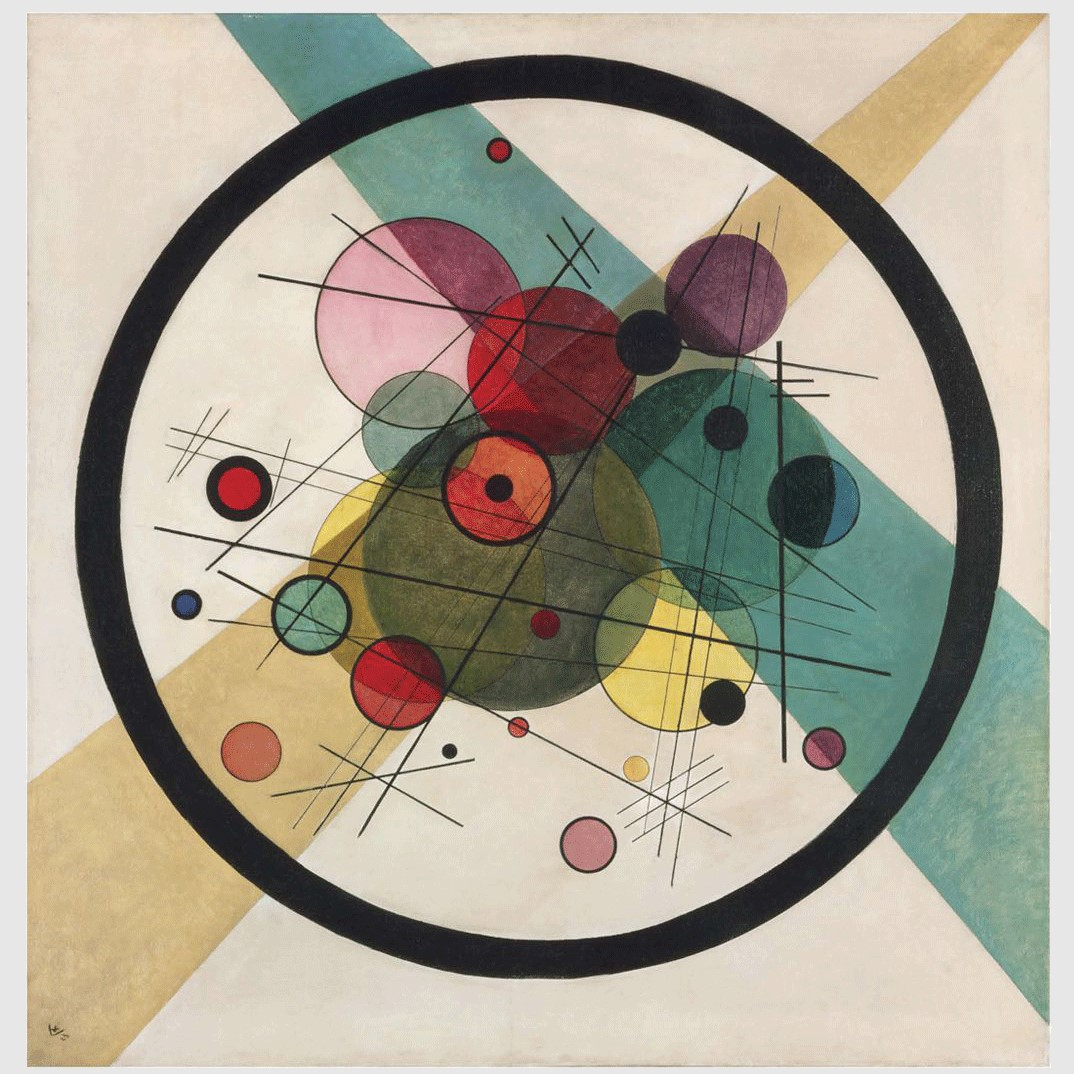
Circles in a Circle, 1923, Philadelphia Museum of Art, Philadelphia

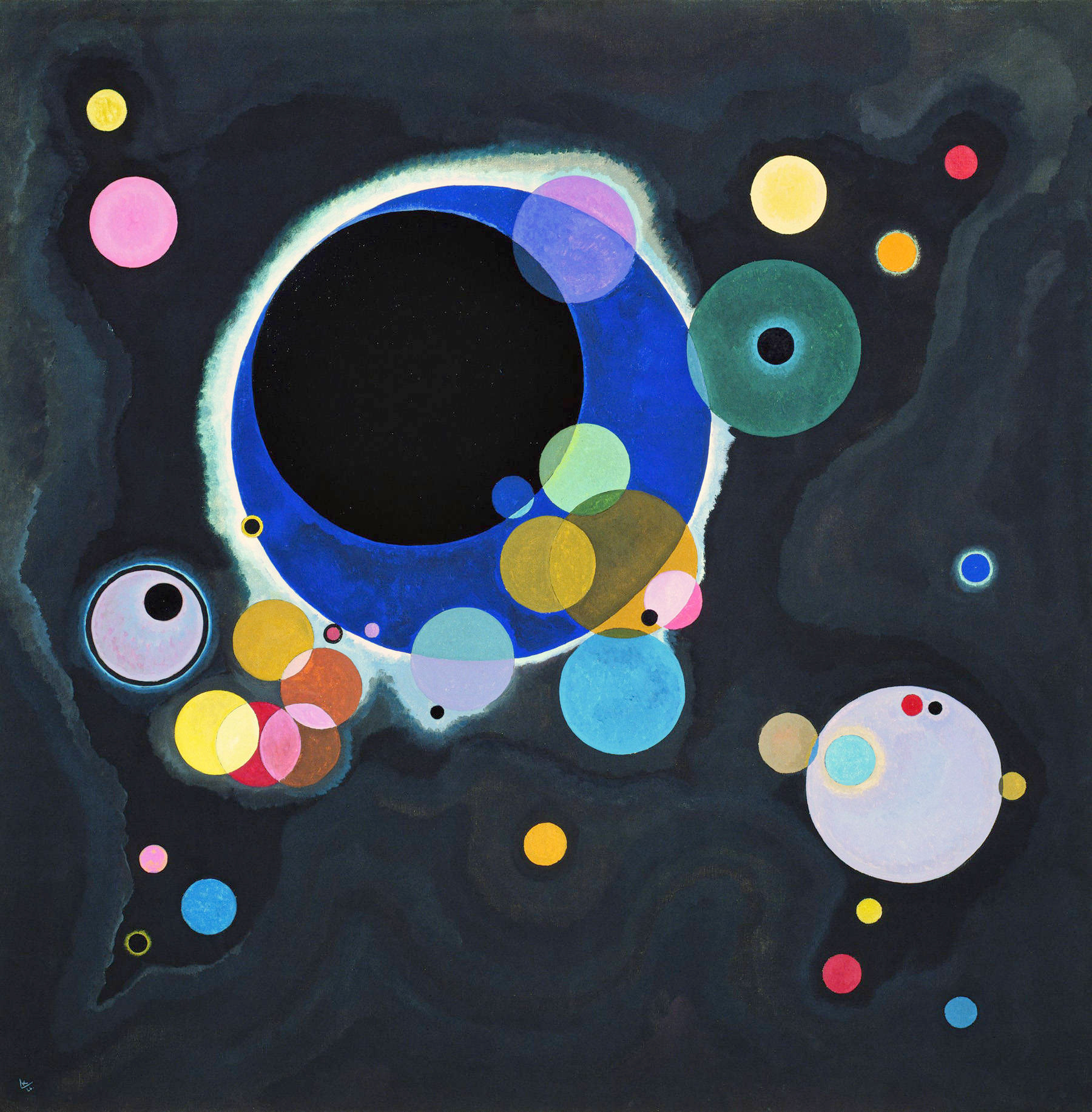
Several Circles, 1926, Solomon R. Guggenheim Museum, New York City

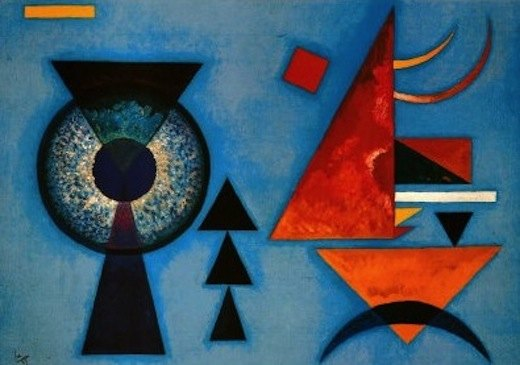
Soft Hard, 1927

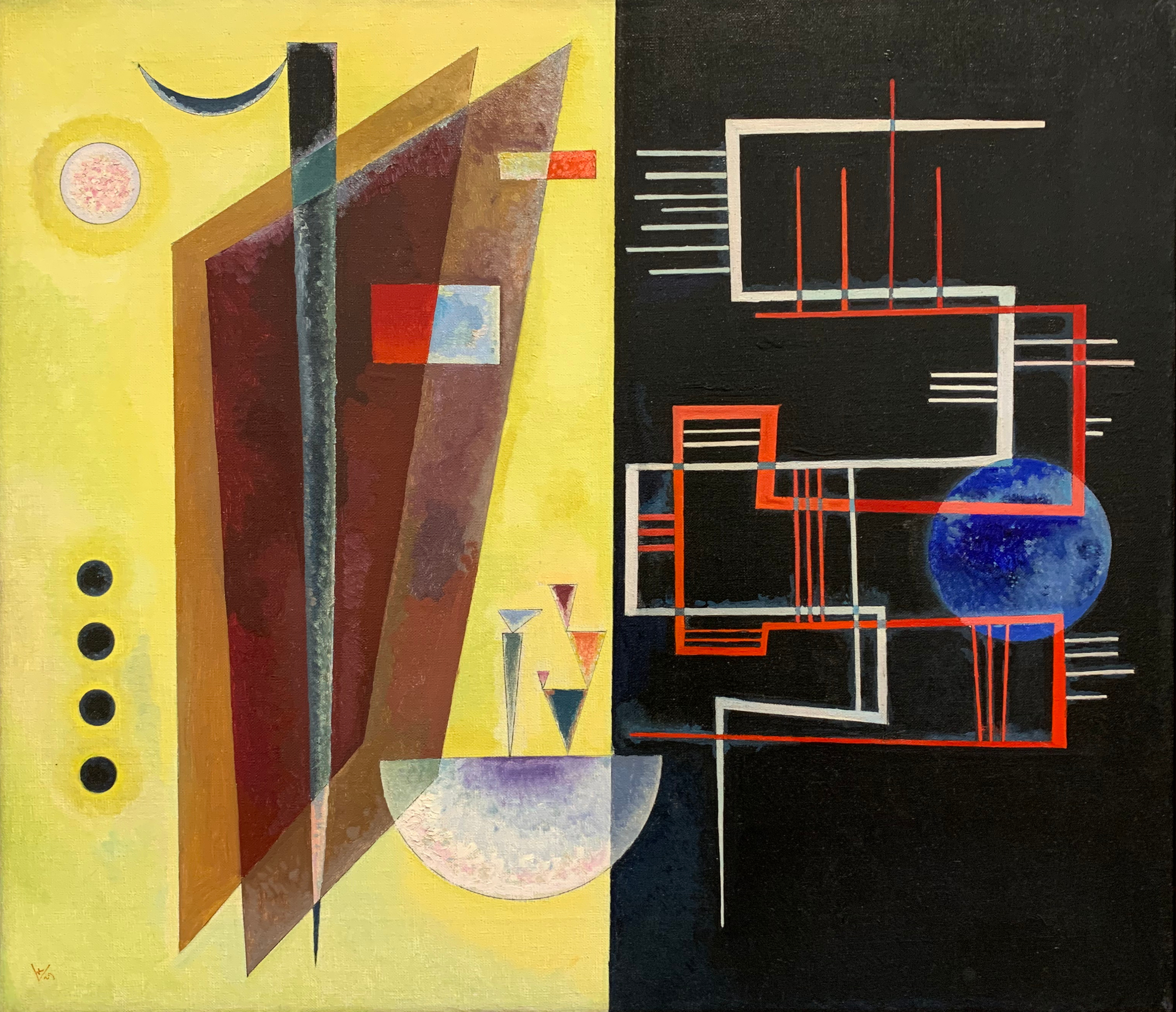
Inner Alliance, 1929, Albertina, Vienna

=== Great Synthesis (1934–1944) ===
Living in an apartment in Paris, Kandinsky created his work in a living-room studio. Biomorphic forms with supple, non-geometric outlines appear in his paintings—forms which suggest microscopic organisms but express the artist's inner life. Kandinsky used original colour compositions, evoking Slavic popular art. He also occasionally mixed sand with paint to give a granular, rustic texture to his paintings.

This period corresponds to a synthesis of Kandinsky's previous work in which he used all elements, enriching them. In 1936 and 1939, he painted his final two major compositions, the type of elaborate canvases he had not produced for many years. Composition IX has highly contrasted, powerful diagonals whose central form gives the impression of an embryo in the womb. Small squares of colours and coloured bands stand out against the black background of Composition X as star fragments (or filaments), while enigmatic hieroglyphs with pastel tones cover a large maroon mass which seems to float in the upper-left corner of the canvas. In Kandinsky's work, some characteristics are obvious, while certain touches are more discreet and veiled; they reveal themselves only progressively to those who deepen their connection with his work. He intended his forms (which he subtly harmonised and placed) to resonate with the observer's soul.

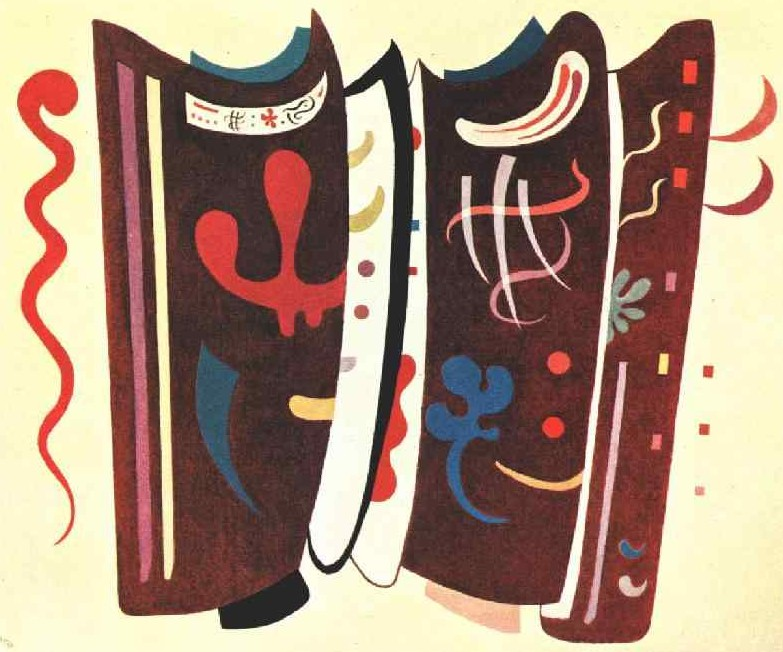
Brown with supplement, 1935, Museum Boijmans Van Beuningen, Rotterdam

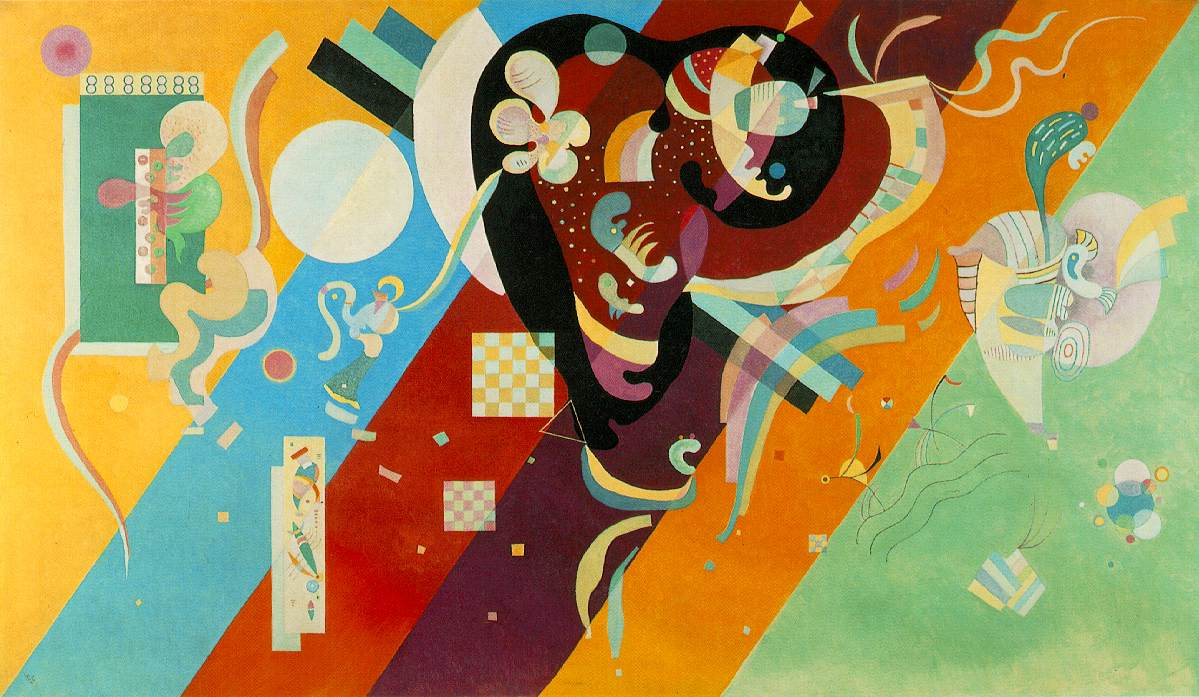
Composition IX, 1936, Musée national d'art moderne, Paris

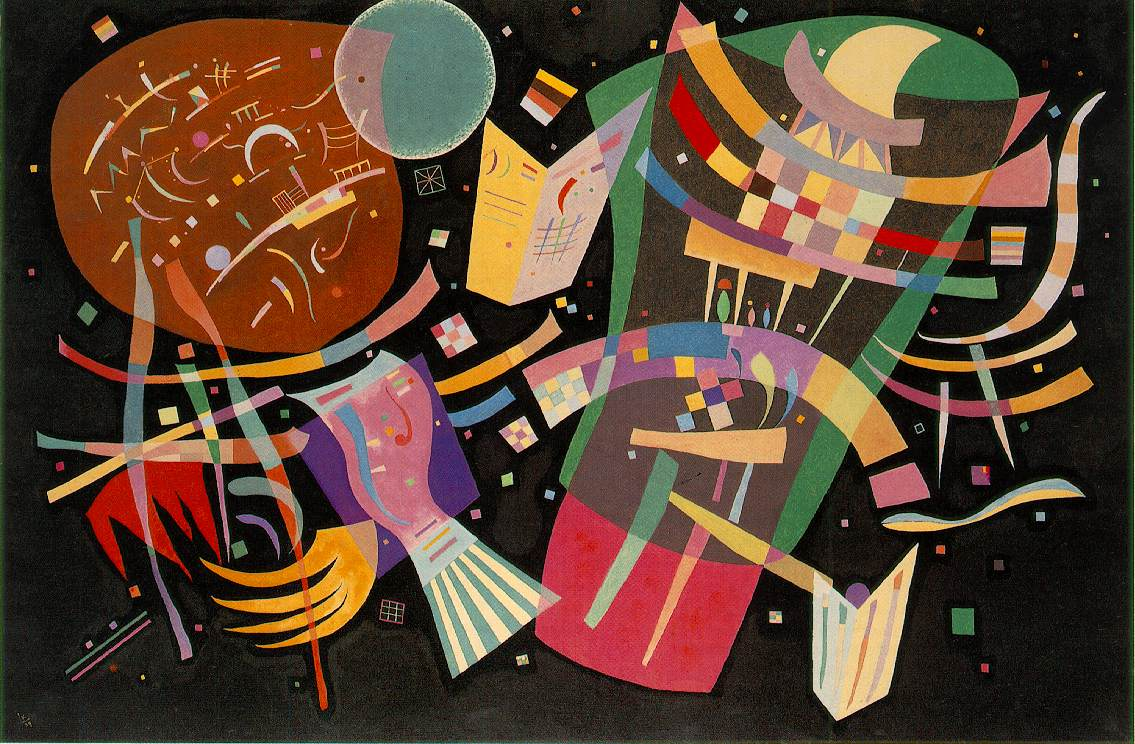
Composition X, 1939, Kunstsammlung Nordrhein-Westfalen, Düsseldorf

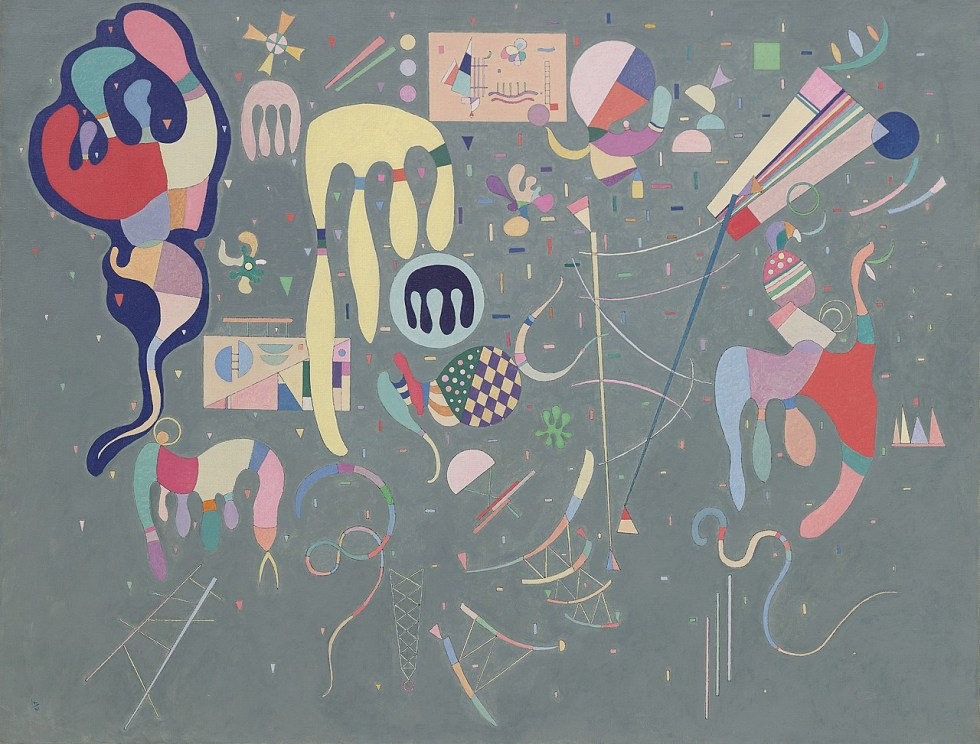
Various Actions, 1941, Solomon R. Guggenheim Museum, New York

== Kandinsky's conception of art ==
=== The artist as prophet ===
Composition VII, Tretyakov Gallery. According to Kandinsky, this is the most complex piece he ever painted (1913).

Writing that "music is the ultimate teacher", Kandinsky embarked upon the first seven of his ten Compositions. The first three survive only in black-and-white photographs taken by fellow artist and friend Gabriele Münter. Composition I (1910) was destroyed by a British air raid on the city of Braunschweig in Lower Saxony on the night of 14 October 1944.

While studies, sketches, and improvisations exist (particularly of Composition II), a Nazi raid on the Bauhaus in the 1930s resulted in the confiscation of Kandinsky's first three Compositions. All three were destroyed during World War II.

Some of Kandinsky's works such as his now-lost painting Zweierlei Rot (1916) were displayed in the state-sponsored Degenerate Art exhibition. Works confiscated during the "degenerate art" campaign were either sold, exchanged or destroyed. A full inventory of more than 16,000 pieces of art can be accessed through the Victoria and Albert Museum website. This includes works by Kandinsky.

Fascinated by Christian eschatology and the perception of a coming New Age, a common theme among Kandinsky's first seven Compositions is the apocalypse (the end of the world as we know it). Writing of the "artist as prophet" in his book, Concerning the Spiritual in Art, Kandinsky created paintings in the years immediately preceding World War I showing a coming cataclysm which would alter individual and social reality. Having a devout belief in Orthodox Christianity, Kandinsky drew upon the biblical stories of Noah's Ark, Jonah and the whale, Christ's resurrection, the four horsemen of the Apocalypse in the book of Revelation, Russian folktales and the common mythological experiences of death and rebirth. Never attempting to picture any one of these stories as a narrative, he used their veiled imagery as symbols of the archetypes of death–rebirth and destruction–creation he felt were imminent in the pre-World War I world.

As he stated in Concerning the Spiritual in Art (see below), Kandinsky felt that an authentic artist creating art from "an internal necessity" inhabits the tip of an upward-moving pyramid. This progressing pyramid is penetrating and proceeding into the future. What was odd or inconceivable yesterday is commonplace today; what is avant garde today (and understood only by the few) is common knowledge tomorrow. The modern artist–prophet stands alone at the apex of the pyramid, making new discoveries and ushering in tomorrow's reality. Kandinsky was aware of recent scientific developments and the advances of modern artists who had contributed to radically new ways of seeing and experiencing the world.

Composition IV and later paintings are primarily concerned with evoking a spiritual resonance in viewer and artist. As in his painting of the apocalypse by water (Composition VI), Kandinsky puts the viewer in the situation of experiencing these epic myths by translating them into contemporary terms (with a sense of desperation, flurry, urgency, and confusion). This spiritual communion of viewer-painting-artist/prophet may be described within the limits of words and images.

=== Artistic and spiritual theorist ===
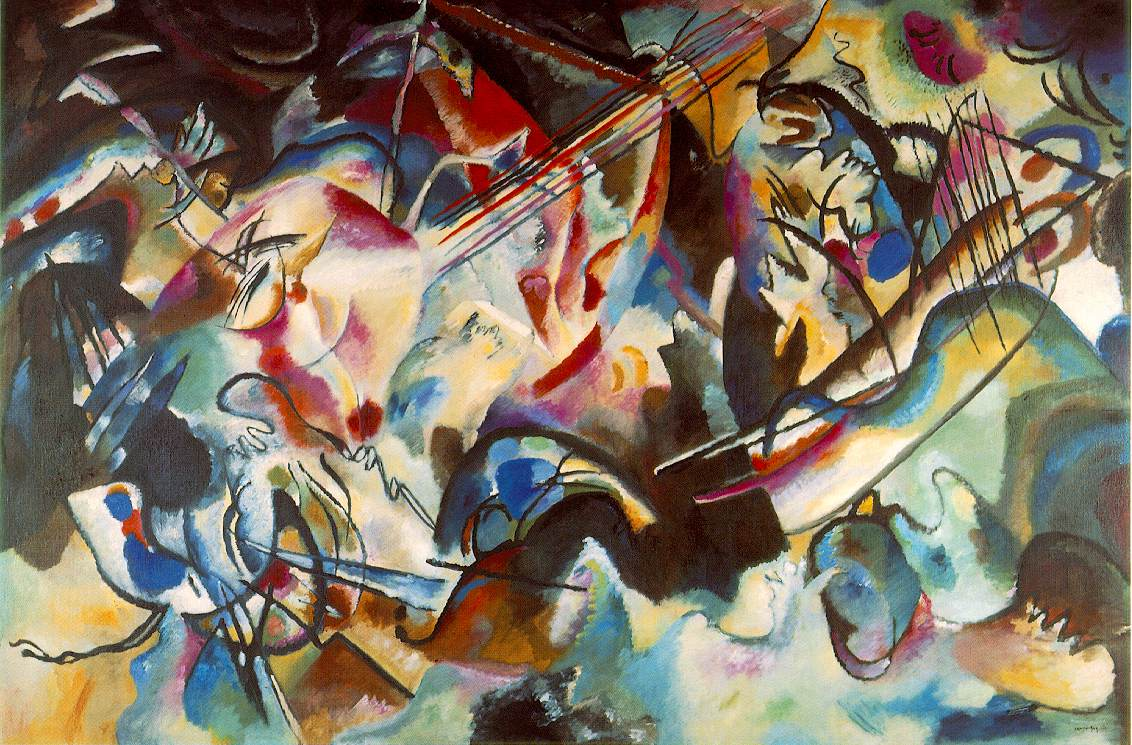
Composition VI (1913)

As the Der Blaue Reiter Almanac essays and theorising with composer Arnold Schoenberg indicate, Kandinsky also expressed the communion between artist and viewer as being available to both the senses and the mind (synesthesia). Hearing tones and chords as he painted, Kandinsky theorised that (for example), yellow is the colour of middle C on a brassy trumpet; black is the colour of closure, and the end of things; and that combinations of colours produce vibrational frequencies, akin to chords played on a piano. In 1871 the young Kandinsky learned to play the piano and cello.

Kandinsky also developed a theory of geometric figures and their relationships, claiming (for example) that the circle is the most peaceful shape and represents the human soul. These theories are explained in Point and Line to Plane.

Kandinsky's legendary stage design for a performance of Mussorgsky's Pictures at an Exhibition illustrates his synesthetic concept of a universal correspondence of forms, colours and musical sounds. In 1928, the stage production premiered at a theater in Dessau. In 2015, the original designs of the stage elements were animated with modern video technology and synchronized with the music according to the preparatory notes of Kandinsky and the director's script of Felix Klee.

In another episode with Münter during the Bavarian abstract expressionist years, Kandinsky was working on Composition VI. From nearly six months of study and preparation, he had intended the work to evoke a flood, baptism, destruction, and rebirth simultaneously. After outlining the work on a mural-sized wood panel, he became blocked and could not go on. Münter told him that he was trapped in his intellect and not reaching the true subject of the picture. She suggested he simply repeat the word uberflut ("deluge" or "flood") and focus on its sound rather than its meaning. Repeating this word like a mantra, Kandinsky painted and completed the monumental work in a three-day span.

== Signature style ==
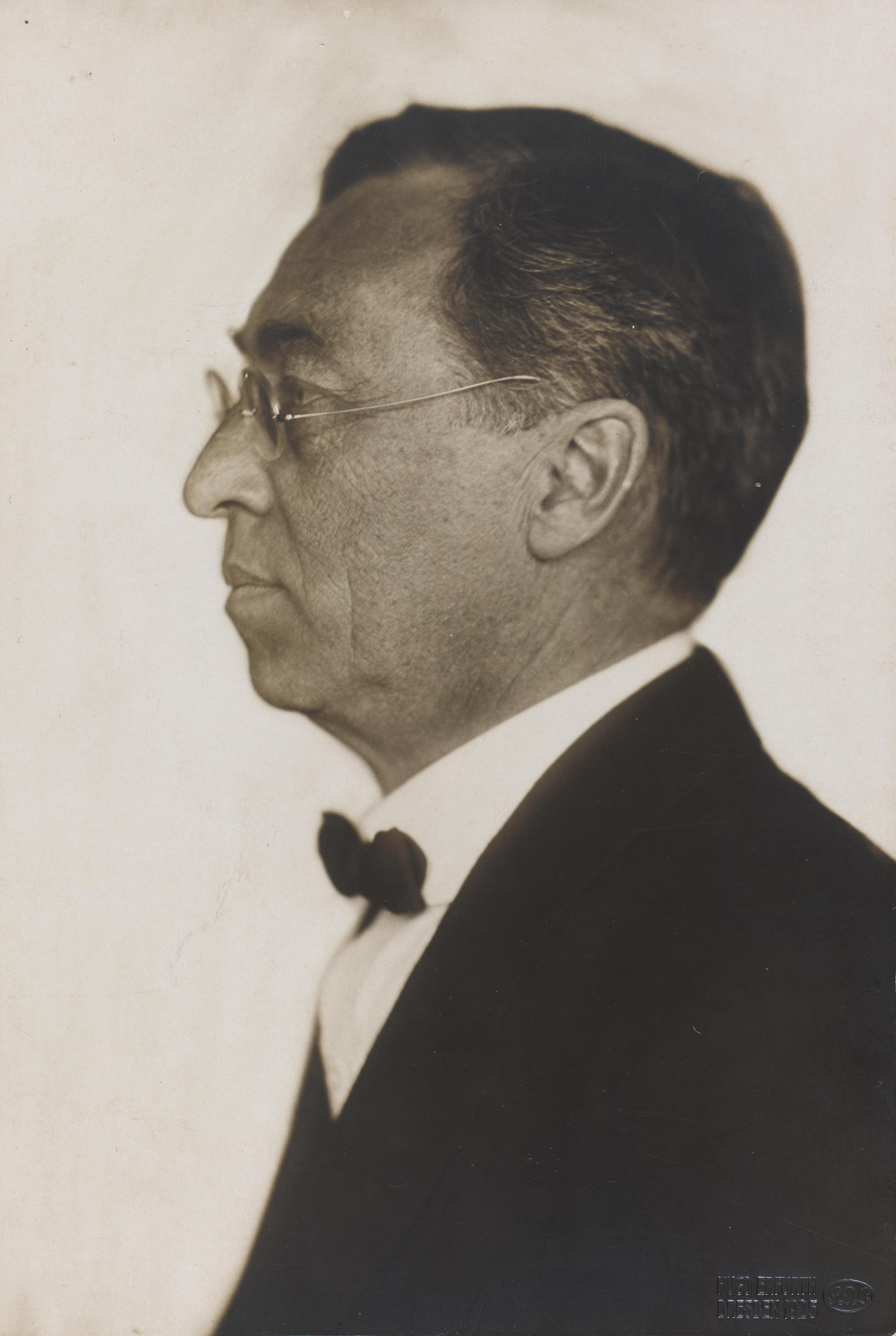
Kandinsky, by Hugo Erfurth, 1925

Wassily Kandinsky's art has a confluence of music and spirituality. With his appreciation for music of his times and kinesthetic disposition, Kandinsky's artworks have a marked style of expressionism in his early years. But he embraced all types of artistic styles of his times and his predecessors i.e. Art Nouveau (sinuous organic forms), Fauvism and Blaue Reiter (shocking colours), Surrealism (mystery) and Bauhaus (constructivism) only to move towards abstractionism as he explored spirituality in art. His object-free paintings display spiritual abstraction suggested by sounds and emotions through a unity of sensation. Driven by the Christian faith and the inner necessity of an artist, his paintings have the ambiguity of the form rendered in a variety of colours as well as resistance against conventional aesthetic values of the art world.

His signature or individual style can be further defined and divided into three categories over the course of his art career: Impressions (representational element), Improvisations (spontaneous emotional reaction) and Compositions (ultimate works of art).

As Kandinsky started moving away from his early inspiration from Impressionism, his paintings became more vibrant, pictographic and expressive with more sharp shapes and clear linear qualities.

But eventually, Kandinsky went further, rejecting pictorial representation with more synesthetic swirling hurricanes of colours and shapes, eliminating traditional references to depth and laying out bare and abstracted glyphs; however, what remained consistent was his spiritual pursuit of expressive forms.

Emotional harmony is another salient feature in the later works of Kandinsky. With diverse dimensions and bright hues balanced through a careful juxtaposition of proportion and colours, he substantiated the universality of shapes in his artworks thus paving the way for further abstraction.

Kandinsky often used black in his paintings to heighten the impact of brightly coloured forms while his forms were often biomorphic approaches to bring surrealism in his art.

== Theoretical writings on art ==
Kandinsky's analyses on forms and colours result not from simple, arbitrary idea-associations but from the painter's inner experience. He spent years creating abstract/sensorially rich paintings, working with form and colour, tirelessly observing his own paintings (along with those of other artists) and noting their effects on his sense of colour. This subjective experience is something that anyone can do—not scientific/objective observations, but inner/subjective ones, referred to by French philosopher Michel Henry as "absolute subjectivity" or the "absolute phenomenological life".

Published in Munich in 1911, Kandinsky's text Über das Geistige in der Kunst (Concerning the spiritual in art) defines three types of painting: impressions, improvisations and compositions. While impressions are based on an external reality that serves as a starting point, improvisations and compositions depict images emergent from the unconscious, though composition is developed from a more formal point of view.

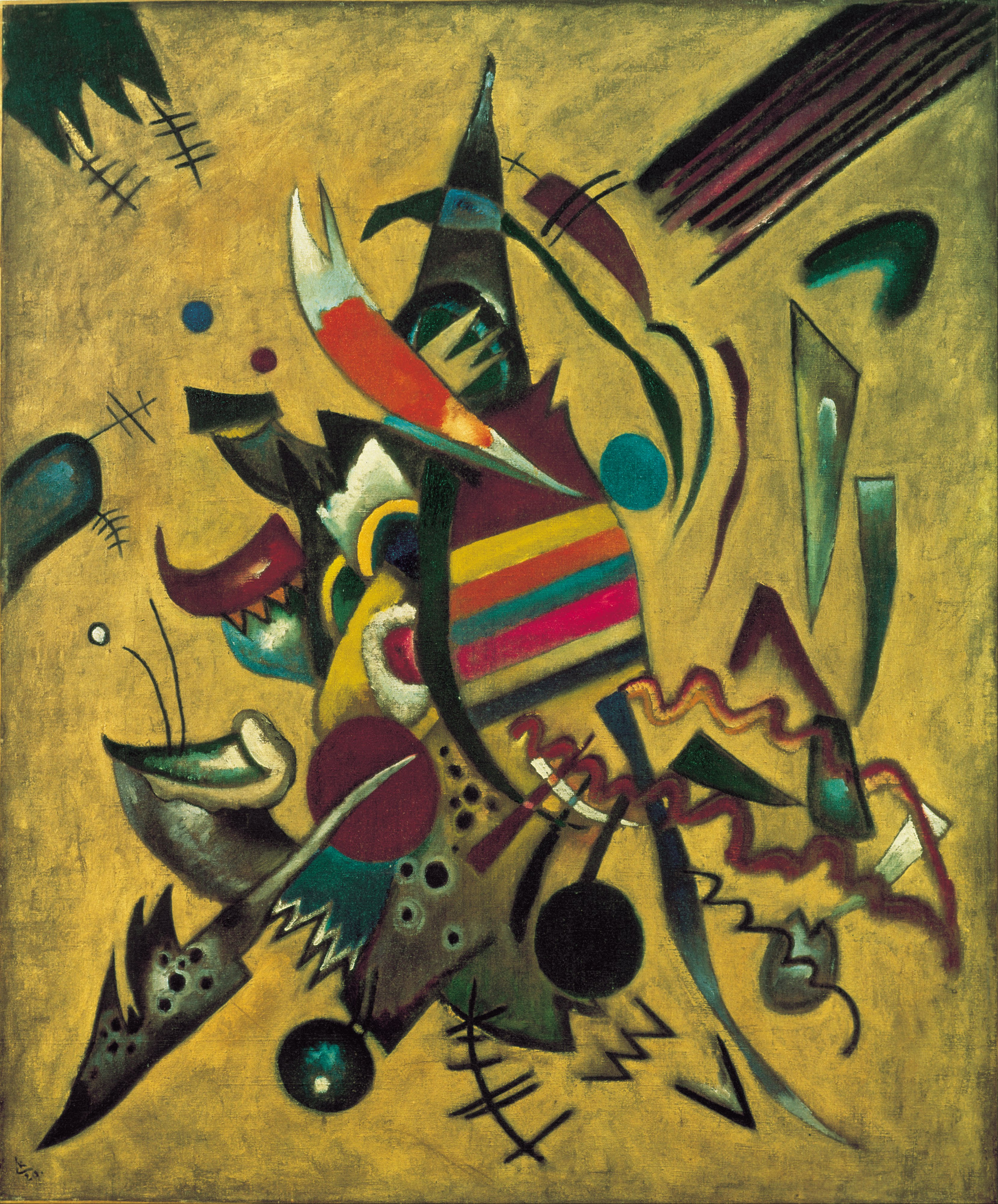
Points, 1920, 110.3 cm × 91.8 cm (43.4 in × 36.1 in), Ohara Museum of Art

== Personal life ==
After graduating in 1892, Kandinsky married his cousin, Anja Chimiakina, and became a lecturer in Jurisprudence at the University of Moscow.

In the summer of 1902, Kandinsky invited Gabriele Münter to join him at his summer painting classes just south of Munich in the Alps. She accepted the offer and their relationship became more personal than professional. In 1911, the German expressionist painter was one of several artists joining Kandinsky in his Blue Rider (Der Blaue Reiter) group, which ended with the onset of World War I.

Kandinsky and Münter became engaged in the summer of 1903 while he was still married to Anja and travelled extensively through Europe, Russia and North Africa until 1908. He was divorced from Anja in 1911.

From 1906 to 1908, Kandinsky travelled across Europe. In 1909, Münter bought a summerhouse in the small Bavarian town of Murnau and the couple happily entertained colleagues there. The property is still known as Russenhaus and she would later use the basement to hide many works (by Kandinsky and others) from the Nazis. Upon returning to Munich, Kandinsky founded the Neue Kunstler Vereinigung (New Artists' Association) in 1909.

He returned to Moscow in 1914 when the first World War broke out. The relationship between Kandinsky and Münter worsened due to mutual tensions and disappointments over his lack of commitment to marriage. Their relationship formally ended in 1916 in Stockholm.

In 1916, he met Nina Nikolaevna Andreevskaya (1899–1980), whom he married on 11 February 1917 when she was 17 or 18 and he was 50 years old. At the end of 1917, they had a son, Wsevolod, or Lodya as he was called in the family. Lodya died in June 1920 and there were no more children.

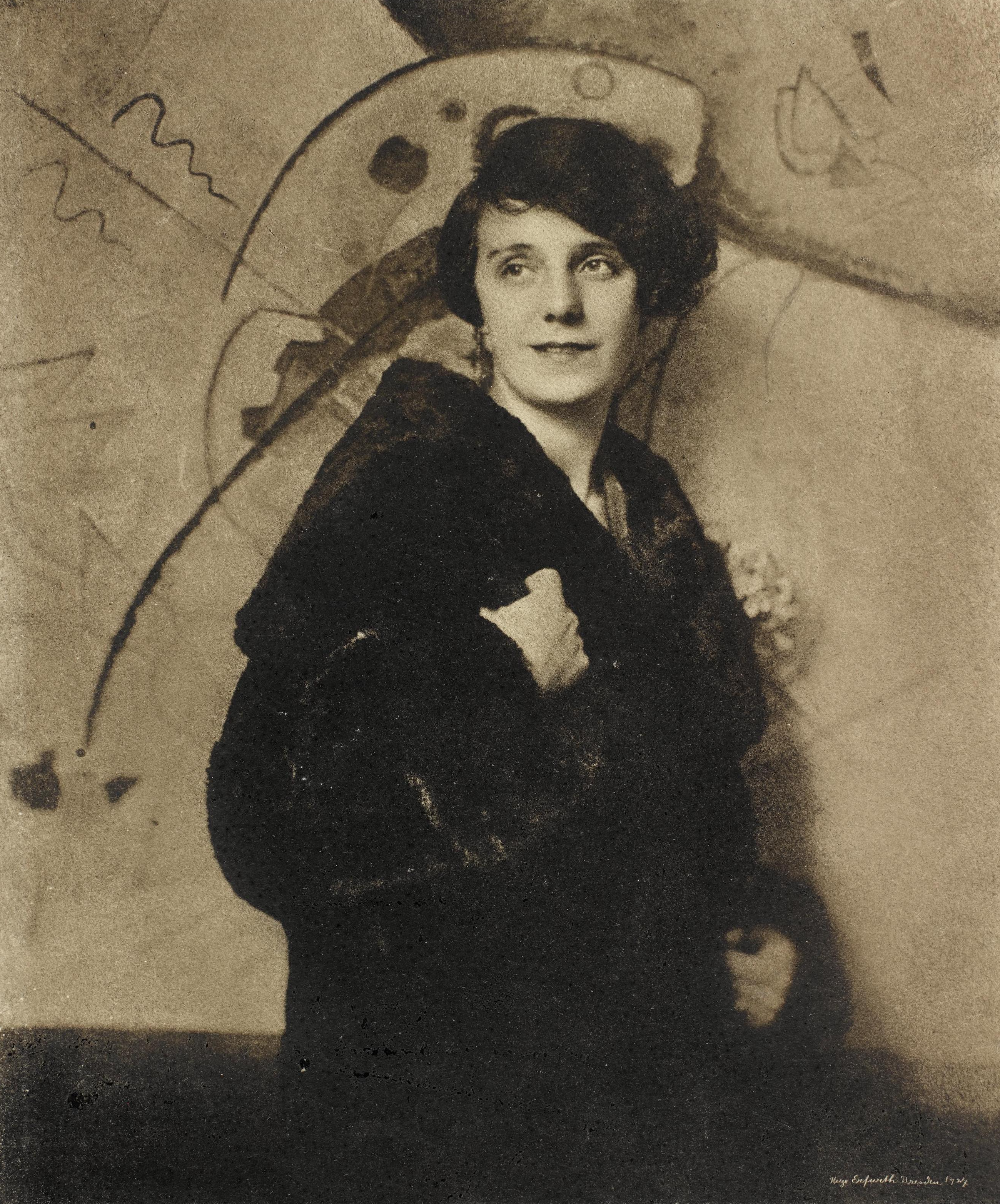
Nina Kandinsky, by Hugo Erfurth, 1927

After the Russian Revolution, he had opportunities in Germany, to which he returned in 1920. There, he taught at the Bauhaus school of art and architecture from 1922 until the Nazis closed it in 1933.

He then moved to France with his wife, where he lived for the rest of his life, becoming a French citizen in 1939 and producing some of his most prominent art.

He died in Neuilly-sur-Seine on 13 December 1944.

== Art market ==
In 2012, Christie's auctioned Kandinsky's Studie für Improvisation 8 (Study for Improvisation 8), a 1909 view of a man wielding a broadsword in a rainbow-hued village, for $23 million. The painting had been on loan to the Kunstmuseum Winterthur in Switzerland since 1960 and was sold to a European collector by the Volkart Foundation, the charitable arm of the Swiss commodities trading firm Volkart Brothers. Before this sale, the artist's last record was set in 1990 when Sotheby's sold his Fugue (1914) for $20.9 million. On 16 November 2016, Christie's auctioned Kandinsky's Rigide et courbé (Rigid and bent), a large 1935 abstract painting, for $23.3 million, a new record for Kandinsky. Solomon R. Guggenheim originally purchased the painting directly from the artist in 1936, but it was not exhibited after 1949; it was then sold at auction to a private collector in 1964 by the Solomon R. Guggenheim Museum.

In 2023, Sotheby’s London sold Kandinsky's 1910 painting Murnau mit Kirche II (Murnau with Church II) for $44.8 million, a record for Kandinsky's work. On 17 November 2026, Christie’s sold Betonte Ecken (1922–23) for $74 million ($85.8 million with fees), setting a new auction record for Kandinsky.

== Nazi-looted art ==
In July 2001, Jen Lissitzky, the son of artist El Lissitzky, filed a restitution claim against the Beyeler Foundation in Basel, Switzerland, for Kandinsky's Improvisation No. 10. A settlement was reached in 2002.

In 2013, the Lewenstein family filed a claim for the restitution of Kandinsky's Painting with Houses held by the Stedelijk Museum. In 2020, a committee established by the Dutch minister of culture found fault with the behaviour of the Restitution Committee, causing a scandal where two of its members, including its chairman, resigned. Later that year, a court in Amsterdam ruled that the Stedelijk Museum could retain the painting from the Jewish Lewenstein collection despite the Nazi theft. However, in August 2021, the Amsterdam City Council decided to return the painting to the Lewenstein family.

In 2017, Robert Colin Lewenstein, Francesca Manuela Davis and Elsa Hannchen Guidotti filed suit against Bayerische Landesbank (BLB) for the restitution of Kandinsky's Das Bunte Leben.

== See also ==
- Bibliothèque Kandinsky
- Goethe's Theory of Colours
- Kandinsky and Theosophy
- Kandinsky Prize
- List of Russian artists
- Russian avant-garde
- Wassily Chair
