= Bibliothèque Kandinsky =

Library in Paris, France

Coordinates: 48.8603°N 2.3520°E

The Kandinsky Library (or Bibliothèque Kandinsky in French) is a library of 20th and 21st century visual arts located at the Pompidou Centre in Paris, France. It also serves as the Documentation and Research Centre of the French National Museum of Modern Art (Musée national d'art moderne / Centre de création industrielle, or MNAM / CCI).

It is named after the Russian painter and art theorist Wassily Kandinsky, a pioneer in abstract art and a leading figure in early 20th century visual arts.

== Collections ==
Created in 2002, the Kandinsky Library includes over 200,000 works (art books, art journals, photographs, audio recordings, videos, artists' archives, etc.) from about 5,000 artists, designers, and architects. A large fraction of these collections come from the former Centre national d'art contemporain (CNAC). Since the acquisition of the Paul Destribats collection in 2006, the Kandinsky Library is one of the larger visual art collections in the world for the first half of the 20th century.

== See also ==
- List of libraries in France
