= 1913 in art =

Events from the year 1913 in art.

== Events ==
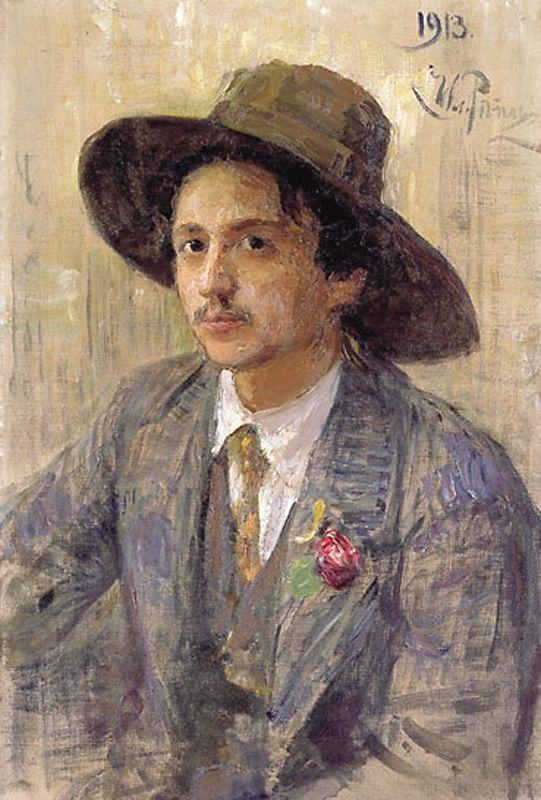
Portrait of Isaak Brodsky by Ilya Repin

- January 16 (OS) – Ilya Repin's painting Ivan the Terrible and His Son Ivan in the Tretyakov Gallery, Moscow, is slashed.
- January 19 – Lovis Corinth's retrospective opens at the Munich Secession galleries. This year the "New Munich Secession" splits from the Munich Secession.
- End of January – Franz Marc's Collection II opens at the Moderne Galerie Heinrich Thannhauser in Munich. This is followed at the gallery in February by the first major retrospective of Picasso's work.
- February–March – English painter Olive Hockin is implicated in suffragette attacks.

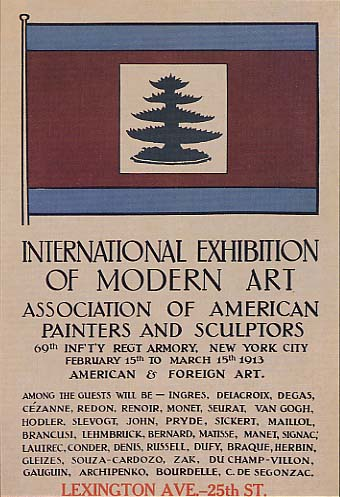
Armory Show poster

- February 17 – The Armory Show opens in New York City. It displays works of artists who are to become some of the most influential painters of the early 20th century.
- March 10 – French sculptor Camille Claudel is committed by her family to a psychiatric hospital where she will remain until her death in 1943.
- April – Marcel Duchamp withdraws from painting and begins working as a library assistant in the Sainte-Geneviève Library in Paris to be able to earn a living wage while concentrating on scholarship and working on his The Bride Stripped Bare by Her Bachelors, Even.
- May – The Paul Émile Chabas painting September Morn provokes a charge of indency when displayed in the window of a Chicago art gallery.
- May 27 – Die Brücke dissolved.
- May 29 – The ballet The Rite of Spring, with music by Igor Stravinsky conducted by Pierre Monteux, choreography by Vaslav Nijinsky and design by Nicholas Roerich, is premièred by Sergei Diaghilev's Ballets Russes at the Théâtre des Champs-Élysées in Paris, its modernism provoking one of the most famous classical music riots in history. The audience includes Gabriele D'Annunzio, Coco Chanel, Marcel Duchamp, Harry Graf Kessler and Maurice Ravel.
- August–September – Ernst Ludwig Kirchner spends the summer painting on the island of Fehmarn; returning to Berlin he begins his series of street scenes from around the Potsdamer Platz.
- September 19 – First German Autumn Salon opens in Berlin, featuring 366 paintings by 90 artists from 12 countries, notably Franz Marc; Guillaume Apollinaire and Filippo Tommaso Marinetti deliver accompanying lectures.
- Autumn – The Neue Galerie in Berlin reopens with displays of the work of Picasso and others associated with French Modernism.
- October – August Macke paints at Hilterfingen.
- October 18 – Monument to the Battle of the Nations at Leipzig, designed by Bruno Schmitz incorporating sculptures by Christian Behrens and Franz Metzner, is inaugurated.
- December 12 – Leonardo da Vinci's Mona Lisa, stolen from the Louvre in 1911, is located in Florence when Vincenzo Peruggia attempts to sell it. It is returned to Paris on December 30.
- Generación del 13 established in Chile.
- The London Group is formed by merger of the Camden Town Group and the Vorticists; it will hold its first exhibition in March 1914.
- Target, the first exhibition of Rayonism.
- Maurice Utrillo has his first solo exhibition, at the Galerie Blot in Paris, but attracts little notice at this time.
- Omega Workshops established in London by Roger Fry and other members of the Bloomsbury Group to produce artist-designed furniture and textiles. Wyndham Lewis and others secede in October.
- First observation of a chimpanzee drawing.
- English connoisseur Hugh Blaker discovers and acquires the "Isleworth Mona Lisa".
- Guillaume Apollinaire's The Cubist Painters, Aesthetic Meditations (Les Peintres Cubistes, Méditations Esthétiques) is published in Paris.
- The Russian Futurist opera Victory Over the Sun by Mikhail Matyushin and Aleksei Kruchyonykh with stage design by Kazimir Malevich premieres in St. Petersburg, Russia. It is for this opus that Malevich creates his first Black Square as part of his stage design. Some consider this the beginning of Malevich's Suprematist period

== Works ==
Jean Metzinger, 1912-1913, L'Oiseau bleu (The Blue Bird), oil on canvas, 230 x 196 cm, Musée d'Art Moderne de la Ville de Paris

=== Graphic works ===
- Anna Ancher – Fru Ane Brøndum i den blå stue (Portrait of the Artist's Mother)
- Max Beckmann – Sinking of the Titanic
- Vanessa Bell
  - Design for Overmantel Mural
  - Street Corner Conversation
  - Summer Camp
- George Bellows
  - Cliff Dwellers
  - Evening Blue
- Umberto Boccioni
  - Dynamism of a Cyclist
  - Dynamism of a Man's Head
  - Dynamism of a Soccer Player
- Pierre Bonnard – Dining Room in the Country
- Marc Chagall – Self-Portrait with Seven Fingers
- Giorgio de Chirico
  - The Anxious Journey
  - Ariadne
  - The Soothsayer's Recompense
  - The Transformed Dream
- Charles F. Church - The Dangerous Servants - Evils of Coffee, Alcohol and Tobacco
- Salvador Dalí (aged about 9) – Vilabertran
- Robert Delaunay
  - Cardiff Team
  - Simultaneous Contrasts: Sun and Moon
- Charles Demuth – Mountain with Red House
- André Derain – Portrait of a Girl in Black
- Pavel Filonov – The Banquet of Kings
- Henri Gaudier-Brzeska – Self-portrait
- Albert Gleizes
  - Football Players
  - Man in a Hammock
  - The Publisher Eugène Figuière
- J. W. Godward
  - The Belvedere
  - Le Billet Doux
  - Golden Hours
  - In the Tepidarium
  - La Pensierosa
- Natalia Goncharova – Cyclist
- Spencer Gore – The West Pier, Brighton
- Juan Gris
  - Still Life with a Guitar
  - Violin and Playing Cards on a Table
- Childe Hassam – Surf, Isles of Shoals
- Erich Heckel – To the Convalescent Woman (triptych)
- Albert Herter – The Pageant of Nations (for St. Francis Hotel, San Francisco)
- James Dickson Innes – Arenig, North Wales
- Wassily Kandinsky
  - Composition VI
  - Composition VII
  - Improvisation No. 30 (Cannons)
  - Landscape with Red Spots
- Ludvig Karsten – The Blue Kitchen
- Roger de La Fresnaye
  - Married Life (Barnes Foundation)
  - The Conquest of the Air (La conquête de l'air; Museum of Modern Art, New York)
- Ernst Ludwig Kirchner
  - Berlin Street Scene
  - Portrait of Erna Schilling
  - Street, Berlin
- Gustav Klimt – The Maiden
- Laura Knight – Self Portrait with Nude
- Oskar Kokoschka – Double Portrait of Oskar Kokoschka and Alma Mahler
- František Kupka – The Cathedral (Katedrála)
- Jacques Henri Lartigue – Le Grand Prix A.C.F. (photograph)
- John Lavery – Portrait of Auguste Rodin
- Fernand Léger – Contrasting Forms
- August Macke
  - Lady in a Green Jacket
  - People at the Blue Lake
  - Promenade
  - Sunlight Walk (Sonniger Weg)
  - Tightrope walker (Seiltänzerin)
  - Two Girls
- Kazimir Malevich
  - Bureau and Room
  - Cow and Fiddle
  - Head of a Peasant Girl (1912–13)
  - The Knife Grinder (Principle of Glittering) (1912–13)
  - Portrait of Mikhail Matyushin
- Franz Marc
  - The Bewitched Mill
  - Birth of the Wolves (woodcut)
  - Deer in the Forest I
  - Fate of the Animals (Tierschicksale)
  - The Foxes
  - The Tower of Blue Horses (missing since 1945)
  - The Wolves (Balkan War)
- Henri Matisse
  - Arab Coffeehouse
  - The Blue Window
- Sidney Meteyard – "I Am Half-Sick of Shadows", Said the Lady of Shalott
- Jean Metzinger
  - En Canot (Im Boot)
  - Man with Pipe
  - Woman with a fan (1913)
- Edvard Munch – Morning Yawn
- C. R. W. Nevinson – The Arrival
- Franz Nölken – Max Reger
- Francis Picabia – Udnie
- Pablo Picasso
  - Guitar (Musée Picasso, Paris)
  - Harlequin (1913)
- Iso Rae – Rogation Sunday
- John Singer Sargent – Portrait of Henry James
- Egon Schiele – Dämmernde Stadt
- Charles Sims – The Wood beyond the World
- Vardges Sureniants – Ferdowsi reading Shahnameh to Shah Mahmud Ghaznavi
- Albert Chevallier Tayler – The Quiet Hour
- Harry Watrous - The Drop Sinister, What Shall We Do with It? (circa)

=== Sculptures ===
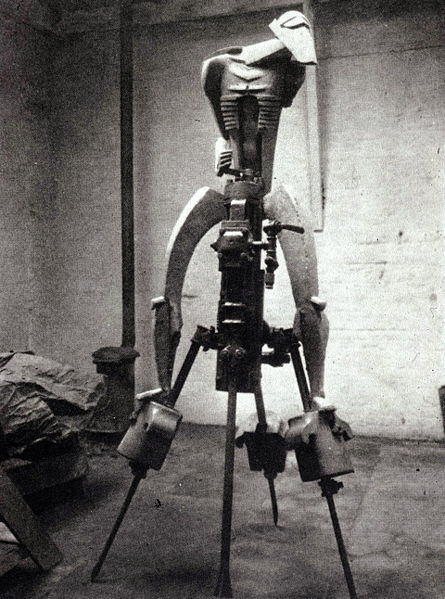
Epstein's Rock Drill in original form on machine base

- Karl Bitter – Carl Schurz Monument, New York City
- Umberto Boccioni
  - Development of a Bottle in Space
  - Unique Forms of Continuity in Space
- Joseph Csaky – Figure de Femme Debout (Figure Habillée)
- Marcel Duchamp – Bicycle Wheel (readymade)
- Jacob Epstein – The Rock Drill (original form)
- Four Southern Poets Monument, Augusta, Georgia
- James Earle Fraser – Buffalo nickel (United States coinage)
- Carl Jacobsen – The Little Mermaid
- Wilhelm Lehmbruck
  - Emporsteigender Jüngling
  - Große Sinnende
- Pietro Porcelli – Explorers' Monument, Fremantle, Western Australia
- Lorado Taft – Fountain of the Great Lakes
- Albert Toft – King Edward VII Memorial, Birmingham
- Elsa von Freytag-Loringhoven – Enduring Ornament (found object)
- Mahonri Young – Seagull Monument, Salt Lake City

== Births ==
- January 15 – Eugène Brands, Dutch painter (died 2002)
- January 29 – Reuben Kadish, American artist and educator (died 1992)
- January 30 – Amrita Sher-Gil, Hungarian-Indian painter (died 1941)
- February 15 – William Scott, Ulster Scots painter (died 1989)
- March 8 – Peter Wilson, English art auctioneer (died 1984)
- March 12 – Max Leognany, French artist (died 1994)
- March 19 – Mary Henry, American painter (died 2009)
- March 23 – Abidin Dino, Turkish artist (died 1993)
- March 29 – Hyman Bloom, Latvian American painter (died 2009)
- April 21 – Norman Parkinson, English fashion photographer (died 1990)
- May 6 – Marianne Appel, American mural painter and puppet designer (died 1988)
- May 7 - Mary Spencer Watson, English sculptor (died 2006)
- May 27 – Wols, born Alfred Otto Wolfgang Schulze, German-born painter and draughtsman (died 1951)
- July 12 – Roger Testu, French cartoonist (died 2008)
- July 22 – Robert C. Turner, American potter (died 2005)
- July 27 – Philip Guston, Canadian-born American Abstract Expressionist painter and printmaker (died 1980)
- August 10 – Lajos Tscheligi, Hungarian painter (died 2003)
- September 1 – Ludwig Merwart, Austrian painter and graphic artist (died 1979)
- September 25 – Tony O'Malley, Irish painter (died 2003)
- September 28 – Warja Honegger-Lavater, Swiss artist and illustrator (died 2007)
- October 22 – Robert Capa, born Endre Friedmann, Hungarian-born war photographer (died 1954)
- November 21 – Tomie Ohtake, Japanese-Brazilian artist (died 2015)
- December 13
  - Susanne Suba, Hungarian-born American watercolorist and illustrator (died 2012)
  - Vladimir Tretchikoff, Russian artist (died 2006)
- December 24 – Ad Reinhardt, American painter and writer (died 1967)
- Full date unknown
  - Russell Brockbank, Canadian-born cartoonist (died 1979)
  - Mercedes Matter, born Mercedes Carles, American painter (died 2001)

== Deaths ==
- January 6 – Gyula Juhász, Hungarian sculptor and engraver (born 1876)
- March 8 – Louis Saint-Gaudens, American sculptor (born 1854)
- March 13 – Félix Resurrección Hidalgo, Filipino painter (born 1855)
- April 20 – Vilhelm Bissen, Danish sculptor (born 1836)
- May 10 – Andreas Aubert, Norwegian art historian (born 1851)
- June 23 - Marc-Louis Solon, French-born ceramic artist (born 1835)
- July 10 – Mikoláš Aleš, Czech painter (born 1852)
- August 2 - George Hitchcock, American painter (born 1850)
- August 7 – Fernand Pelez, French painter (born 1843)
- September 28 – Sir Alfred East, English painter (born 1844)
- October 5 – Hans von Bartels, German painter (born 1856)
- Full date unknown – Caroline Shawk Brooks, American sculptor (born 1840)
