= 1913 in France =

- Decades: 1890s; 1900s; 1910s; 1920s; 1930s
- See also: History of France; Timeline of French history; List of years in France

Events from the year 1913 in France.

== Incumbents ==
- President: Armand Fallières (until 18 February), Raymond Poincaré (starting 18 February)
- President of the Council of Ministers:
  - until 21 January: Raymond Poincaré
  - 21 January-22 March: Aristide Briand
  - 22 March-9 December: René Viviani
  - starting 9 December: Gaston Doumergue

== Events ==
- 17 January – Raymond Poincaré is elected president
- 3 February – Trial of the remnants of the Bonnot gang begins.
- 29 May – Igor Stravinsky's ballet score The Rite of Spring is premiered in Paris.
- 20 August – 700 feet above Buc, parachutist Adolphe Pegoud jumps from an airplane and lands safely.
- 23 September – Aviator Roland Garros flies over the Mediterranean.
- 12 December – Vincenzo Perugia tries to sell Mona Lisa in Florence and is arrested.
- 30 December – Italy returns Mona Lisa to France.

== Arts ==
- Pierre Bonnard - Salle à manger à la campagne
- Marc Chagall - Autoportrait aux sept doigts
- Robert Delaunay - L'Équipe de Cardiff
- Albert Gleizes
  - Les Joueurs de football
  - L'Homme au hamac
  - Portrait de l'éditeur Eugène Figuière
- Dominique Lang - Le barrage
- Albert Marquet - La Citadelle à Tanger
- Jean Metzinger
  - En Canot
  - Le Fumeur
  - La Femme à l'Éventail
- Francis Picabia - Udnie

== Film ==
- Louis Feuillade - Fantômas (1913 serial)

== Literature ==
- Alain-Fournier - Le Grand Meaulnes
- Maurice Barrès - La colline inspirée
- Gaston Leroux - Rouletabille chez le Tsar
- Octave Mirbeau - Dingo
- Marcel Proust - À la recherche du temps perdu

== Music ==
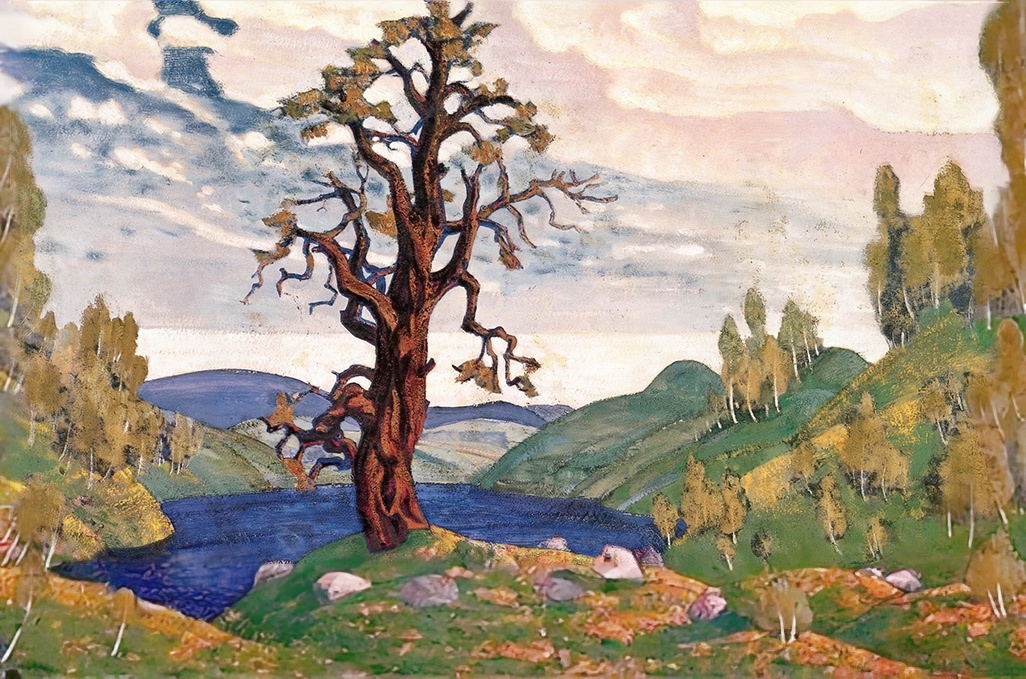
Concept design from Diaghilev's 1913 production

- Claude Debussy
  - Images pour orchestre
  - Jeux
  - La boîte à joujoux (piano score only)
  - Syrinx
- Gabriel Fauré - 2 Pieces, Op. 104
- Maurice Ravel - Prélude, M.65
- Albert Roussel - Le festin de l'araignée
- Camille Saint-Saëns
  - Valse gaie, Op. 139
  - La Terre Promise, Op. 140
  - 2 Chorales, Op. 141
- Erik Satie
  - Descriptions automatiques
  - Embryons desséchés
- Igor Stravinsky - Le Sacre du Printemps

== Sport ==
- 29 June – Tour de France begins.
- 27 July – Tour de France ends, won by Philippe Thys of Belgium.

== Births ==
=== January to March ===
- 5 January – Pierre Veuillot, cardinal (died 1968)
- 23 January – Jean-Michel Atlan, painter (died 1960)
- 17 February – Louis Bouyer, priest and writer (died 2004)
- 24 February – François Bourbotte, soccer player (died 1972)
- 27 February – Paul Ricoeur, philosopher (died 2005)
- 3 March – Roger Caillois, writer and intellectual (died 1978)
- 12 March – Max Leognany, artist (died 1994)
- 18 March – René Clément, screenwriter and film director (died 1996)
- 26 March – Maurice Lafforgue, alpine skier (died 1970)
- 26 March – Jacqueline de Romilly, philologist (died 2010)
- 28 March – Jean-Marie Goasmat, cyclist (died 2001)

=== April to June ===
- 14 April – Jean Fournet, conductor (died 2008)
- 18 May – Charles Trenet, singer and songwriter (died 2001)
- 26 May –
  - Pierre Daninos, writer and humorist (died 2005)
  - André Lalande, officer (died 1995)
- 9 June – Jean Nicolas, international soccer player (died 1978)
- 18 June – Pierre Berès, bookseller and antiquarian book collector (died 2008)
- 26 June – Aimé Césaire, poet, author and politician (died 2008)

=== July to December ===
- 1 July – André Tollet, chairman of the Paris liberation committee (died 2001)
- 12 July – Roger Testu, cartoonist (died 2008)
- 13 July – Fabien Galateau, cyclist (died 1995)
- 14 July – René Llense, footballer (died 2014)
- 17 July – Roger Garaudy, author and philosopher (died 2012)
- July – Colette de Jouvenel, daughter of writer Colette (died 1981)
- 31 August – Jacques Foccart, politician (died 1997)
- 10 October – Claude Simon, novelist, recipient of the Nobel Prize in Literature for 1985 (died 2005)
- 13 October – Pierre Jaïs, bridge player (died 1988)
- 7 November – Albert Camus, author, philosopher and journalist, recipient of the Nobel Prize in Literature for 1957 (died 1960)
- 20 November – Charles Bettelheim, economist and historian (died 2006)
- 22 November – Jacqueline Vaudecrane, figure skater (died 2018)
- 29 November – Georges Spénale, writer, poet and politician, President of the European Parliament (died 1983)
- 11 December – Jean Marais, actor (died 1998)

=== Full date unknown ===
- Pierre Probst, cartoonist (died 2007)

== Deaths ==
- 2 January – Léon Teisserenc de Bort, meteorologist (born 1855)
- 14 June – Louis-Robert Carrier-Belleuse, painter and sculptor (born 1848)
- 20 August – Émile Ollivier, statesman, 30th Prime Minister of France (born 1825)
- 6 September – Henri Menier, businessman and adventurer (born 1853)
- 15 November – Camille Armand Jules Marie, Prince de Polignac, nobleman, scholar and major general in the Confederate States Army (born 1832)
- 5 December – Ferdinand Dugué, poet and playwright (born 1816)

== See also ==
- List of French films of 1913
