= 2003 in art =

The year 2003 in art involved various significant events.

== Events ==
- January 21 – The Spire of Dublin is completed.
- May 11 – Benvenuto Cellini's Saliera is stolen from the Kunsthistorisches Museum in Vienna.
- June 15–November 2 – A record number of seven co-curators is involved in the 50th edition of the Venice Biennale, directed by Francesco Bonami.
- August 27 – Leonardo da Vinci's Madonna of the Yarnwinder is stolen from the Duke of Buccleuch collection at Drumlanrig Castle in Scotland. It is recovered in 2007.
- November – Gustav Klimt's Landhaus am Attersee sells for $29,128,000.
- December 25 – Beagle 2 lands on the surface of Mars; its calibration target plate is painted by Damien Hirst.
- date unknown – Central Saint Martins College of Art and Design in London takes over the Byam Shaw School of Art.

== Exhibitions ==
- Jim Sanborn, Critical Assembly, Corcoran School of Art
- Patti Smith, Strange Messenger, The Andy Warhol Museum in Pittsburgh
- November 11 until January 31, 2004 - "Assemblage" (Arman, John Chamberlin, Christo, Joseph Cornell, Jim Dine, Marcel Duchamp, George Herms, Edward Kienholz, Larry Rivers, Jason Rhoades, Dieter Roth, Kurt Schwitters, Daniel Spoerri, Jean Tinguely, and Richard Tuttle) at the David Zwirner Gallery in New York City.

== Awards ==
- Archibald Prize – Geoffrey Dyer, a portrait of Richard Flanagan
- Beck's Futures – Rosalind Nashashibi
- Schock Prize in Visual Arts – Susan Rothenberg
- Turner Prize – Grayson Perry
- The Venice Biennale (June 15 - November 2) -
  - The Lion d'Or Golden Lion for Lifetime Achievement: Michelangelo Pistoletto (Italy) and Carol Rama (Italy)
  - The Lion d'or for best artwork in the main exhibition: Fischli and Weiss (Switzerland)
  - The Lion d'Or for Best Pavilion: Sun-Mei Tse (Luxemburg)
- Wynne Prize – Tim Kyle, Seated Figure

== Works ==
- Eco-Earth Globe, Salem, Oregon
- Jake and Dinos Chapman – Insult to Injury
- Tony Cragg – Stainless Steel Pillar
- Olafur Eliasson – The weather project (installation in Turbine Hall of Tate Modern, London)
- David Fairbairn – Self Portrait DF
- Cornelia Parker – The Distance (A Kiss With String Attached): Subconscious of a Monument (interventionist sculpture)
- Michal Rovner – Data Zone
- Jørn Utzon – Homage to Carl Philipp Emanuel Bach (tapestry in the Sydney Opera House)
- Kehinde Wiley – Go

== Films ==
- Girl with a Pearl Earring
- Mona Lisa Smile
- Sound of Colors
- The Floating Landscape
- Turn Left, Turn Right

== Deaths ==
=== January to March ===
- 9 January – Constantin Kluge, Russian and French painter (b.1912).
- 20 January – Al Hirschfeld, American caricaturist (b.1903).
- 21 January – Tony O'Malley, Irish painter (b.1913).
- 27 January – Louis Archambault, Canadian sculptor (b.1915).
- 2 February – Emerson Woelffer, American painter (b.1914).
- 10 February – Edgar de Evia, Mexican-born American photographer (b.1910).
- 15 February – Vincent Apap, Maltese sculptor (b. 1909)
- 14 March – Jack Goldstein, Canadian-born American performance and conceptual artist turned painter (b.1945).

=== April to June ===
- 9 April – Jorge Oteiza, Spanish sculptor, painter, designer and writer (b.1908).
- 16 April – Graham Stuart Thomas, English horticultural artist, author and garden designer (b.1909).
- 23 April – Fernand Fonssagrives, French photographer (b.1910).
- 25 April – Lynn Chadwick, 88, English sculptor
- 29 May – Pierre Restany, French art critic and cultural philosopher (b.1930).
- 7 June – Georges Pichard, French comics artist (b.1920).
- 13 June – Lajos Tscheligi, Hungarian painter (b.1913).

=== July to September ===
- 11 July - Dorothy Miller, 99, American curator (b.1904).
- 15 August – Kirk Varnedoe, American art historian, writer and curator (b.1946).
- 21 August – Wesley Willis, American artist and musician (b.1963).
- 29 August – Vladimír Vašíček, Czech painter (b.1919).
- 1 September – Terry Frost, English artist noted for his abstracts (b.1915).

=== October to December ===
- 3 October – William Steig, American cartoonist, sculptor and author (b.1907).
- 16 October – Avni Arbaş, Turkish artist (b.1919).
- 9 November – Mario Merz, Italian artist (b.1925).
- 4 December – David Vaughan, English psychedelic artist and muralist (b. 1944).
- 15 December – George Fisher, American political cartoonist (b.1923).
- 17 December – Wally Hedrick, American artist (b.1928).
