= Op. 140 =

In music, Op. 140 stands for Opus number 140. Compositions that are assigned this number include:

- Raff – Symphony No. 2
- Saint-Saëns – The Promised Land
- Schubert – Sonata in C major for piano four-hands, D 812 (Grand Duo)
- Schumann – "Vom Pagen und der Königstochter" for solo voice, chorus, and orchestra
- Shostakovich – Six Romances on Verses by English Poets
