= Les Dés Sont Jetés =

1960 tapestry by Le Corbusier

Les Dés Sont Jetés (The Dice Are Cast) is a tapestry by the Swiss-French artist Le Corbusier. It hangs in the Western Foyer of the Sydney Opera House and is 6.5 square meters in size.

== History ==
The tapestry was commissioned by the architect of the Sydney Opera House, Jørn Utzon, in 1958. Utzon had won the competition to design the opera house the previous year, and Utzon subsequently met Le Corbusier to discuss the tapestry in Paris in 1959. Utzon had written to Le Corbusier asking him to contribute "decoration, carpets and paintings" to the nascent opera house. The tapestry was woven in Aubusson in France and was completed in 1960. It was delivered to Utzon's residence in Hellebæk in Denmark, where it remained for 50 years after Utzon resigned from the project and until its eventual acquisition by the Sydney Opera House. It hung first in Utzon's dining room in Hellebæk and later hung in the workshop of Utzon's son, Jan. Lis, Utzon's wife, wrote to Le Corbusier to tell him that the tapestry was " ... a daily source of delight and beauty not only for ourselves and our children but for all our friends and guests, too. It has endowed our home with a beauty so exquisite that I am at a loss for the proper words". The Utzon family kept the tapestry in the wake of Jørn Utzon's resignation from the construction of Sydney Opera House.

It was bought by the Sydney Opera House at auction in 2015 for A$413,000.

The purchase of the tapestry was funded for the opera house by a group of donors led by the Australian fashion designer Peter Weiss. Following its acquisition it was hung under glass in the Western Foyers of the opera house and was unveiled there on 29 March 2016. The CEO of the Sydney Opera House, Louise Herron, said that in acquiring the tapestry it was " ... wonderful to be injecting such an extraordinary piece of the original DNA back into the Opera House ... Jørn Utzon always intended the interiors of his masterpiece to be filled with the work of the great artists of his day. This is a remarkable work and a remarkable insight into his original vision".

In 2003 Utzon created his own tapestry for the opera house, Homage to Carl Philipp Emanuel Bach, which now hangs in the Utzon Room at the opera house. In 2003 the architect Richard Johnson visited Utzon at his home with Grazyna Bleja of the Australian Tapestry Workshop to discuss Utzon's new tapestry and after he examined Le Corbusier's tapestry Utzon exclaimed "There! See that? Ours will be better!".

== Design ==
The tapestry predominantly features red, black and white. A sailboat is depicted and the tapestry is prominently signed by Le Corbusier in the top right corner. The architectural historian Antony Moulis of the University of Queensland believes that Bennelong Point is depicted on the tapestry in the bottom right hand corner, its centre the outline of the tram depot that was previously sited there.
