= Daniel Delamare =

French businessman (born May 17, 1958)

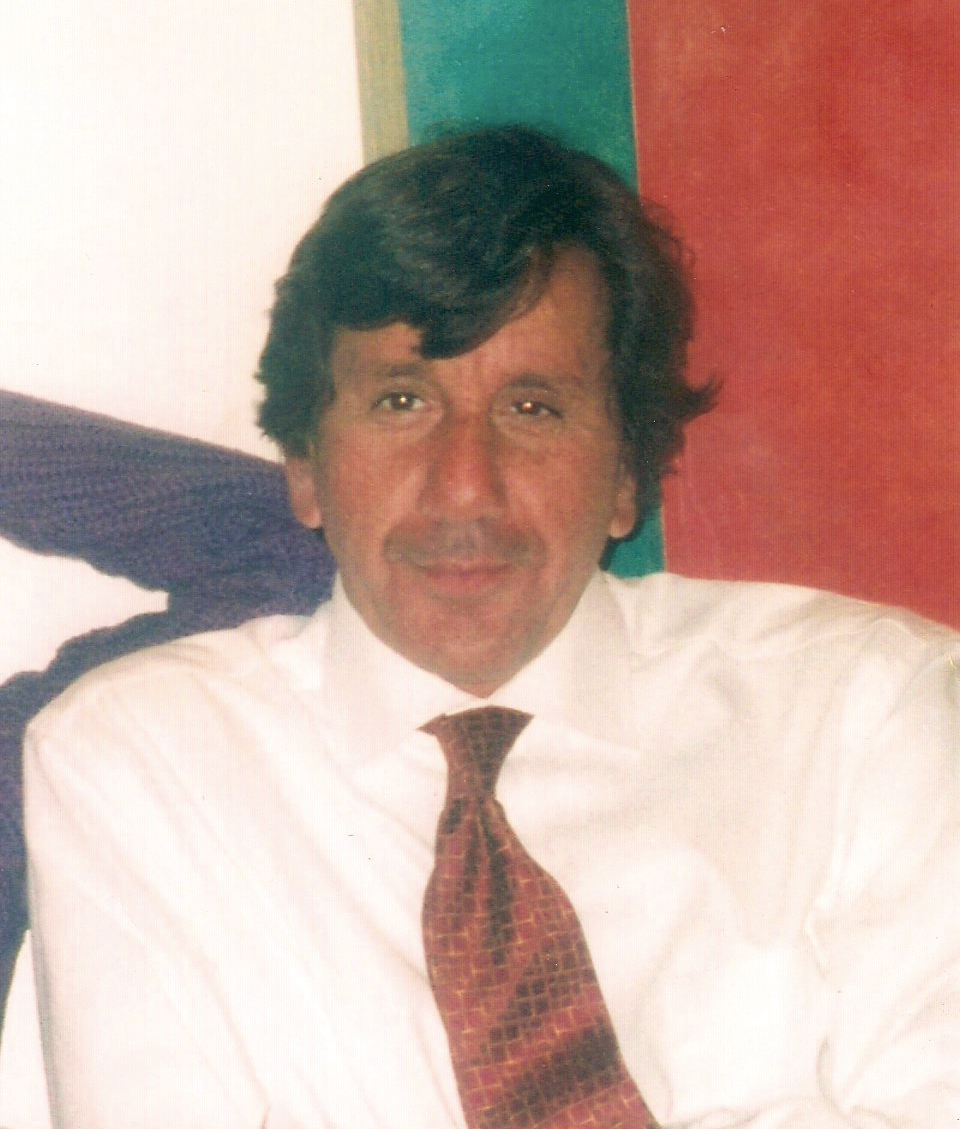
- Daniel Delamare
- Born: May 17, 1958 (age 68)
- Occupation: Businessman

Daniel Delamare (born May 17, 1958) is a French businessman who formerly owned an Art Gallery.

== Life and career ==
=== Early life ===
Orphaned as a child (pupille de la nation, brought up by the state), Daniel Delamare was raised at Fondation OPEJ - Baron Edmond de Rothschild. After spending three years at Lycée Charlemagne, he decided to study journalism in Paris.

=== Textile business ===
Delamare started his career in a Paris press agency before launching his own textile business in 1978. After being granted a license by The Walt Disney Company, Daniel Delamare created the Mickey Mouse polo shirts. He sold his company in 1985.

=== Art career ===
In 1987, he launched an art gallery on the Avenue Matignon in Paris that was later accused of art forgery. During the first years following the opening, "Gallery Daniel Delamare" mainly exhibited impressionist paintings. Delamare built personal collections of wealthy Asian and American businessmen. One of its main clients was Japanese businessman M.Okamura, former CEO of Taihei Sangyo K.K.

At M.Okamura's special request, Daniel Delamare started selling "genuine fakes" of famous painters including Amedeo Modigliani, Manet, Degas, Van Gogh, Gauguin, and Cézanne. Daniel Delamare and his partner, Danielle Van Santen, hired 15 painters and each of their copies was said to be unique. Each canvas had stamped on the back “Daniel Delamare - Copy”. Although these paintings were not originals, the gallery rewarded some painters’ descendants with royalties.

After a number of court cases and litigation brought again Daniel Delamare, the Criminal Division of the Court of Cassation ruled that there was nothing to prevent copyists of masterpieces from also copying the signature when the work had ‘fallen into the public domain’.

Western businessmen became interested in these paintings as well. Renowned buyers included Laurance Rockefeller and Baron Edmond de Rothschild.

In 1990, M.Okamura ordered 2,000 copies to create the "Daniel Delamare Museum" in order to exhibit exclusively forged copies in Japan. The press valued the transaction at 250 million francs, equivalent to €38 million.

=== Ironic cartoons ===
Before he sold his gallery in 1995, he exhibited humorous drawings from French cartoonists (Cabu, Georges Wolinski, Roger Testu, Pichon, Soulas, Hoviv, Siné, Trez, Loup). Delamare contributed in creating an art market for humorous drawings as these ones were, at the time, considered a "journalistic work".

In 1990, he co-published Traits d'Humour with François Cavanna to present pastiches of impressionists' masterpieces revisited by cartoonists. In 1992, he publishes Daniel Delamare présente 40 ans de Dessins d'Humour et de Presse, a new compilation of ironic cartoons.

First public auction for humoristic drawings was led by Maître Pierre Cornette de Saint Cyr at Hôtel Drouot in 1991.

=== Tech entrepreneur ===
In 2013, Daniel Delamare launched a digital platform, Politiclic, to help European Parliament candidates promote their electoral programs. He also founded Initiative Commune Connectee which provides city halls with mobile apps to make citizens and politicians closer. The company was sold to VINCI in 2017.

Daniel Delamare is now managing his own investment firm specialised in the art industry.

In 2020, Daniel Delamare launched art marketplace Artschild designed to allow artists to organize online auctions in real time. First exhibition happened in September 2020 within 2,500sqm.

== Books ==
- 1990: Traits d'Humour sur Toiles de Maîtres, Denoël ISBN 2-207-23791-5
- 1992: Daniel Delamare présente 40 ans de Dessins d'Humour et de Presse, Tiss Infos
