= Miklos Suba =

American painter

- Born: April 1, 1880; Szatmár, Hungary
- Died: July 18, 1944 (aged 64); New York City
- Education: Royal Hungarian Technical University, Academy of Fine Arts Vienna
- Known for: Painting, Architecture
- Movement: Precisionism

Miklos Suba (1 April 1880 – 18 July 1944) was a Hungarian-born American artist. Trained as an architect, he devoted his time to both architecture and art until 1940 when he dedicated the remainder of his life to painting subject matter in Brooklyn, New York. He is classified as a member of the precisionism movement.

== Biography ==
Miklos Suba was born in Szatmár, Hungary in 1880. He was educated in architecture at the Royal Hungarian Technical University of Budapest, graduating in 1902. He also studied painting at the Vienna Academy in 1903 and later traveled and painted throughout England, France, the Netherlands and Italy. He returned to Budapest to work as an architect over the next two decades. During this time he met and married his wife, May, an American pianist. The couple gave birth to their daughter, Susanne Suba, herself an artist and illustrator, in 1913. He immigrated to the United States from Hungary in 1924 and resided with his wife May and daughter at 142 Montague Street in the Brooklyn neighborhood of Brooklyn Heights. During this time he continued to devote time to both architecture and painting. He lived in Brooklyn Heights for the remainder of his life, later at 24 Sidney Place and finally at 69 Willow Street. With the exception of a single visit back to Hungary and a three-week stay in Chicago, he spent the rest of his life in Brooklyn. Suba died on 18 July 1944 after a brief illness. He is buried with his wife in Green-Wood Cemetery in Brooklyn.

== Career ==
During Suba's time in Budapest, he painted in a traditional central European style. However, Suba's adopted city impacted a major shift in painting style from countrysides and landscapes to industrial subject matter. The rendering of buildings with clean lines and exact detail caused him to be grouped with Precisionist artists. Suba's work depicts industrialization and modernization, rendered in precise, sharply defined geometrical forms. Of his work, Suba commented, "I try to express my realistic impressions without involking abstraction.... I am neither photographic nor reminiscent. Suba restricted his paintings and drawings to areas within Brooklyn, often within walking distance of his residence. As shown in his works, Suba had an intimate relationship with his Brooklyn; from its alleys and waterways to its storefronts and industrial plants, as well as its views of Manhattan. Occasionally, he departed from his routine subject matter to others that fascinated him: barber shops, barber's poles and cigar store Indians. Suba created scale models of barbershop poles from various locations in Brooklyn, and these models were featured in an exhibit of his work at the Brooklyn Museum in 1948. The Brooklyn Historical Society maintains a collection of twelve of Suba's scale-model barbershop poles, including working drawings and maps of the pole's locations. He incorporated barber poles in many of his paintings.

== Museum collections ==
- Ship's Funnels, 1932, The Metropolitan Museum of Art
- Study for Fences, 1938–1939, Museum of Fine Arts, Boston
- Atlantic Avenue, Brooklyn, c. 1939, Art Institute of Chicago
- Old Blacksmith, 1940 The Metropolitan Museum of Art
- Green Shutters, 1941 The Metropolitan Museum of Art
- Williamsburg, 1941, Brooklyn Museum
- God Bless Them, 1942, Museum of Fine Arts, Boston
- 33 Fulton Street Brooklyn 2, no date, Art Institute of Chicago

== Selected exhibitions (solo) ==
- Drawings by Miklos Suba, Art Institute of Chicago, 28 September 1944 to 15 January 1945
- Suba: First One-Man Exhibition of Paintings, The Downtown Gallery, 3 January 1945 to 21 January 1945
- Paintings by Miklos Suba, The de Young Museum, December 1947 to 17 January 1948
- Miklos Suba, Brooklyn Museum, 3 February 1948 through 7 March 1948
- Drawings by Miklos Suba: Old Buildings and Barber Poles of Brooklyn, Colorado Springs Fine Arts Center, 3 February 1948 to 7 March 1948
- Miklos Suba, Kalamazoo Institute of Arts, 7 March 1964 to 19 March 1964

== Selected exhibitions (group) ==
- The Brooklyn Society of Arts 26th Annual Exhibition, Brooklyn Museum, 27 March 1942 to 9 April 1942
- Artists for Victory, The Metropolitan Museum of Art, opened 07 Dec 1942
- The Brooklyn Society of Arts 27th Annual Exhibition, Brooklyn Museum, 22 January 1943 through 7 February 1943
- Realists and Magic Realists, The Museum of Modern Art, 10 February 1943 to 21 March 1943
  - Suba was represented by fifteen works in this exhibition. The exhibition toured nationally after its showing in New York
- The Artist in New York City, The Museum of the City of New York, 17 April 1958 to 1 December 1958

== Gallery ==
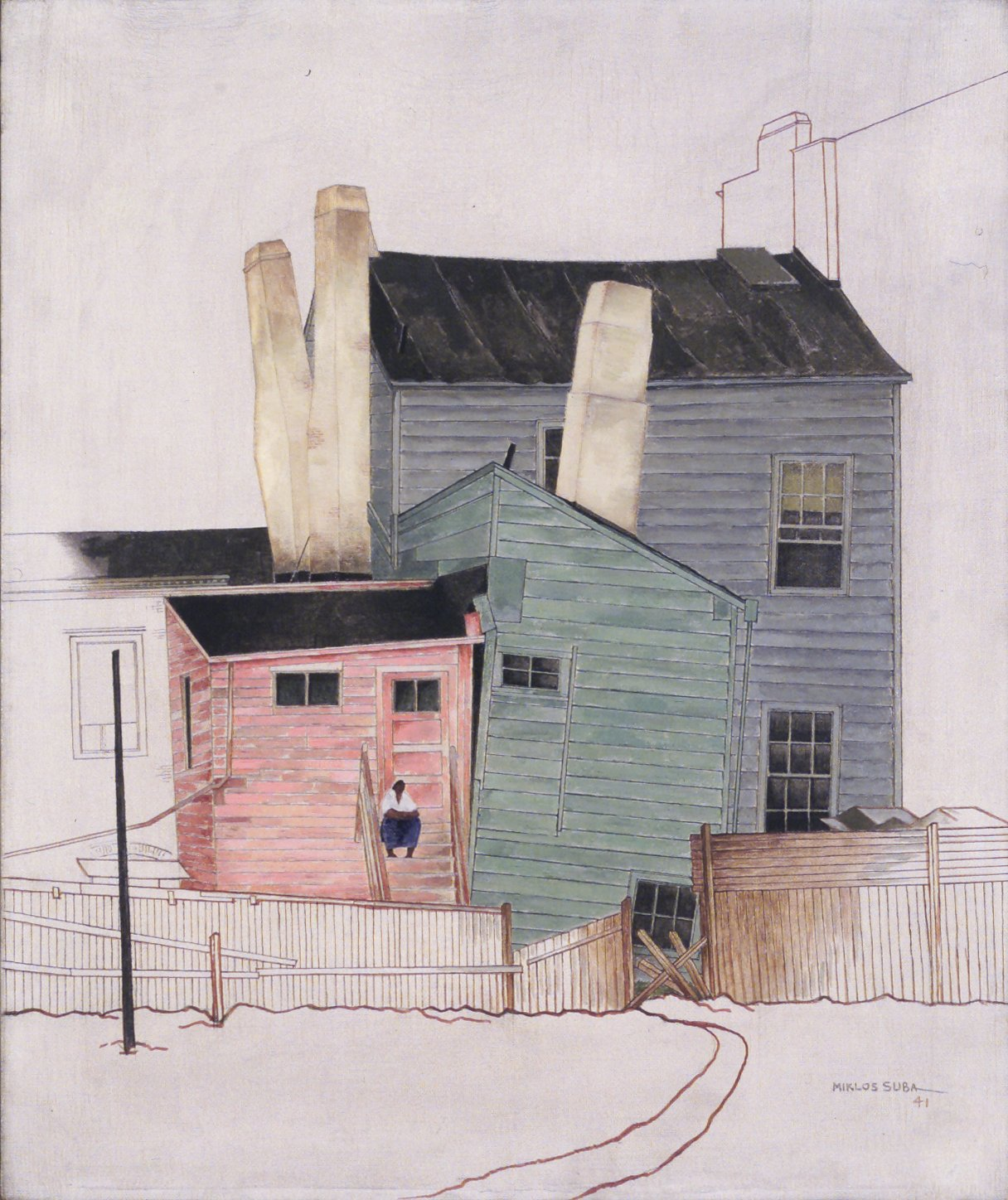
Painting of buildings in Williamsburg, Brooklyn, NY. 1941

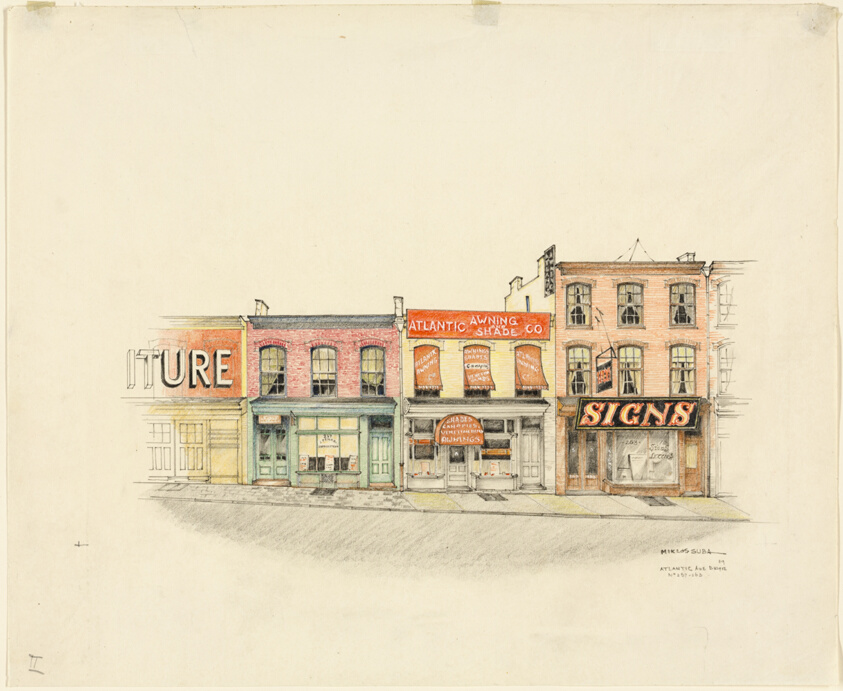
Atlantic Avenue Brooklyn, NY. c.1939

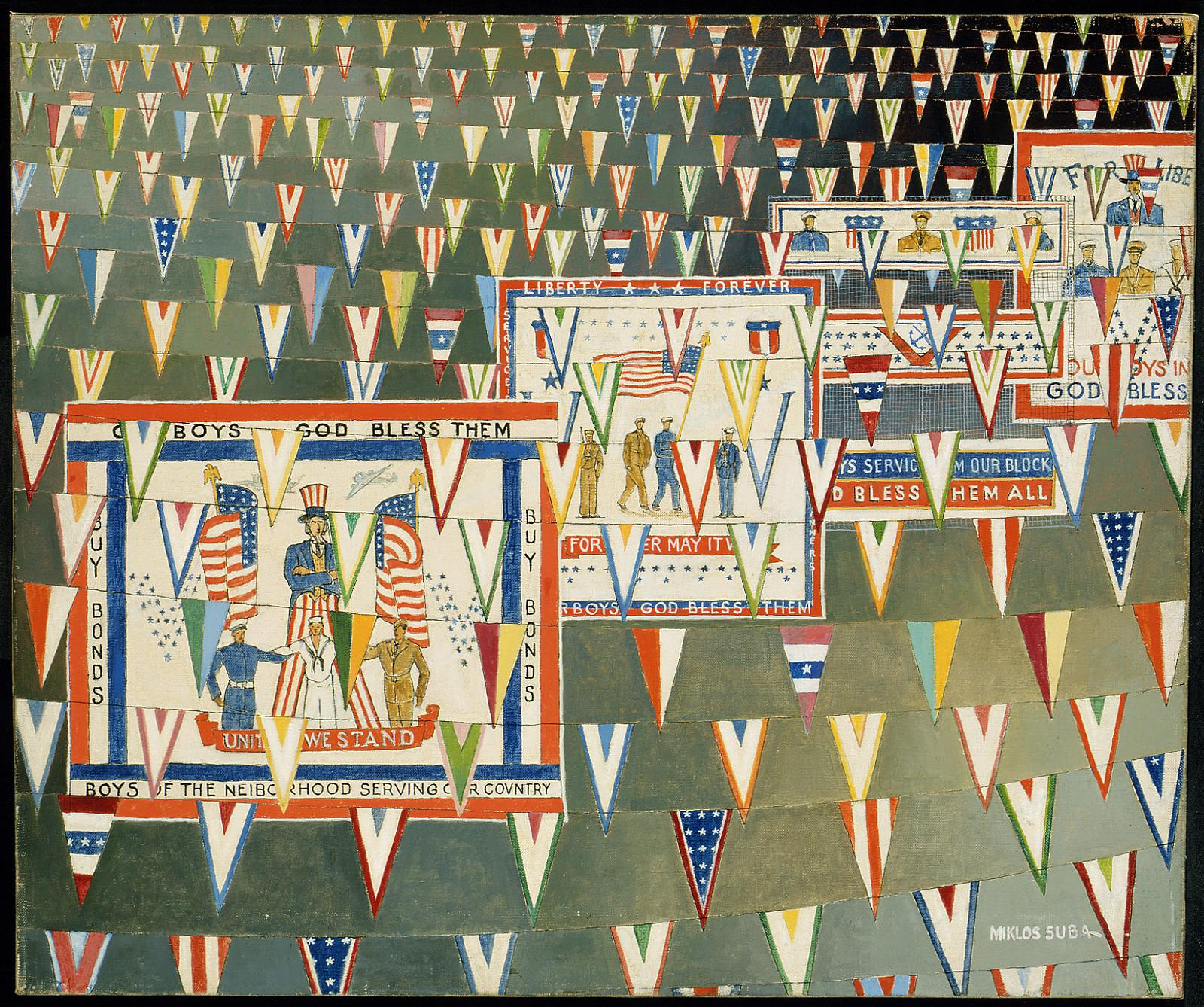
God Bless Them. 1942

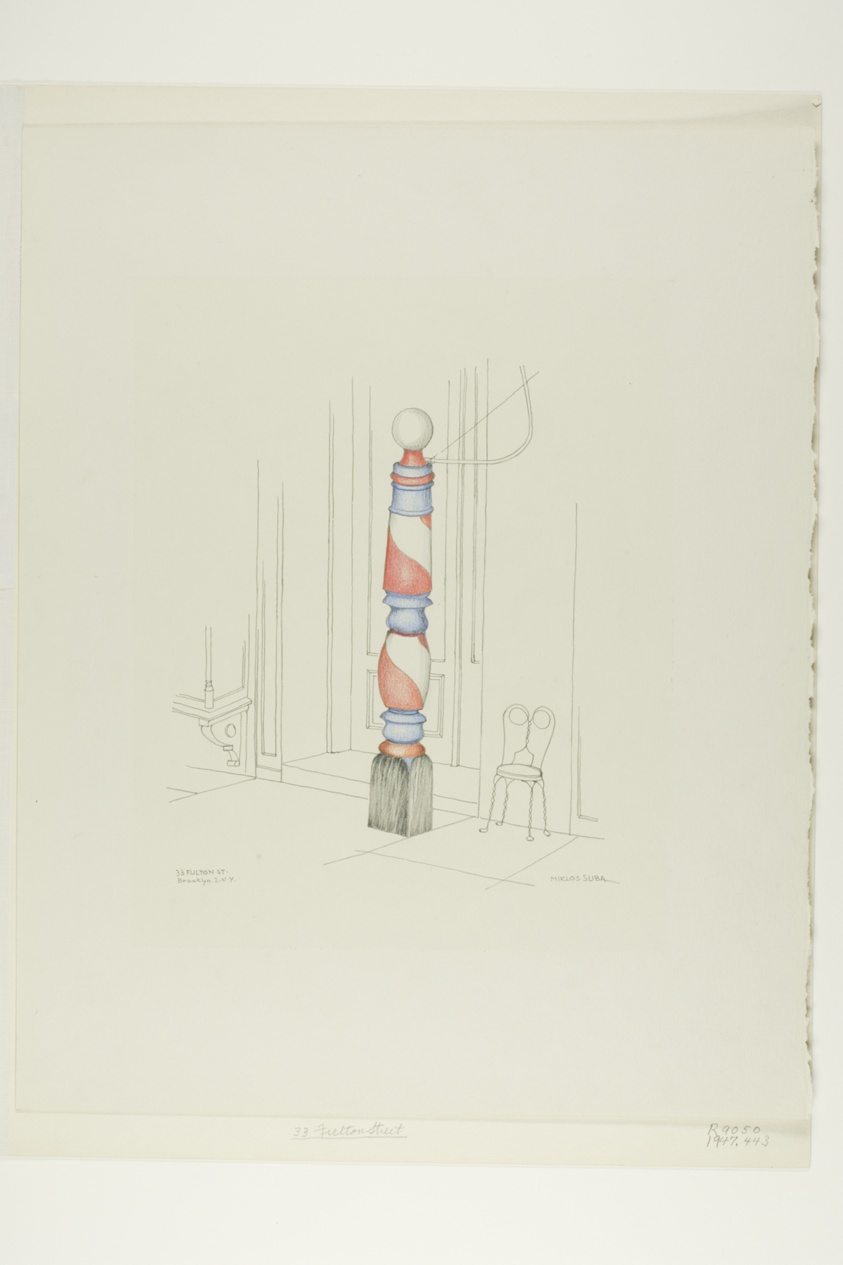
33 Fulton Street, Brooklyn, NY

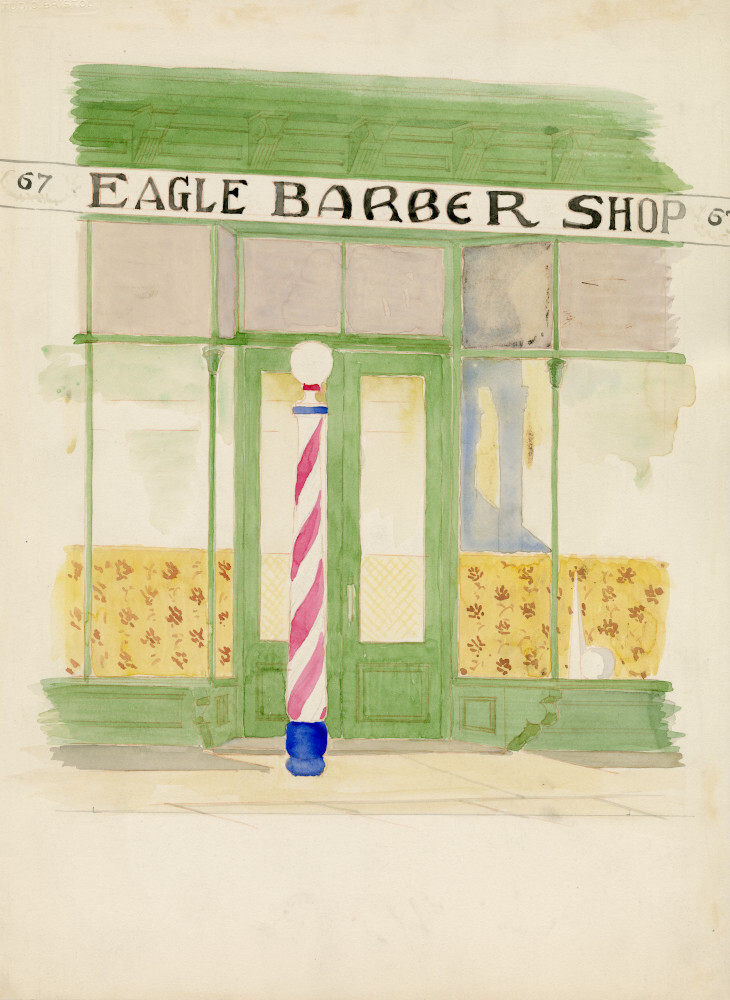
Study for Barber Pole, South 8th Street. c. 1941
