= Morning Yawn =

Painting by Edvard Munch

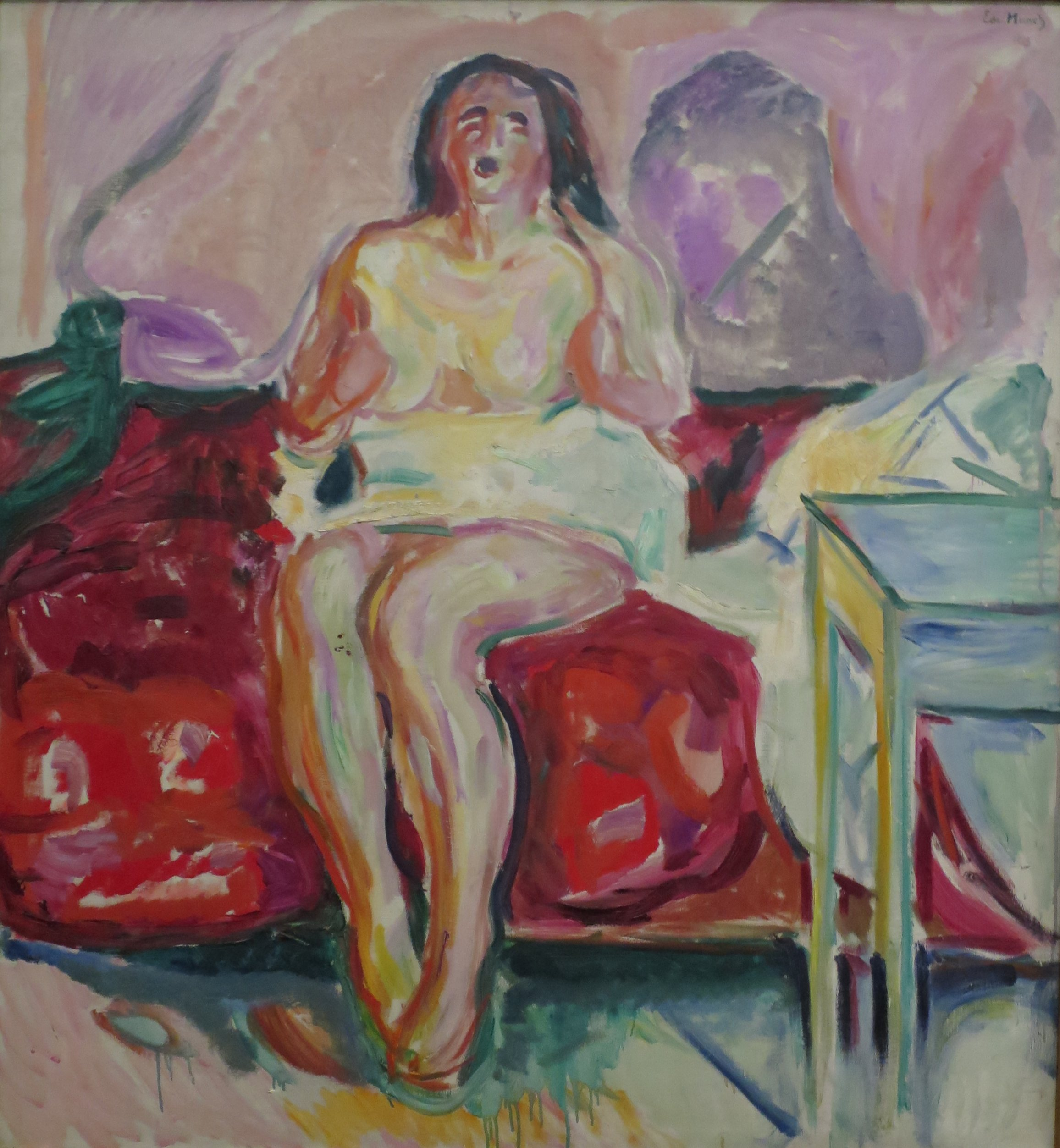
- Artist: Edvard Munch
- Year: 1913
- Medium: Oil on canvas
- Dimensions: 108 cm × 98 cm (43 in × 39 in)
- Location: Bergen Kunstmuseum, Bergen

Morning Yawn is an oil on canvas painting by the Norwegian artist Edvard Munch, from 1913. It is held at the Bergen Kunstmuseum, in Bergen.

== Detail ==
The painting shows a nude woman sitting on the edge of her bed and yawning. To the right is visible part of a table.

== See also ==
- List of paintings by Edvard Munch
- 1913 in art
