= Homage to Carl Philipp Emanuel Bach =

Australian tapestry

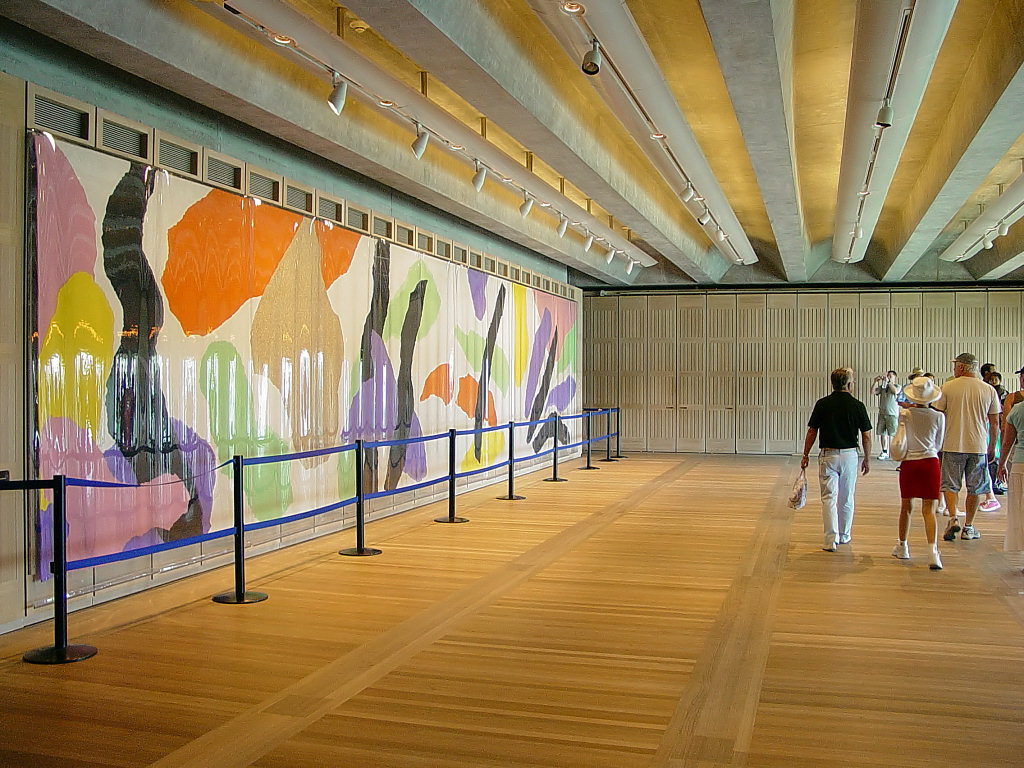
The tapestry in situ at the Utzon Room in 2007

Homage to Carl Philipp Emanuel Bach is a tapestry designed by the Danish architect Jørn Utzon. The tapestry was named by Utzon in honour of his favourite composer, Carl Philipp Emanuel Bach. It is 2.67 meters in height and 14.02 meters in length. It is made from wool and cotton.

== Location ==
Homage to Carl Philipp Emanuel Bach hangs in the Utzon room in the Sydney Opera House. The room was designed to host recitals of chamber music as well as lectures and social functions. The room is situated under the concrete vaults of the podium of the opera house. The tapestry enhances the acoustic qualities of the room by absorbing sound. The room is orientated east to west with a view of Sydney Harbour on the east acting as a backdrop to performances in the room with the tapestry on the west.

== History ==
Utzon won the competition to design a new opera house for Sydney in 1958 but resigned from the project in 1966. In 2000 he was hired to help oversee the redevelopment of the interior of the completed Sydney Opera House. The Reception Hall of the opera house was the first room to be redesigned under Utzon's guidance in 2000. It was subsequently renamed the Utzon Room.

Utzon had previously commissioned the architect Le Corbusier to design a tapestry, Les Dés Sont Jetés, for the opera house. Utzon kept Le Corbusier's tapestry after his resignation from the opera house project in 1966 and kept it at his home in Denmark. In 2003 Richard Johnson visited Utzon at his home with Grazyna Bleja of the Australian Tapestry Workshop to discuss his new tapestry and after Utzon examined Le Corbusier's tapestry he exclaimed "There! See that? Ours will be better!".

The tapestry was woven by Chris Cochius, Pamela Joyce, Milena Paplinska and Cheryl Thornton of the Australian Tapestry Workshop in 2003. It was woven on its side due to its extreme length.

== Design ==
The tapestry was inspired by Carl Philipp Emanuel Bach's Symphony No. 3 for Strings in C Major (Wq 182:3) of 1773. The gold in the tapestry represents the dominant violins in Bach's symphony. Utzon also found inspiration in Raphael's painting The Procession to Calvary, in the collection of the National Gallery in London originally designed for the Church of Santa Antonio in Perugia.

Utzon's design for the tapestry originated from a collage made from torn coloured strips of paper.

== Reception ==
The Australian Tapestry Workshop describes the tapestry as having "[glowing] with vibrancy and movement. The shapes tumble across the length of the work in an almost musical configuration: like a notation of syncopated acoustic elements forming point and counterpoint over the picture plane".

Writing in Architecture AU, the architect Richard Johnson describes the citing of the tapestry in the Utzon room as being " ... oriented to the harbour setting, a harmony of natural materials and details dominated by a singular work of art: a tapestry, to adjust the acoustics of the space and to add colour, texture, human scale and symbolic meaning".
