= Four Southern Poets Monument =

Monument in Augusta, Georgia, U.S.

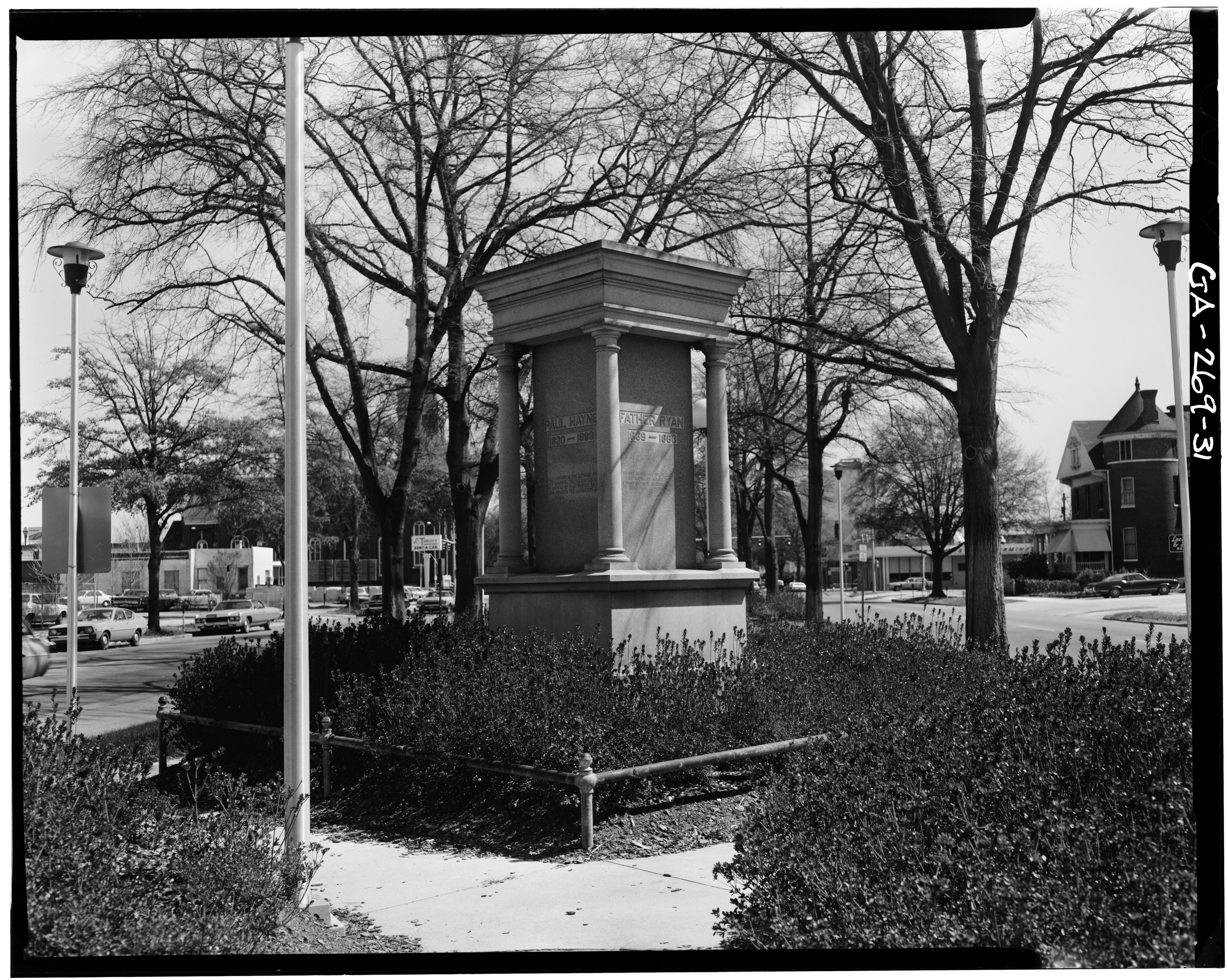
- Year: 1913
- Medium: Granite sculpture
- Location: Augusta, Georgia, United States
- 33°28′23.11″N 81°57′56.45″W

The Four Southern Poets Monument, also known as the Monument to Southern Poets and Poets' Monument, is a granite monument in Augusta, Georgia, in the United States.

== Description and history ==
The memorial was unveiled in April 1913 and commemorates Paul Hamilton Hayne (1830–1886), Sidney Lanier (1842–1881), James Ryder Randall (1839–1908), and Abram Joseph Ryan (1838–1886). All four poets lived in Georgia and loosely associated with the Confederate States of America.

The monument was donated by Anna Russell Cole, the wife of Confederate veteran and railroad executive Edmund William Cole of Nashville, Tennessee, "as a memorial to her father", Henry F. Russell, who was the first Democratic mayor of Augusta after the Civil War. According to The Tennessean, it was also meant as "a memorial to the men who have preserved the gallantry and chivalry of the Old South in the lyric sweetness of their songs."

The monument was made by the Tennessee Granite & Marble Company. Its dedication on April 28, 1913 was attended by a thousand people, including Mrs Cole, Augusta's mayor, and James Hampton Kirkland, the chancellor of Vanderbilt University, who gave a speech.

== See also ==
- 1913 in art
