= Marie Karsten =

Norwegian interior designer

- Born: 12 April 1872
- Died: 11 November 1953 (aged 81)
- Occupation: Interior designer

Marie Karsten (12 April 1872 –11 November 1953) was a Norwegian Interior designer. She specialized in furniture and textile design.

She was born in Christiania (now Oslo), Norway. She was the daughter of Hans Heinrich Karsten (1837–1909) and Ida Susanne Pfützenreuter (1846–1890). She was a sister of architect Heinrich Karsten (1873–1947), painter Ludvig Karsten (1876–1926) and textile artist Titti Karsten (1880–1963).

She studied at the Royal Arts and Crafts School (now Oslo National Academy of the Arts) under Herman Major Schirmer. She also studied at the Royal College of Art in London (1898–1900). She later conducted study trips to London, Paris, Rome, Florence and Venice during 1920.

Her best known public interior was probably the Iris tearoom of Tostrupgården at Karl Johans gate in Oslo from about 1905. She made several contributions to the 1914 Jubilee Exhibition. She is represented in the Norwegian Museum of Decorative Arts and Design.
