= Street, Berlin (Kirchner) =

1913 painting by Ernst Ludwig Kirchner

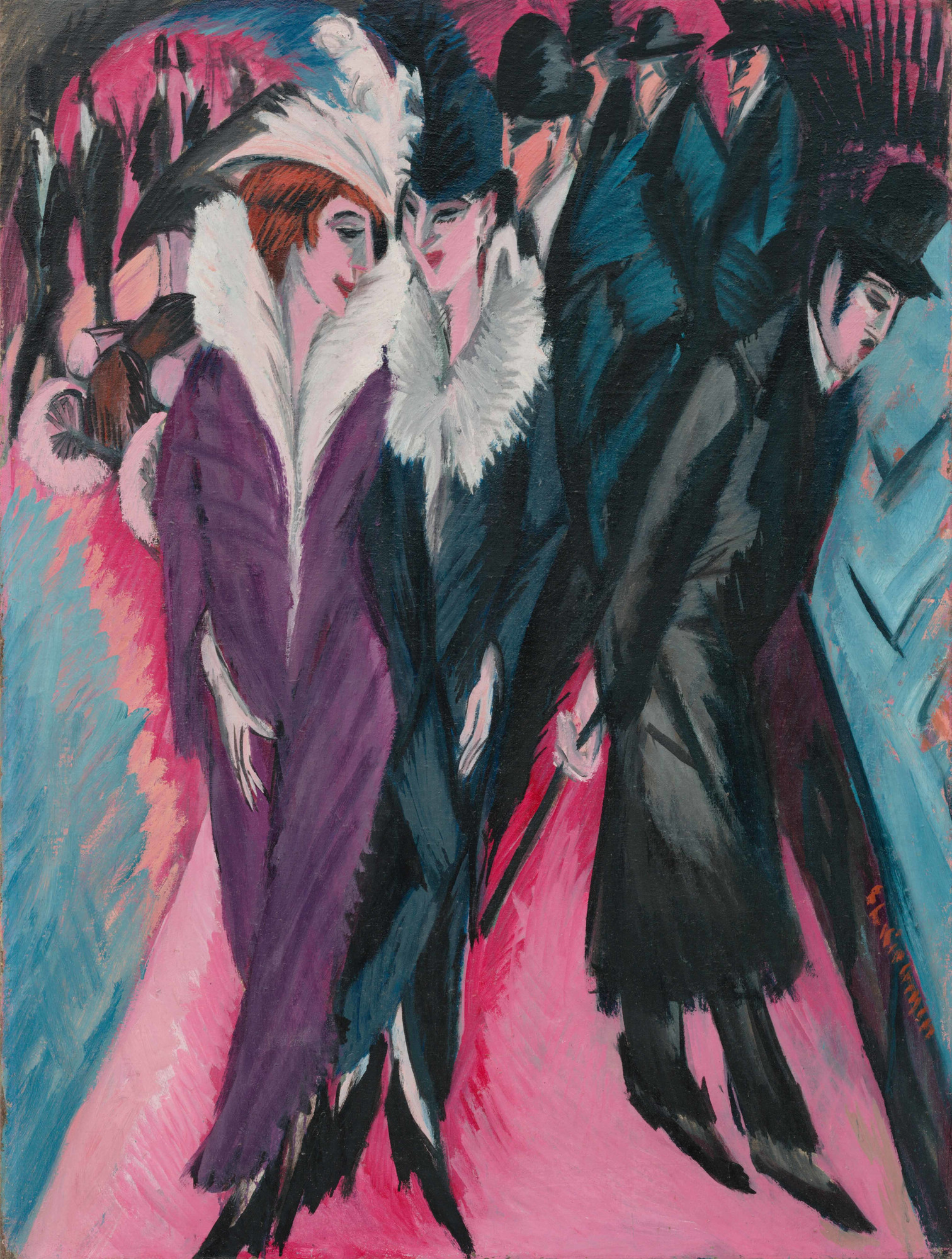
- Street, Berlin (1913)
- Artist: Ernst Ludwig Kirchner
- Year: 1913
- Medium: Oil on canvas
- Dimensions: 120.6 cm × 91.1 cm (47.5 in × 35.9 in)
- Location: Museum of Modern Art, New York

Street, Berlin is an oil painting by Ernst Ludwig Kirchner painted in 1913 before the outbreak of World War I. At this time, Kirchner painted several different street scenes that illustrated the chaos of city life and the relationship between men and women.

== Description ==
Street, Berlin depicts a busy street scene as men and women walk down the sidewalk. Two women in the central foreground are the focal point of the piece. The woman on the left wears a purple dress, a pop of color which contrasts with the mostly black clothing of the men that surround the pair. The men in the background form an undifferentiated mass; their clothes flow into one another and their non-distinct facial features cause the viewer to connect with the women because they are the only two with a sense of identity. Kirchner uses some anti-naturalistic color in this piece including the skin of the figures which varies between shades of pink and orange as well as the blue and pink shades in the scenery. The anti-naturalistic tones are common in German Expressionism and in his other work during this time period.

Kirchner's brushwork is loose and visible. The tilting downward of the perspective and the opposing diagonals in the brushwork create distortion and a sense of bustling motion. The viewer feels confronted with the people in the street, as if they about to spill off the canvas and into our space. Ideas of expression within German art carry all the way from Grünewald to Kandinsky, and Kirchner builds upon the idea of expressive brushwork and movement in his own pieces.

== Die Brücke and personal struggles ==
Kirchner had been a founding member of the German Expressionist painting group Die Brücke. The artists banded together in 1905 in Dresden and with the goal of promoting an avant-garde artistic style and saw themselves as an avant-garde group that bridged the gap between the classical past and their perception of art of the future. Die Brücke developed "a common style characterized by compositions of flat areas of unbroken colour, a radical simplification of form, and the use of glowing, unmixed colours applied with fluidity." The group sought to apply this stylistic approach to painting, printmaking, and architecture, though Kirchner focused almost solely on painting. Kirchner claimed to have artistic independence in the style of his work, but influence from earlier avant-garde movements is visible. The choice of bright and unnaturalistic colors resembles the work of Matisse during his Fauve period, which he also painted a number of figures like Kirchner does. Matisse was known throughout his career for painting female figures, a trend that Kirchner also adopts in his own work. Along with other members of the group, Kirchner moved to Berlin from Dresden in 1911. The move to Berlin proved to be troublesome for the group and rifts began to form. In 1913, several months before Kirchner painted Street, Berlin, the group formally dissolved due to artistic differences and disagreements about the direction of the group. Kirchner held a grandiose attitude to his own artwork and his attitudes toward showing outside the group context were major factors in the group's dissolution.
