= Ludvig Karsten =

Norwegian painter (1876–1926)

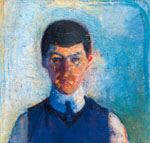
- Self portrait (1912)
- Born: 8 May 1876; Christiania, Norway
- Died: 19 October 1926 (aged 50); Paris, France
- Known for: Painting
- Notable work: The blue Kitchen
- Movement: Neo-impressionism

Ludvig Karsten (8 May 1876 – 19 October 1926) was a Norwegian painter. He was a neo-impressionist influenced by Edvard Munch, Henri Matisse and contemporary French painting. He first participated at the Autumn exhibition in Kristiania in 1901, and had his first separate exhibition in 1904. He is represented at museums in many Scandinavian cities, including several paintings at the National Gallery of Norway. Karsten was known for his bohemian lifestyle and quick temper.

== Personal life ==
Karsten was born in Christiana as the son of builder Hans Heinrich Karsten and Ida Susanne Pfützenreuter. He was a brother of designer Marie Karsten and architect Heinrich Joachim Sebastian Karsten. His daughter Alise was born in 1909 and raised in fosterage, until she later moved to Copenhagen to join her father and stepmother. In 1913 Karsten married the Danish sculptor Michaela (Misse) Frederikke Haslund (1886–1943). Their marriage dissolved in 1917. He died in Paris in 1926, after having fallen down a steep staircase.

== Career ==
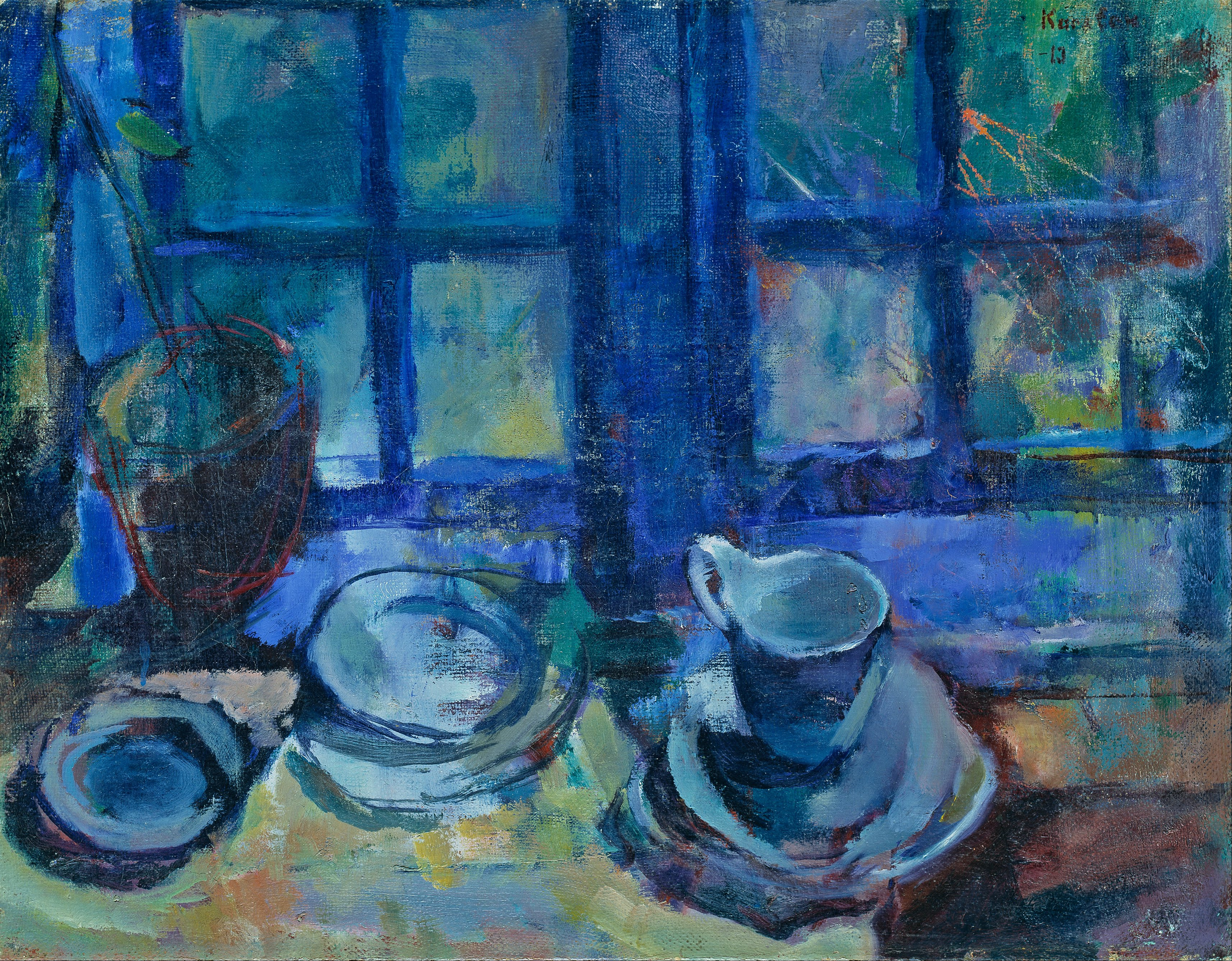
Ludvig Karsten – The Blue Kitchen

Karsten grew up in a wealthy home in Christiania (now Oslo). He started taking drawing lessons 13 years old. In 1893 he made a study tour to Telemark, where he made landscape sketches and portraits, and also joined painter Halfdan Egedius. After graduating from secondary school in 1895, he travelled to Rome, and later to Florence and Munich. In 1896 he travelled in Spain, and settled for a while in Madrid. He left Spain in 1898, and was enrolled in the Norwegian Armed Forces at Gardermoen for some months. He then travelled to Munich, where he painted En mann og en kvinne, also called Adam and Eve, which has later been located at the Stenersen Museum. He visited Paris in autumn 1900, where he trained on models. In 1901 he was in Åsgårdstrand, where he painted Two Men and Three Boys, which were both shown at his first appearance at the Autumn exhibition in Kristiania in 1901. Karsten returned to Paris, where he spent several years. He was known for his boozing and temperament. After a fight with the poet Nils Collett Vogt he was temporarily expelled from the circle of Norwegian artists residing in Paris. He visited the museum Louvre, where he paraphrased Ribera's painting of the burial of Christ. The painting was bought by Frits Thaulow, and came to be Karsten's the first important sale. It was resold to the National Gallery in Oslo in 1909, after Thaulow's death.

Karsten's first separate exhibition, at Blomqvist in Kristiania in September and October 1904, received mixed critic in the newspapers. In 1905 he visited Edvard Munch at Åsgårdstrand, where Munch made a large portrait of him. After a night of heavy drinking, possibly on Midsummer Eve, it came to quarrel which led to a violent fight between Munch and Karsten. Munch later made an etching of his version of the incident. From 1910 Karsten lived mostly in Copenhagen, where he married in 1913. In 1920, he bought a house in Skagen where he began painting large landscapes in his pointillé style, attracted by the bright local light.

Karsten is represented at the National Gallery of Norway with several paintings, including Kristi gravleggelse from 1904, Vårkveld i Ula from 1905, Tæring from 1907, Det blå kjøkken (English: The blue Kitchen) from 1913, Det røde kjøkken (English: The red Kitchen) from 1913, and Flukten fra Egypt from 1922. He is represented at the Bergen Museum (with Søsken, and Batseba), at Nationalmuseum in Stockholm (with the painting Den lyse og mørke akt), at Statens Museum for Kunst in Copenhagen (with Golgata from 1923), and at the Stenersen Museum in Oslo (with the paintings Adam og Eva and Gobelin). Karsten was also well known for his paraphrases of works by elder painters, including 16th-century artist Jacopo Bassano and 17th-century artists Jusepe de Ribera and Rembrandt. His last painting was a portrait of his daughter Alise, when she visited him in Paris in 1926.

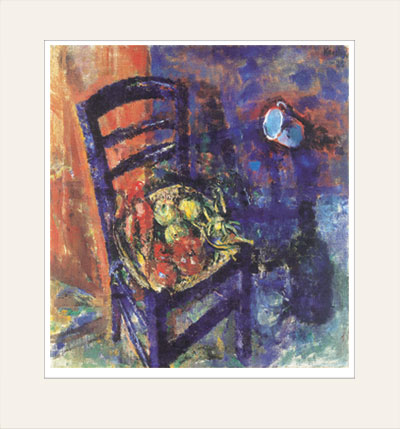
Blå stol (Blue chair)

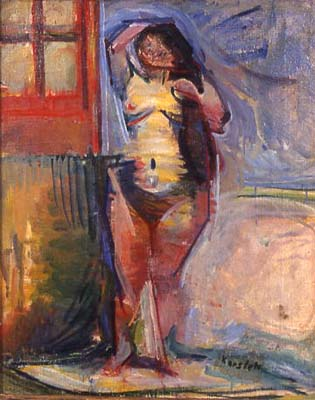
Standing nude (1910)

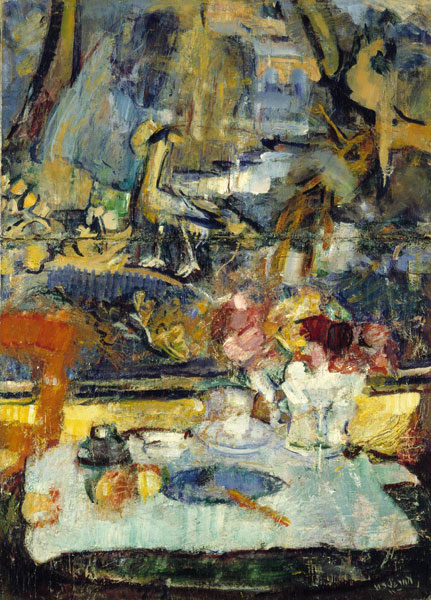
Gobelin 1911

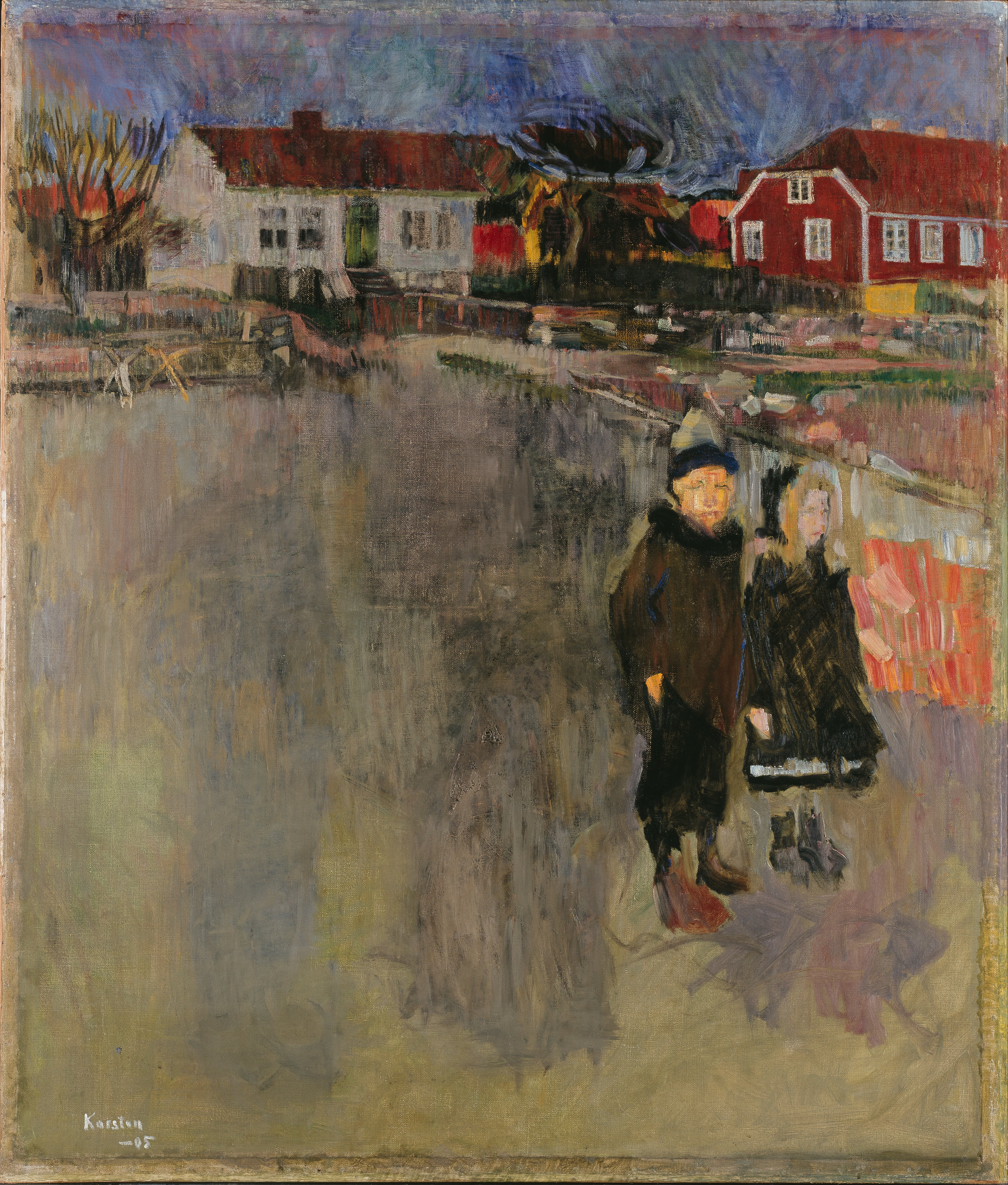
Spring Evening at Ula

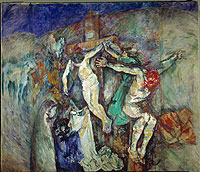
Deposition (1925)

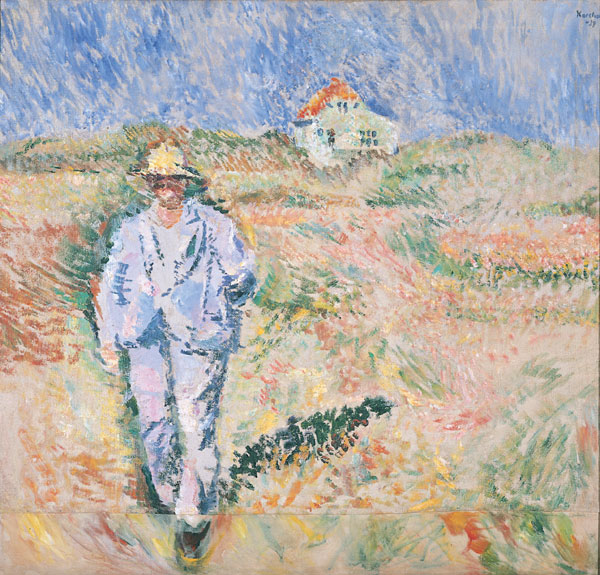
White-Suited Man in Skagen Landscape (1924)
