= Mountain with Red House =

Painting by Charles Demuth

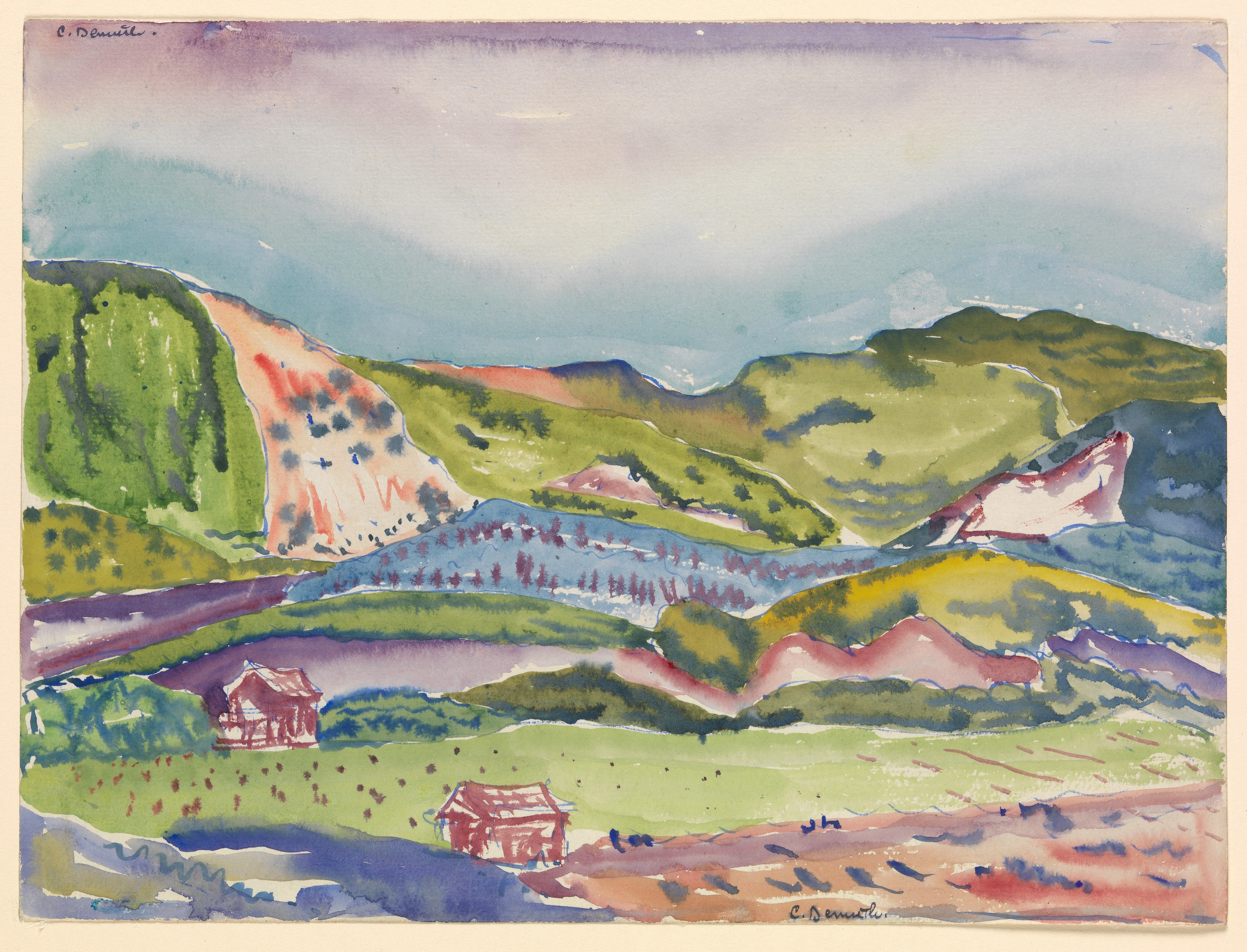
- Artist: Charles Demuth
- Year: c. 1913
- Dimensions: 24.1 cm (9.5 in) × 32.1 cm (12.6 in)
- Location: Metropolitan Museum of Art
- Accession no.: 49.70.70a, b
- Identifiers: The Met object ID: 488517

Mountain with Red House is a watercolor landscape painting created ca. 1913 by the American artist Charles Demuth. It is in the collection of the Metropolitan Museum of Art, in the New York.

== Early history and creation ==
Charles Demuth painted this work around 1913, perhaps while he developed his craft in Paris traveled across France. He likely held onto this painting until he gave it to his friend Georgia O'Keeffe in 1931.

== Description and interpretation ==
The work depicts two small houses in the foreground with a mountain range in the background. On the reverse side, there is a watercolor draft of a bridge over the Seine in Paris.
