= Violin and Playing Cards on a Table =

1913 painting by Juan Gris

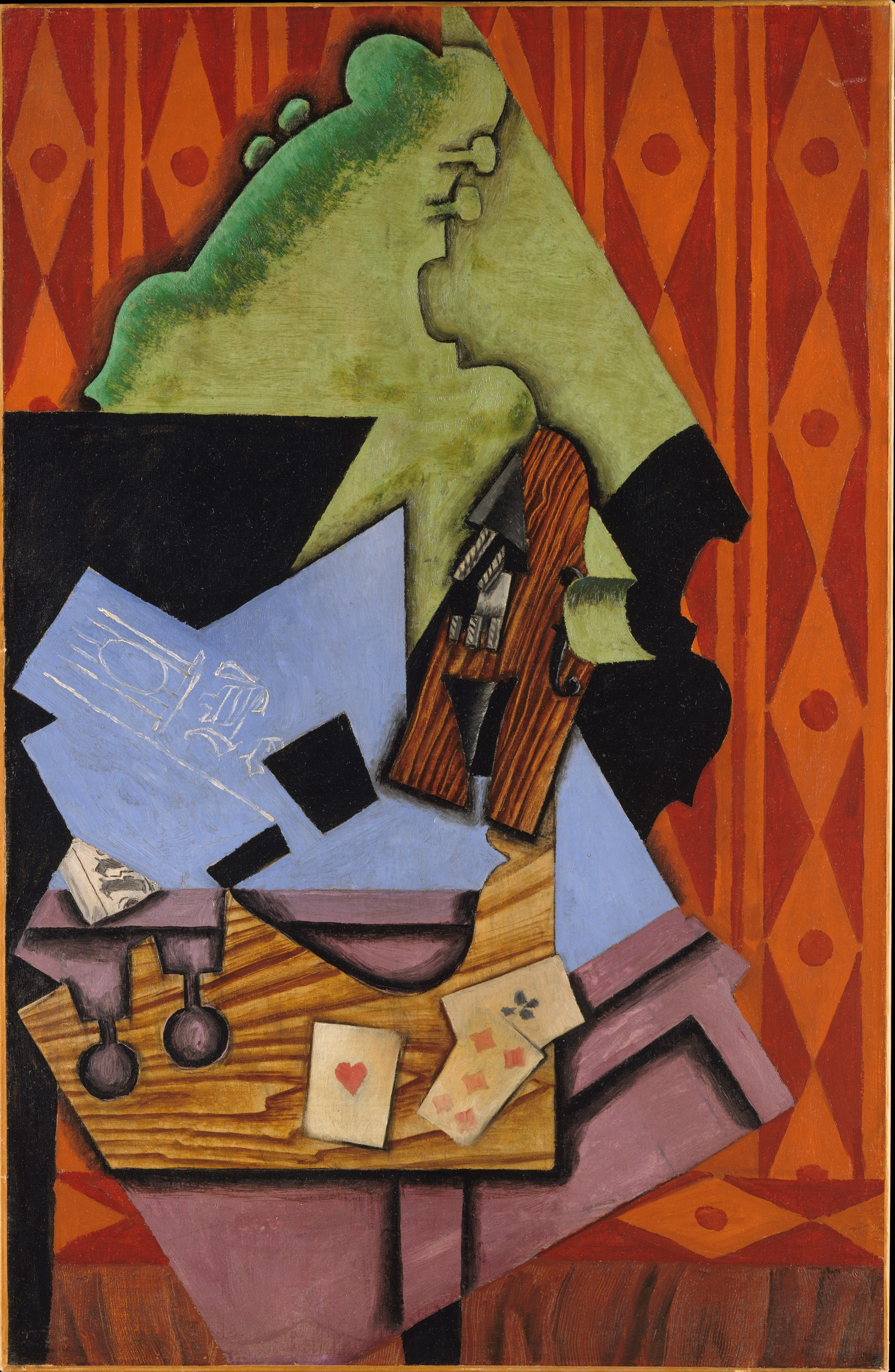
- Artist: Juan Gris
- Year: 1913
- Medium: Oil on canvas
- Dimensions: 100.3 cm × 65.4 cm (39.5 in × 25.7 in)
- Location: Metropolitan Museum of Art; New York
- Accession: 1996.403.14

Violin and Playing Cards on a Table is an oil on canvas painting by Spanish cubist Juan Gris, from 1913. The work is a still life, a typical motif for the cubists. It is in the collection of the Metropolitan Museum of Art, in New York.
