= Portrait of Auguste Rodin =

Painting by John Lavery

- Artist: John Lavery
- Year: 1913
- Type: Oil on canvas, portrait painting
- Dimensions: 152.4 cm × 101.9 cm (60.0 in × 40.1 in)
- Location: Victoria and Albert Museum, London

Portrait of Auguste Rodin is a 1913 portrait painting by the Irish artist John Lavery. It depicts the French sculptor Auguste Rodin in his seventies. Rodin was acclaimed for his pioneering role in developing modern sculpture. It has been described as a "definitive portrait of Rodin"

The two men worked closely International Society based in London of which Rodin succeeded James McNeill Whistler as president.

In November 1914 following the outbreak of the First World War Rodin donated eighten sculptures to the Victoria and Albert Museum in South Kensington in honour of British and French soldiers killed during the fighting. Lavery presented this work, which he had produced in London the previous year, at the same time. He intended to reciprocate Rodin's gesture by having British art honour the Frenchman.

== Bibliography ==
- Grunfield, Frederic V. Rodin: A Biography. Da Capo Press, 1998.
- McConkey, Kenneth. Sir John Lavery. Canongate Press, 1993.
