= Still Life with a Guitar =

1913 painting by Juan Gris

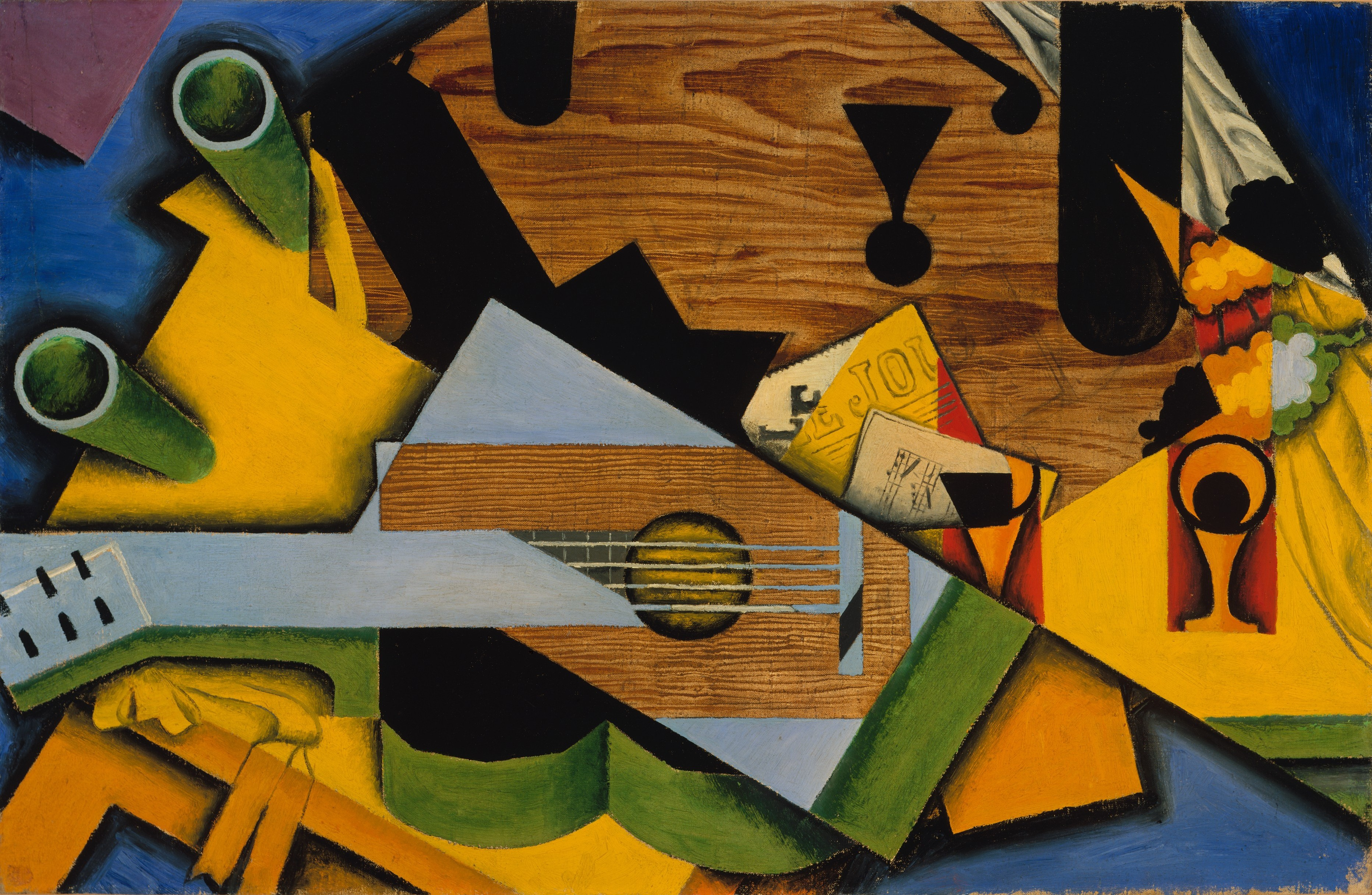
- Artist: Juan Gris
- Year: 1913
- Medium: Oil on canvas
- Dimensions: 66 cm × 100.3 cm (26 in × 39.5 in)
- Location: Metropolitan Museum of Art; New York
- Accession: 1999.363.28

Still Life with a Guitar is an oil on canvas painting by Spanish cubist Juan Gris, from 1913. The work is in the collection of the Metropolitan Museum of Art, in New York, Gallery 905.

The work was created in the small French town of Céret in the Pyrenees. Céret was popular with artists, including Picasso, who paid a visit there in the same year.
