= The Blue Kitchen =

1913 painting by Ludvig Karsten

- Det blå kjøkken (Norwegian)
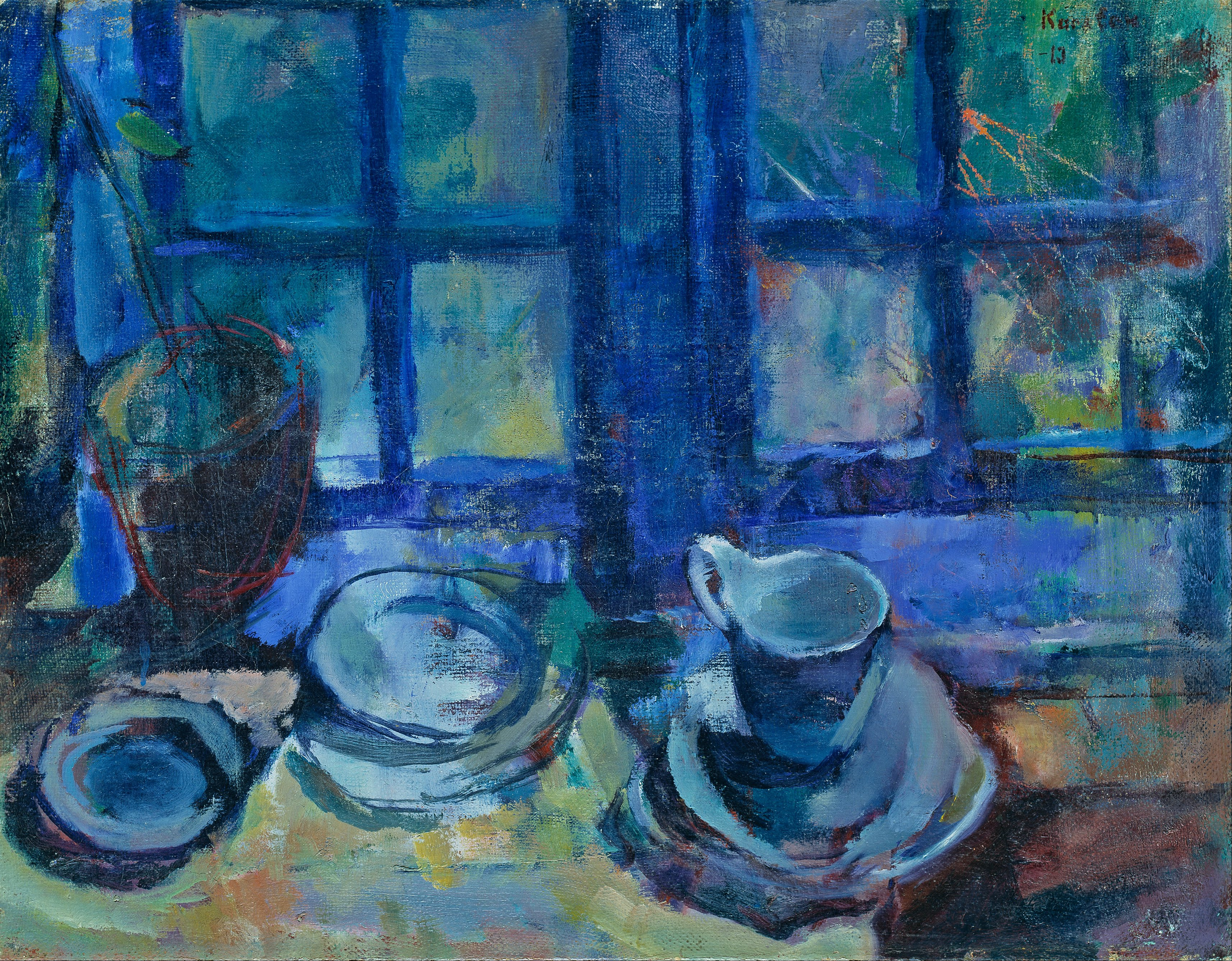
- Artist: Ludvig Karsten
- Year: 1913
- Medium: Oil, on canvas
- Dimensions: 54 cm × 69 cm (21 in × 27 in)
- Location: National Gallery, Oslo

The Blue Kitchen (Norwegian: Det blå kjøkken; dated 1913) is the title of a neo-impressionist painting by Norwegian artist Ludvig Karsten, showing a kitchen table ready for breakfast, while the morning sun is shining through the window.

The Blue Kitchen is regarded among Karsten's most important paintings. It is located at the National Gallery in Oslo.

In 1913 Karsten was newly married, and the couple moved from Copenhagen to the Norwegian island Hvasser. Sources differ whether Blue Kitchen is painted in Copenhagen or Hvasser. The painting was bought by art collector Christian Tetzen-Lund in 1913. In his notebook he called it Det blaa Vindue, and he had paid a price of 125 kr. The blue Kitchen was first publicly exhibited at The Autumn Exhibition in Kristiania in 1913, and also at an exhibition in Copenhagen later the same year. The National Gallery acquired the painting after offering a price of 800 kr.

== Related works ==
An earlier rejected study by Karsten, Oppstilling ved vindu is located on the back side of his painting Pløyemark from 1909. Karsten's painting From my blue Kitchen from 1913, where his wife Misse is modelled standing in their kitchen, was exhibited in Kristiania from March to April 1913, and is currently located at Statens Museum for Kunst in Copenhagen. At the 1913 Autumn Exhibition in Kristiania Karsten also exhibited another still painting, The red Kitchen, which has later (in 1926) been acquired by the National Gallery in Oslo. Karsten's painting Atelierinteriør (English: Studio interior) from 1926 (lost in a fire during World War II) had The blue Kitchen hanging on the painted wall.
