= Pierre Probst =

French illustrator

Pierre Probst (December 6, 1913 - April 12, 2007) was a French children's book writer and illustrator. He was known for his creation of the Caroline character, a heroine for children books.

== Biography ==
Probst was born in Mulhouse, then part of Germany, to a family that manufactured printed fabrics. Deciding at a young age to become an artist, he studied at the École des Beaux-Arts. He moved to Lyon in the 1930s and did many jobs related to drawing, painting and photo-editing.

During World War II, he served in the French Army. Captured by Germans, Probst told them he wished to return to civilian life in Mulhouse. Once released, he escaped and returned to Lyon and Paris. He worked for Hachette in Paris, first drawing animal stories for children, such as those featuring Chippy the cocker-spaniel. In 1953, he created Caroline, based on his tomboyish daughter Simone. He died in Suresnes in 2007, aged 93.

== Caroline ==
Since the creation of the series in 1953, 43 albums of Caroline were created and 38 million copies of those albums were sold.'Caroline' is about seven years old, and has blonde hair with pigtails. She lives by herself among a band of friends - the dogs Bobby and Rusty, the cats Puff and Inky, the bear Bruno, a lion and a panther.
