= Gyula Juhász (sculptor) =

Hungarian sculptor and medallist

- Born: 13 April 1876; Eger
- Died: 6 January 1913 (aged 36); Újpest, Budapest
- Occupation: sculptor

Juhász Gyula (13 April 1876 – 6 January 1913) was a Hungarian sculptor and medallist.

Juhász was born in Eger, in northern Hungary. He was studying at Iparrajziskola (Technical School of Design) from 1891 to 1893, then started to work in a workshop as architectural sculpture assistant. In the second half of the decade he was visiting engraving courses by Ferenc Vasadi. Due to his talent he shortly attracted the attention of Ede Telcs, renown medalist of the epoch. As from 1901 he attended Telcs' workgroup to learn more about designing medals. Awarded fellowship of the National Art Board (Országos Képzőművészeti Tanács) he was studying medal art at the Academy of Fine Arts Vienna as follower of Edmund von Hellmer Austrian sculptor. As from 1906 he came out with personnel exhibitions (mostly in the Palace of Arts). After returning to Budapest he continued to work for Telcs, then in 1911 he did a field trip to Florence. Shortly he moved to the recently opened Százados Street Estate of artists, where he owned studio.

His statues (Eva, 1909; Gladiator), medals and plaquettes (Meat Industry Fair, 1907; Dezső Szilágyi, 1908; Exhibition on Accident Prevention, 1910) are fitting to the moderate trend of the Hungarian Art Nouveau. Juhász died on 6 January 1913 in Újpest, a district of Budapest.
