= Portrait of Erna Schilling =

Painting by Ernst Ludwig Kirchner

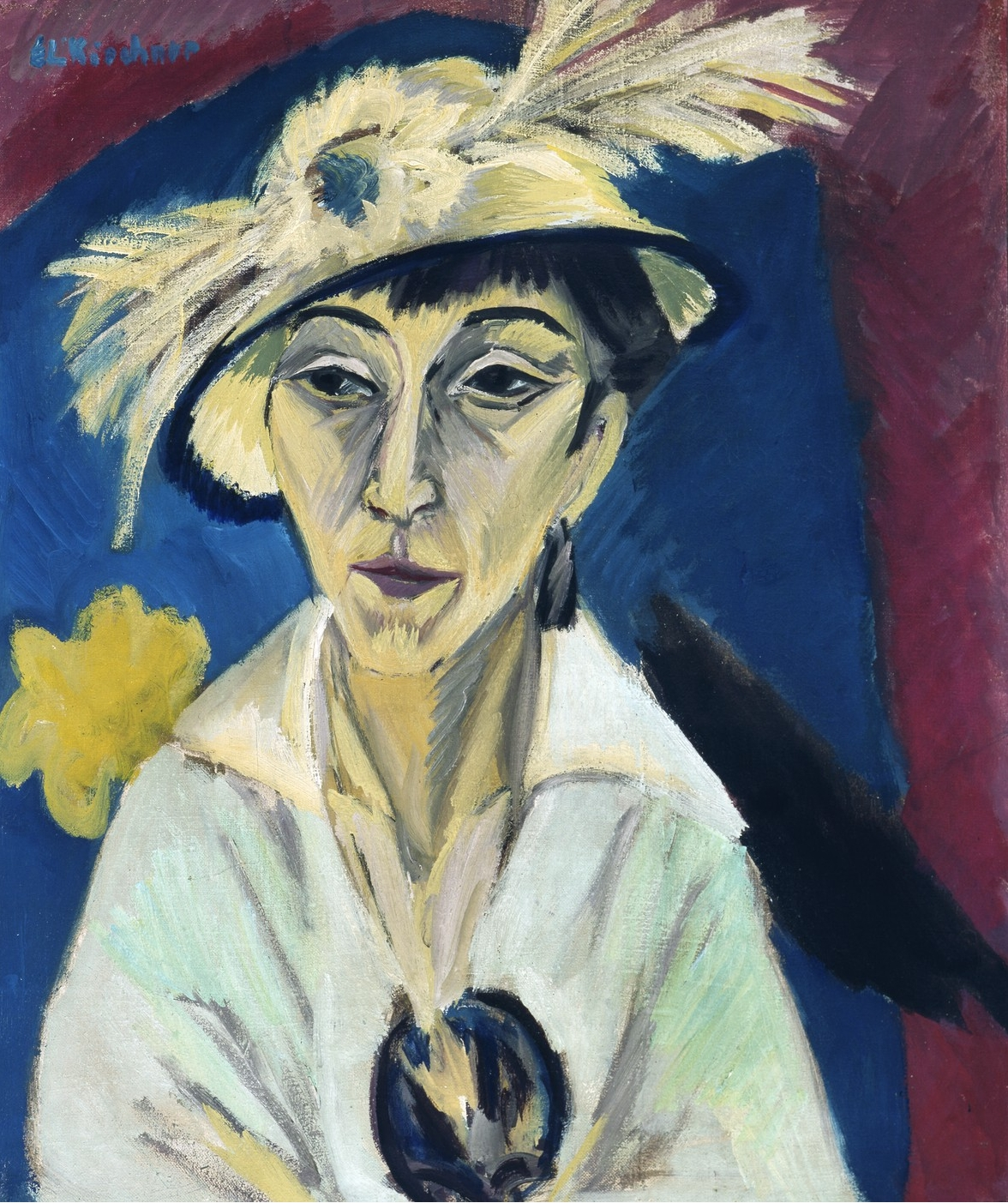
- Artist: Ernst Ludwig Kirchner
- Year: 1913
- Medium: Oil on canvas
- Dimensions: 71.5 cm × 60.5 cm (28.1 in × 23.8 in)
- Location: National Gallery, Berlin

Portrait of Erna Schilling, also known as Sick Woman or Woman with an Hat, is an oil-on-canvas painting executed in 1913 by the German Expressionist artist Ernst Ludwig Kirchner. It depicts the nightclub dancer Erna Schilling, from Berlin, who after Kirchner's move from Dresden to Berlin in 1911, became his friend and model, and later, common-law wife. The portrait shows Kirchner's signature on the top left: EL Kirchner. It has been in the collection of the National Gallery, in Berlin, since 1989.

== History and description ==
After moving from Dresden to Berlin in October 1911, Kirchner met the dancer Erna Schilling and her sister Gerda in a Berlin nightclub. He became her friend and she became his model. It was a relationship of equals that lasted until Kirchner's suicide in 1938 in Davos, Switzerland. In 1913, Erna felt ill and had a melancholy, irritable mood, which Kirchner depicted artistically in this portrait.

For Kirchner, the condition of an indisposed but elegantly dressed city dweller was an inspiring motif, as it gave him the opportunity to try out a new kind of brushstroke in his painting, one that was pointed, angular and nervous in its style, reflecting the situation of the tense city. Erna's elegant clothing, her skeptical facial expression and the associated subtle color, stand in contrast with the brightly colored background.

The painting marks the beginning of a new artistic phase for Kirchner, since it shows for the first time the mature style of his later big-city depictions.

Erna and her sister Gerda Schilling were also models for his Berlin main work Potsdamer Platz from 1914.

== Provenance ==
The portrait came to the industrialist and art collector Carl Hagemann collection in 1916. Hagemann was a friend of the artist who, in return for monthly financial support for Kirchner, was allowed to choose a painting from his studio on a regular basis. Hidden in the Frankfurt Städel with the entire Hagemann collection, the work survived the Nazi era. From his estate it came to the collector Karlheinz Gabler, in Frankfurt am Main, in 1949. After Gabler's death, it was on a permanent loan to the Museumslandschaft Hessen Kassel, in Kassel, since 1986. In 1989, the Association of Friends of the Berlin National Gallery bought it from Gabler's estate administrator, Wolfgang Gabler. It has been in the museum's collection since then.
