= Susanne Suba =

Hungarian-American artist

- Born: Zsuzsanna Suba; December 13, 1913; Budapest
- Died: February 4, 2012 (aged 98)
- Occupation: Illustrator, writer, watercolorist
- Parent(s): Miklos Suba

Susanne Suba (1913–2012) was a Hungarian-born watercolorist and illustrator, active in the United States.

== Early life ==
Suba was born Zsuzsanna Suba in Budapest, Hungary, on December 13, 1913, to May Edwards Suba, a pianist of Brooklyn, New York and Miklos Suba, an architect and artist. She drew from an early age, sitting beside her father as he worked.

Some time in the early 1920s her family emigrated and settled in Brooklyn, New York; her father arrived in 1924, but her drawings show Suba herself was already there in 1922.

She was educated at Brooklyn Friends School and the Pratt Institute.

== Career ==
She worked as a freelance illustrator and commercial artist. As such, she painted covers and spot illustrations for The New Yorker from the 1930s onwards. A collection of these were published as Spots by Suba in 1944.

She illustrated books, including an edition Henry David Thoreau’s Life Without Principle (her first book illustration), and over 25 children's books, some by her husband. She also wrote and illustrated books in her own name.

She had exhibitions at the Museum of Fine Arts, Boston, Art Directors Club of New York and the Chicago equivalent, the Museum of Modern Art New York, Brooklyn Museum and several others.

== Personal life ==
Suba married Russell McCracken, a writer and editor. They lived in Chicago.

She died on February 4, 2012, aged 98.

== Legacy ==
Suba's papers for the years 1939–1993 are held by the Smithsonian Institution's Archives of American Art. Additional papers, covering 1972–1976, are in the de Grummond Children's Literature Collection at the University of Southern Mississippi.

The Eric Carle Museum of Picture Book Art has almost 600 of her works, which she bequeathed to the museum. Her pen and ink drawing Woman Reading (circa 1940–1964) is held by the Art Institute of Chicago.
