= Udnie =

1913 painting by Francis Picabia

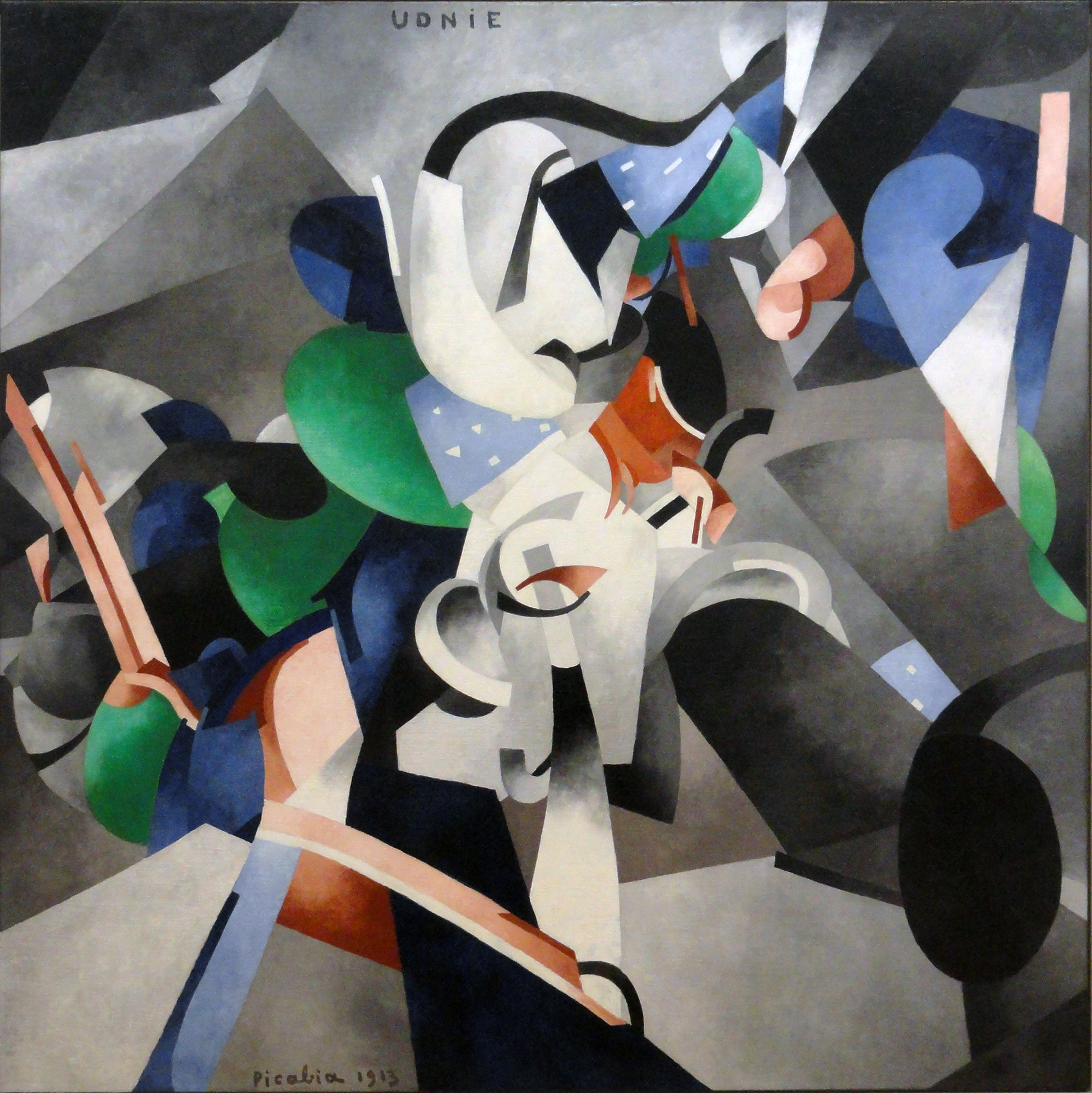
- Artist: Francis Picabia
- Year: 1913
- Medium: oil on canvas
- Dimensions: 290 cm × 300 cm (110 in × 120 in)
- Location: Musée National d'Art Moderne; Paris

Udnie, also known as Udnie (Young American Girl, The Dance), is an oil on canvas painting by French artist Francis Picabia, executed in 1913. It is held at the Musée National d'Art Moderne, Centre Georges Pompidou, in Paris.

== History and description ==
This painting is believed to have been inspired by the performance of a Hindu style dance by Polish dancer Stasia Napierkowska, on board of the ship that brought Picabia to the United States, in 1913, where he was going to attend the Armory Show exhibition of modern art, in Chicago. The painting name is possibly an anagram of the name of musicologist Jean d'Udine, who had a theory of sensory correspondences.

The previous year, Picabia and his friend, the painter Marcel Duchamp, had been very impressed by an exhibition of Italian futurist painters in Paris, which included works by his exponents Umberto Boccioni and Gino Severini, where the dynamics of movement or dancing burst into self-contained colorful forms. This abstract painting is clearly influenced by the dynamism of futurism and the “mechanism” of Marcel Duchamp's works. The abstract forms, in his centrifugal movement, and the metallic colour reflections recall the world of machines.

Picabia stated while in New York, in 1913, that "art is a successful attempt to exteriorize the thought or the inner feeling by projecting on the canvas subjective, emotional, mental states". His painting Udnie is linked to the "musicalism" advocated by the Duchamp brothers, and to orphism, the artistic movement first named by the poet Guillaume Apollinaire in 1913.

== See also ==
- List of works by Francis Picabia
