= Lajos Tscheligi =

Swiss painter (1913–2003)

Lajos Tscheligi (10 August 1913 – 13 June 2003) was a Hungarian painter known for his metaphysical abstractionist style.

== Early life ==
Lajos Tscheligi was born in Budapest from a family of musicians and sculptors. His father, a church painter and restorer, gave him the first painting lessons. As a boy he found colors, shapes and sounds magical and he was driven by a desire to find an answer to all the turmoil around him. His father took him to the church where he worked, and the young Tscheligi learned colors and learned the use of chalk, charcoal and paint. At the age of nine he painted his teacher and his artistic aptitude was noticed for the first time. At the age of eleven he was commissioned to draw a map of the city of Budapest, which was a great honor and earned him his first money.

The family could not pay for him to study art. However, when the art professor Illés Aladár Edvi saw the portrait of the grandmother that the talented twenty-year-old had drawn in charcoal, he and his colleague Oskar Glatz enrolled him as a private student and taught him for four years the theoretical and basic principles of painting. The insight of the young art student that there is no art without nature was reflected in his early landscape paintings in oil and pastel. "In these images you can feel that the artist is a real Hungarian; he hears the sound of the water, feels the breath of the plain and all the freshness that nature brings", one critic wrote after Tscheligi's first exhibition in September 1943.

== After Second World War ==
Tscheligi was in the army and was captured by the Russians and sent to a prison in that country; however, he was able to escape.

In 1945 back in Hungary he joined the Hungarian "Union of Fine Arts". His desire as an artist was to express his perception of light, vitality and the knowledge of the presence of soul and spirit in color and form. His subjects – people, landscapes and events – showed strong vibrant expressiveness. In 1948 he presented three of his pictures at the centenary exhibition in Budapest, where his father, whom he felt spiritually connected to, also showed individual works.

His marriage in 1950 to Agnes Csürös and the desire for a family required a stable income. Tscheligi studied surveying and worked as a construction manager in Eger in the Bück mountains in order to earn money. However his heart and passion was painting, which he did every free minute he had.

== Life outside Hungary ==
In 1956 Hungary was threatened with political turmoil, which culminated in the popular uprising. The young family of four fled to Switzerland and lived in an apartment in Chur. In a studio in the old town of Chur, Tscheligi taught art. In the studio/gallery in St. Moritz he found the light and the freedom to explore philosophical thoughts with the significance of the colors. The unfolding of his inner urge for the expression of much needed transparency created the first abstract works. Influenced by the struggle for survival and the quest for integration in a foreign country, this was a difficult period but very liberating for his work. At last he could paint what he felt. He dedicated himself, inspired by the philosophy of Rudolf Steiner, to study his own personal painting style of metaphysical abstraction and to develop his own color philosophy.

This was followed by invitations for exhibitions locally in Switzerland than France and England. In 1964/65 the family lived in the United States. But out of concern that his son would be called to serve as a soldier in the Vietnam War, the planned emigration was rejected and Tscheligi returned with his family to Switzerland.

Admission as a member in Bern to the "Society of Swiss Painters, Sculptors and Architects" in 1965 and the obtaining of Swiss citizenship in 1971, helped Tscheligi slowly to find his way as an artist in Switzerland and obtain greater attention.

Other numerous exhibitions in Europe, the US, South America and Asia increased the circle of lovers of his art.

On 13 June 2003, Lajos Tscheligi died aged ninety years old.

== Gallery ==
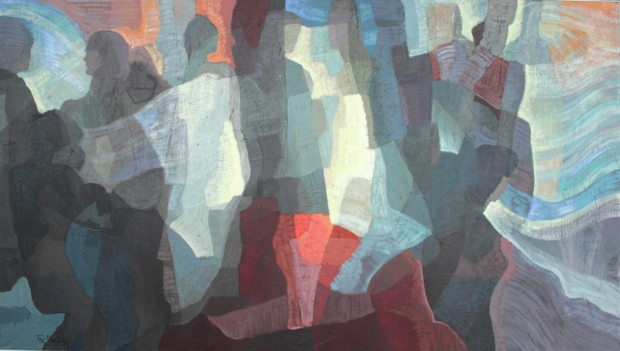
Emanzipation; Acrylic on Canvas; 236x135 cm
