= Max Leognany =

French artist

Max Leognany (12 March 1913 – 11 February 1994) was a French artist.

He grew up in Yport-sur-Mer, and as a young man entered the École des Beaux-Arts (School of Fine Arts).

He studied continuously during the Second World War and received training in a jeweller's workshop. He then specialised in engraving coins and medals, and in 1945 he was awarded the Prix de Rome in the Engraving category. He concentrated mainly on medals, but produced some sculptures, as well as 40 ceremonial swords for members of the French Academy, including the sword of Léopold Sédar Senghor. He did work on both French and foreign decorations, of which the National Order of Merit (Ordre national du Mérite) was one. He was himself a Knight of the Legion of Honour.
