= The Promised Land (Saint-Saëns) =

Oratorio by Camille Saint-Saëns

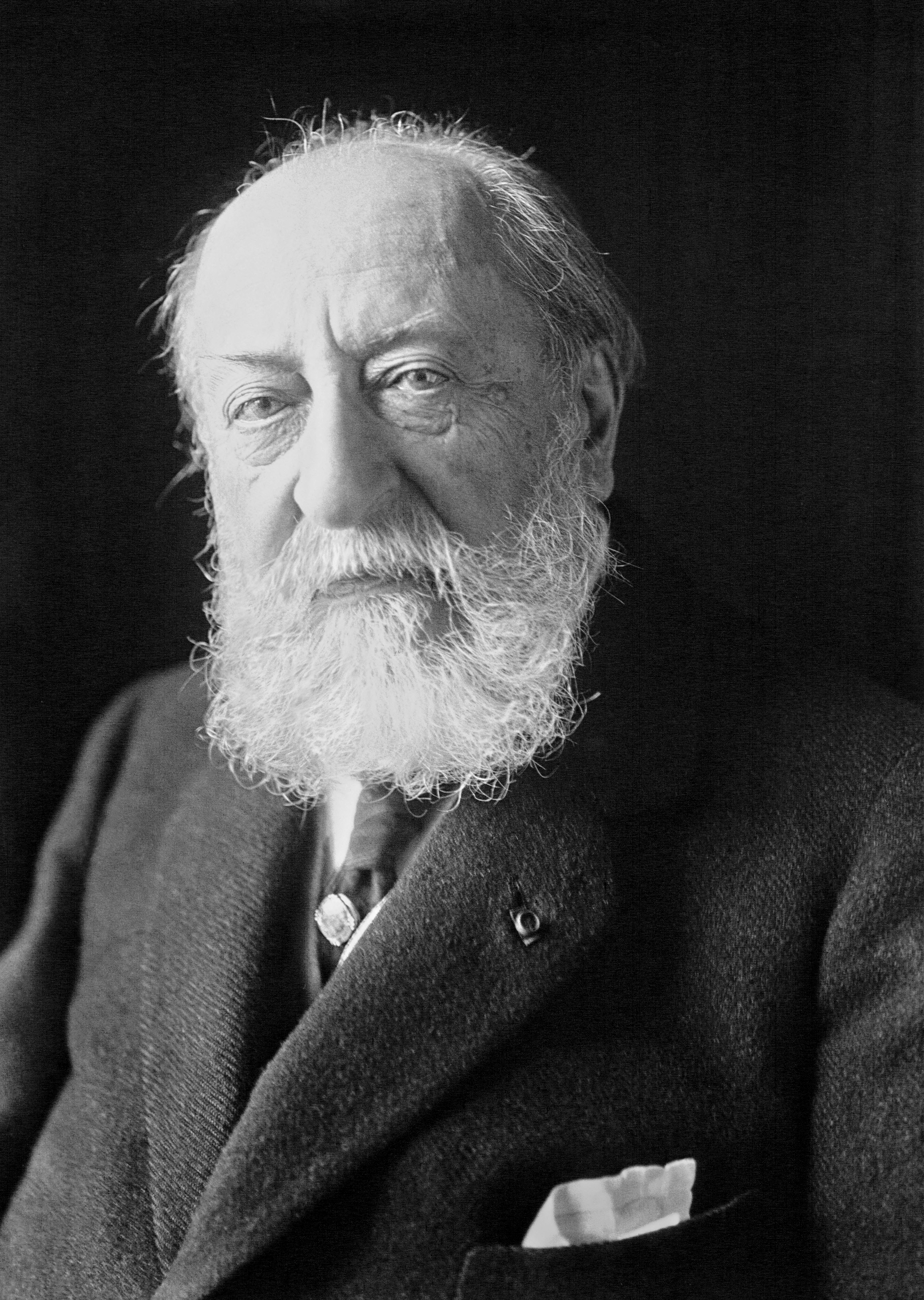
Camille Saint-Saens in 1921

The Promised Land (French: La Terre promise), Op. 140, is an English and later French-language oratorio by Camille Saint-Saëns for the Three Choirs Festival of 1913 and which the composer conducted at Gloucester Cathedral.

Saint-Saëns had asked Herman Klein to arrange the Biblical text for an oratorio, commissioned by the English publisher Novello and originally called The Death of Moses, in 1887, for Norwich. The composer wrote to the librettist Klein that "Moise will probably be my last work. It must worthily crown my career!" However the Norwich authorities were unwilling to pledge themselves in advance to a work of unknown proportions and the project was shelved. In the winter of 1912 the composer took Klein's revised text to Cairo and finished setting it by 15 February 1913. It was then chosen by the Gloucester Festival for performance that year, in part due to Klein's advocacy. Saint-Saëns dedicated the work to Queen Alexandra

The French version was performed only once, at the inauguration of the Théâtre des Champs-Élysées in 1916. The oratorio, which requires organ and full orchestra and choir was not revived until 2004 with a performance by the Académie de Musique, an orchestra of 75 with and choir of 250 singers, at the Église de la Sainte-Trinité, Paris, under Jeanne Roth and Jean-Philippe Sarcos. A German version with text by Otto Neitzel, Das Gelobte Land, was published in 1914.
