= Australian Tapestry Workshop =

Artists' organisation

The Australian Tapestry Workshop (formerly known as the Victorian Tapestry Workshop) is a not-for-profit organisation that employs weavers to create tapestry pieces and promotes tapestry creation though collaboration with contemporary artists. Founding director of the workshop, Sue Walker, described role of the workshop to be "the fostering of artistic collaboration rather than the development of a subservient technical skill".

== History ==
Established in 1976 as the Victorian Tapestry Workshop, the Australian Tapestry Workshop was the product of years of research and planning by Lady Joyce Delacombe and Dame Elisabeth Murdoch supported by Premier and self-appointed Minister for the Arts Rupert Hamer. The two women formed a committee to explore the feasibility of the workshop in 1974 beginning with a study of the local art scene and including research into the methods employed by overseas tapestry workshops. It was agreed that if such a place were to exist in Australia it would have to engage weaver's artistic as well as their technical abilities. The workshop was modelled on the Dovecot Studios in Edinburgh, Scotland, where artists and weavers collaborated to create tapestries. State funding was secured by June 1975 and the workshop was opened on 24 February 1976.

=== Name change ===
The name of the Victorian Tapestry Workshop was changed to the Australian Tapestry Workshop in 2010.

== About ==
The Australian Tapestry Workshop employs weavers to create unique tapestry pieces using the traditional Gobelin technique of tapestry weaving. It has collaborated with over 300 artists since its conception and created over 400 tapestries.

== The building ==
The Australian Tapestry Workshop building in South Melbourne, Victoria was constructed in 1885 by architect Thomas James Crouch of Crouch and Wilson, and updated by Peter Carmichael in 1976 and Peter Williams in 1999. It is a fine example of a Victorian Free Gothic style building and is included in the now defunct Register of the National Estate. The building originally served as drapery establishment Harcourt and Parry Emporium and the Patross Knitting Mills, the title of which is still painted on the façade.

== Significant projects ==
In 1988 the Australian Tapestry Workshop worked with Arthur Boyd to create a 9.18 x 19.9 m tapestry for the Reception Hall of Parliament House in Canberra. It is currently the second largest tapestry in the world.

Some other notable collaborations between artists and the Australian Tapestry Workshop include the translation of works by John Coburn, Jon Cattapan, Juan Davila, Ben McKeown and John Olsen into tapestry.
