= Dining Room in the Country =

Painting by Pierre Bonnard

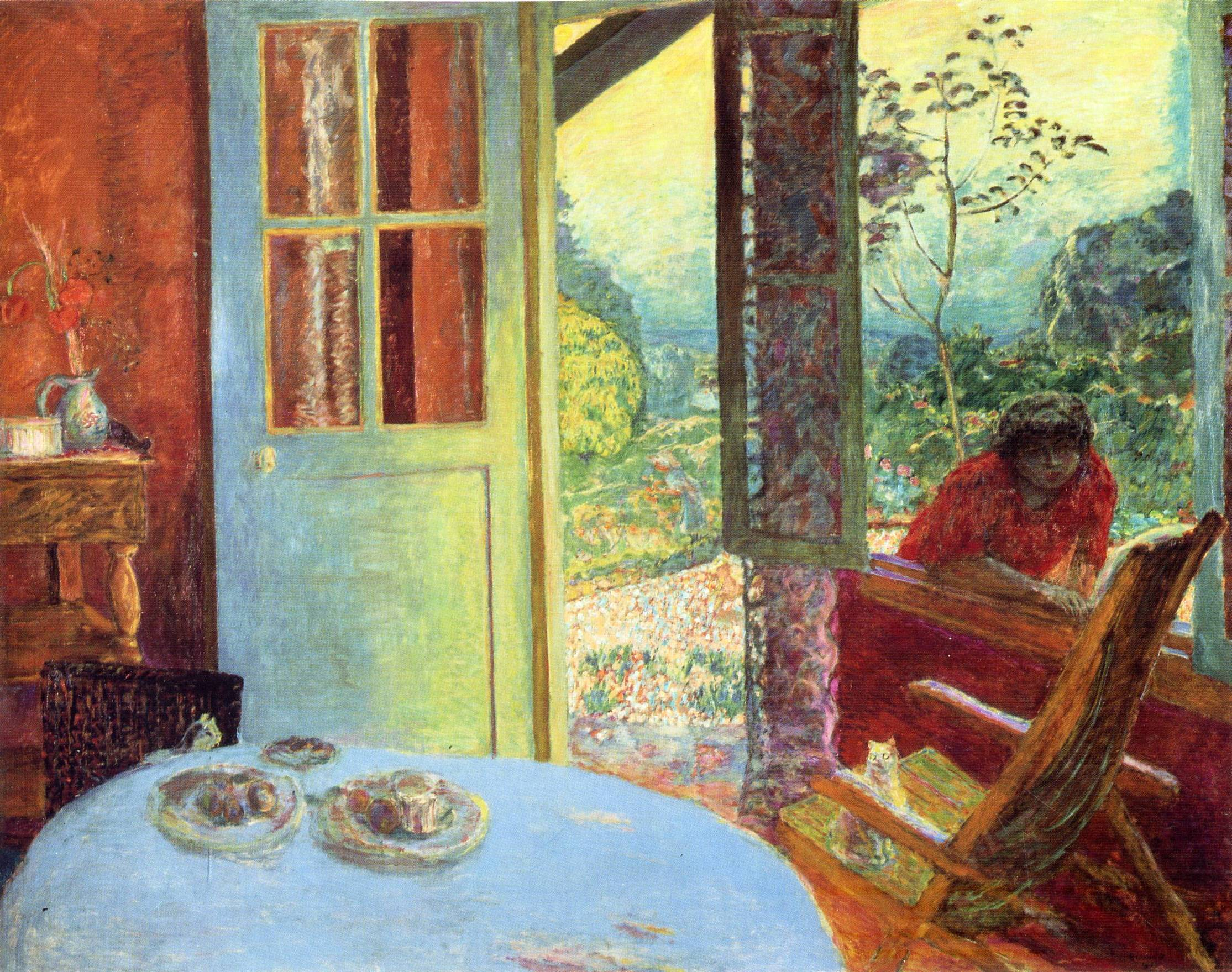
- Artist: Pierre Bonnard
- Year: 1913
- Medium: Oil painting on canvas
- Movement: Post-Impressionism; Nabis
- Dimensions: 162 cm × 202,5 cm (64 in × 797 in)
- Location: Minneapolis, Minneapolis Institute of Art

Dining Room in the Country is an oil-on-canvas painting by the French artist Pierre Bonnard, created in 1913. It is held at the Minneapolis Institute of Art.

== History and description ==
In 1912, Bonnard bought a country house in Verbon, a small town on the Seine, which was called "Ma Roulotte" (My Caravan). The current painting, created in 1913, depicts the dining room of his country house. On the canvas he presents cats sitting on chairs, and Martha, his wife, leaning on a windowsill. A large table, with a white towel, appears in the foreground, while a arms chair appears to the right, and another one is partially seen at the left. The door and the window are wide open and also open the space of the painting to the landscape outside. Bonnard in this work was able to emphasize the expressive qualities of bright colors and large strokes. He combined the interior of the room with the "outside world", the garden seen through an open window and door, and connected different forms through playing with shades. However, unlike most impressionist painters, Bonnard created this canvas entirely from memory.

Harriet Baker states that "On close inspection the painting’s horizontal lines are uncertain. Windows and door frames are painted in wavering brushstrokes, a mark of Bonnard’s indecision as a painter, but also his attention to porousness, to the movement between interior and exterior environments."
