= Roger Testu =

French cartoonist

Roger Testu (12 July 1913 – 2 February 2008), better known by the pen-name Tetsu, was a French press cartoonist and painter whose sardonic single-panel gags became fixtures of popular weeklies after the Second World War.

== Early life and education ==
Roger Testu was born in Bourges, Cher, on 12 July 1913. Before turning to art he worked as a press-distribution manager, soap-factory proprietor and art dealer, receiving no formal artistic training.

At almost forty, in 1951, he took up painting and published his first cartoon in the magazine Noir et Blanc.

== Career in art ==
From 1953 onward Tetsu supplied of one-panel drawings to French and international titles such as France Dimanche, Ici Paris, Jours de France, Le Figaro Magazine, Paris Match, Le Monde and VSD.

He received the Prix Carrizey in 1955 and the Grand Prix de l’Humour noir “Grandville” in 1964, and was appointed Chevalier of the Ordre des Arts et des Lettres by the French Ministry of Culture in 1983.

The BnF accepted a donation of 147 original press drawings from Tetsu’s family in 2009.

He produced "Search South of France" which were two collections of his drawings and paintings.

Roger Testu died in Créteil, Val-de-Marne, on 2 February 2008, aged 94.
