= List of paintings by Wassily Kandinsky =

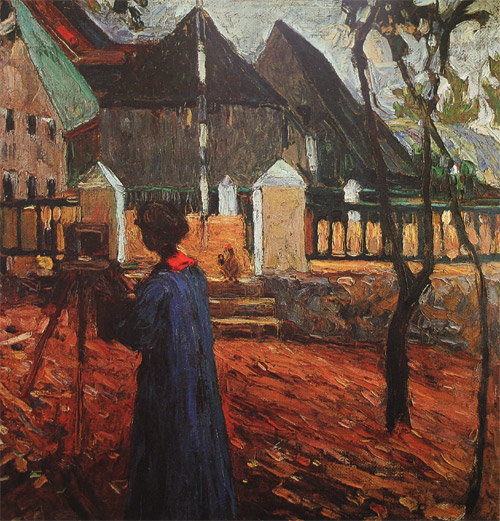
Gabriele Münter by Kandinsky, 1903. See also her portrait of him, 1906.

This is an incomplete list of paintings by the Russian artist Wassily Kandinsky (1866–1944). During his life, Kandinsky was associated with the art movements of Der Blaue Reiter, Expressionism and Abstract painting. Kandinsky is generally credited as the pioneer of abstract art.

After settling in Munich in 1896, Kandinsky formed Der Blaue Reiter with Paul Klee, Franz Marc and Gabriele Münter among others. He returned to Moscow in 1914, after the outbreak of World War I, though left after the Russian Revolution as "his spiritual outlook... was foreign to the argumentative materialism of Soviet society". He returned to Germany and taught at the Bauhaus school of art and architecture from 1922 until the Nazis closed it in 1933. He then moved to France, where he lived for the rest of his life, becoming a French citizen in 1939 and producing some of his most prominent art.

== Paintings ==
=== 1898 to 1909 ===
Image	Year, Title	Location	Medium, H x W in cm, Wikimedia
	1898; Odessa, Port	Tretyakov Gallery, Moscow	Oil paint on canvas 65 × 45; More images
	1900; Kochel – Waterfall I	Lenbachhaus, Munich	32.5 × 23.5; More images
	1901; Schwabing, Winter Sun	Musée National d'Art Moderne, Paris	Oil paint on canvas board 23.8 × 32.3; More images
	1901; Munich – The Isar	Lenbachhaus, Munich	32.5 × 23.6; More images
	1901; Clear Air	Musée National d'Art Moderne, Paris	Oil and tempera on canvas 34 × 52.3; More images
	1901; Sketch for Akhtyrka – Fall	Lenbachhaus, Munich	Oil paint on canvas 23.6 × 32.7; More images
	1901; Munich English Garden	Lenbachhaus, Munich	23.7 × 32.3; More images
	1901 to 1902; Schwabing – Nikolaiplatz	Lenbachhaus, Munich	23.8 × 32.2; More images
	1901 to 1902; Munich	Solomon R. Guggenheim Museum, New York	Oil paint on card board 23.8 × 32.1; More images
	1901 to 1903; Poplars	Musée National d'Art Moderne, Paris	Oil paint on canvas board 23.5 × 32.8; More images
	1901 to 1903; Kochel, Mountain Meadow	Musée National d'Art Moderne, Paris	Oil paint on canvas board 24 × 32.8; More images
	1901 to 1903; Kochel, Landscape with Two Houses	Musée National d'Art Moderne, Paris	Oil paint on canvas board 16.1 × 32.6; More images
	1901 to 1903; Akhtyrka, Park	Musée National d'Art Moderne, Paris	Oil paint on canvas board 23.7 × 32.8; More images
	1901 to 1905; Binz auf Rügen (Twilight)	Musée National d'Art Moderne, Paris	Oil paint on canvas board 23.2 × 32.8; More images
	1902; Kochel, the Bridge	Stedelijk Museum Amsterdam	More images
	1902; Spring, Vicinity of Augsburg	Musée National d'Art Moderne, Paris	Oil paint on card board 23.8 × 33; More images
	1902; Kochel – Schlehdorf	Lenbachhaus, Munich	32.1 × 23.8; More images
	1902; Kochel, Lake and Pier I	Musée National d'Art Moderne, Paris	Oil paint on canvas board 24 × 33; More images
	1902; Mountainous Landscape with Lake	Lenbachhaus, Munich	28 × 76; More images
	1902; Kochel, Lake and Herzogstand	Musée National d'Art Moderne, Paris	Oil paint on canvas board 23 × 32; More images
	1902; Kochel, Old Kesselbergstrasse	Musée National d'Art Moderne, Paris	Oil paint on canvas board 32.8 × 24; More images
	1902; Winter in Schwabing	Musée National d'Art Moderne, Paris	Oil paint on canvas board 23.7 × 32.9; More images
	1902; Old Town II	Musée National d'Art Moderne, Paris	Oil paint on canvas 52 × 78.5; More images
	1902 to 1903; Munich, North Cemetery	Musée National d'Art Moderne, Paris	Oil paint on canvas board 32 × 23.5; More images
	1902 to 1903; Munich, English Garden (Lake with Dinghy)	Musée National d'Art Moderne, Paris	Oil on card board 17 × 52.5; More images
	1903; Kallmünz – Gabriele Münter painting I	Lenbachhaus, Munich	24 × 33; More images
	1903; Kallmünz – Nature study on the Yellow Stagecoach	Lenbachhaus, Munich	23.4 × 32.8; More images
	1903; The Blue Rider	Private collection	Oil paint on card board 55 × 65; More images
	1903; Kallmünz – Gabriele Münter painting II	Lenbachhaus, Munich	Oil paint on canvas 58.5 × 58.5; More images
	1904; Nymphenburg	Minneapolis Institute of Art	Oil paint on canvas More images
	1904; Amsterdam—View from the Window	Solomon R. Guggenheim Museum, New York	Oil paint on card board 23.8 × 33; More images
	1904; In the Forest	Lenbachhaus, Munich	26 × 19.8; More images
	1904; Sketch for 'Sunday (Old Russian)'	Lenbachhaus, Munich	38.5 × 89.2; More images
	1904; Sunday (Old Russian)	Museum Boijmans Van Beuningen, Rotterdam	45 × 95; More images
	1904; Holland – beach chairs	Lenbachhaus, Munich	24 × 32.8; More images
	1905; Tunis, Street	Musée National d'Art Moderne, Paris	Oil paint on canvas board 24 × 32.8; More images
	1905; Tunis, Coastal Landscape I	Musée National d'Art Moderne, Paris	Oil paint on canvas board 24 × 33; More images
	1905; Tunis, Coastal Landscape II	Musée National d'Art Moderne, Paris	Oil paint on canvas board 24 × 33; More images
	1905; Tunis, the Bay	Musée National d'Art Moderne, Paris	Oil paint on canvas board 24 × 33; More images
	1905; Fishing Boats, Sestri	Solomon R. Guggenheim Museum, New York	Oil paint on card board 23.8 × 32.7; More images
	1905; Arab City	Musée National d'Art Moderne, Paris	Tempera on card board 67.3 × 99.5; More images
	1905; Landscape with Yellow Field	Lenbachhaus, Munich	29.8 × 44.5; More images
	1905; Russian beauty in a landscape	Lenbachhaus, Munich	Tempera on board 41.5 × 28.8; More images
	1906; Saint-Cloud Park, Shaded Path	Musée National d'Art Moderne, Paris	Oil paint on canvas 48 × 65; More images
	1906; Rapallo, Stormy Sea	Musée National d'Art Moderne, Paris	Oil paint on canvas board 23 × 33; More images
	1906; Rapallo – Bay	Lenbachhaus, Munich	24 × 33.1; More images
	1906; In the park of St. Cloud – Fall II	Lenbachhaus, Munich	23.6 × 37.7; More images
	1906; Pond in the Park	Solomon R. Guggenheim Museum, New York	Oil paint on card board 33 × 41; More images
	1906; Lied (Chanson) (Chant de la Volga)	Centre Pompidou, Paris	Tempera on glossy cardboard 49 × 66
	1906 to 1907; Saint-Cloud Park	Musée National d'Art Moderne, Paris	Oil paint on card board 24 × 33; More images
	1906 to 1907; Riding Couple	Lenbachhaus, Munich	Oil paint on canvas 55 × 50.5; More images
	1907; The Colourful Life	Lenbachhaus, Munich	Oil paint on canvas 130 × 162.5; More images
	1908; Murnau, Burggrabenstrasse 1	Dallas Museum of Art	Oil paint on card board 50.5 × 63.5; More images
	1908; Red Church	Russian Museum, Saint Petersburg	28 × 19.2
	1908; Munich-Schwabing with the Church of St. Ursula	Lenbachhaus, Munich	Oil paint on card board 68.8 × 49
	1908; View of Murnau	Hermitage Museum, Saint Petersburg	Oil paint on card board 33 × 44.5
	1908; Moscow Environs	Tretyakov Gallery, Moscow	
	1908; Blue Mountain	Solomon R. Guggenheim Museum, New York	107.3 × 97.6
	1908; The Ludwigskirche in Munich	Thyssen-Bornemisza Museum, Madrid	Oil paint on card board 67.3 × 96
	1908; Murnau – View over the Staffelsee	Lenbachhaus, Munich	Oil on pasteboard 32.8 × 41
	1908; Murnau – Landscape with a Tower	Musée National d'Art Moderne, Paris	Oil paint on card board 74 × 98.5
	1908; Murnau – View from the window of the Griesbräu	Lenbachhaus, Munich	Oil on pasteboard 49.8 × 69.6
	1908; Autumn in Bavaria	Musée National d'Art Moderne, Paris	Oil on paper on cardboard 33 × 44.7
	1908; Autumn Landscape with Boats	Private collection	Oil on board 71 × 96.5
	1908; Riegesee, the Village Church	Lenbachhaus, Munich	33 × 45
	1908; Autumn in Murnau	Private collection	Oil on panel 32.3 × 40.9
	1908; Houses in Munich	Von der Heydt Museum, Wuppertal	Oil paint on card board 33 × 41
	1908; Murnau – Houses in the Obermarkt	Thyssen-Bornemisza Museum, Madrid	Oil paint on card board 64.5 × 50.2
	1908; Murnau, Dorfstrasse	Private collection	Oil paint on card board 48 × 69.5
	1908; Murnau – Top of the Johannisstrasse	Thyssen-Bornemisza Museum, Madrid	Oil paint on card board 70 × 48.5
	1909; Group in Crinolines	Solomon R. Guggenheim Museum, New York	95.6 × 150.3
	1909; Study for Improvisation No. 2 (Funeral March)	Lenbachhaus, Munich	Oil on pasteboard 49.8 × 69.8
	1909; Study for Improvisation No. 3	Private collection	Oil and gouache on board 44.5 × 64.7
	1909; Improvisation No. 3	Musée National d'Art Moderne, Paris	94 × 130
	1909; Improvisation 6 (African)	Lenbachhaus, Munich	107 × 95.5
	1909; Railway near Murnau	Lenbachhaus, Munich	Oil on pasteboard 36 × 49
	1909; The Waterfall	Yale University Art Gallery, New Haven	Oil on pasteboard 70 × 97.8
	1909; Murnau – Castle and Church	Lenbachhaus, Munich	Oil on pasteboard 33.1 × 44.8
	1909; Arabs (Cemetery)	Hamburger Kunsthalle	Oil paint on card board 71.5 × 98
	1909; Cemetery and rectory in Kochel	Lenbachhaus, Munich	Oil paint on card board 44.4 × 32.7
	1909; Picture with an Archer	Museum of Modern Art, New York	175 × 144.6
	1909; Wassily Kandinsky - Picture with a Riding Archer and Landscape	Private, Vienna	Oil on wood 35.8 × 44.0
	1909; Kochel – Straight Street	Lenbachhaus, Munich	Oil on pasteboard 32.9 × 44.6
	1909; Landscape near Murnau with Locomotive	Solomon R. Guggenheim Museum, New York	Oil on board 50.5 × 65.1
	1909; Interior (My Dining Room)0	Lenbachhaus, Munich	Oil on pasteboard 50 × 65
	1909; Bedroom in Aintmillerstrasse	Lenbachhaus, Munich	48.5 × 69.5
	1909; Winter Landscape	Hermitage Museum, Saint Petersburg	Oil paint on card board 70 × 97
	1909; Painting with Houses	Private collection	
	1909; Mount	Lenbachhaus, Munich	109 × 109
	1909; Houses at Murnau	Art Institute of Chicago	Oil paint on card board 49 × 64
	1909; Oriental	Lenbachhaus, Munich	Oil on pasteboard 69.5 × 96.5
	1909; Green Lane in Murnau	Lenbachhaus, Munich	Oil paint on card board 33 × 44.6
	1909; Murnau with Rainbow	Lenbachhaus, Munich	Oil paint on card board 33 × 43
	1909 to 1910; Sketch for "Composition II"	Solomon R. Guggenheim Museum, New York	97.5 × 131.1

=== 1910 to 1919 ===
Image	Year, Title	Location	Medium, H x W in cm, Wikimedia
	1910; Study for Improvisation V	Minneapolis Institute of Art	Oil on pulp board 70.2 × 69.9
	1910; Lake	Tretyakov Gallery, Moscow	98 × 105
	1910; Landscape with Rolling Hills	Solomon R. Guggenheim Museum, New York	Oil on board 33 × 44.8
	1910; Murnau – Mountain Landscape with the Church	Lenbachhaus, Munich	Oil paint on card board 32.7 × 44.8
	1910; View of Murnau with Church	Private collection	110.6 × 120
	1910; Murnau with Church I	Lenbachhaus, Munich	Oil on pasteboard 64.7 × 50.2
	1910; Improvisation 7 (Storm)	Yale University Art Gallery, New Haven	Oil on pasteboard 70 × 48.7
	1910; Improvisation 9	Staatsgalerie Stuttgart	110 × 110
	1910; Improvisation 11	Russian Museum, Saint Petersburg	97.5 × 106.5
	1910; Improvisation 12 (The Rider)	Lenbachhaus, Munich	97 × 106.5
	1910; The Cow	Lenbachhaus, Munich	95.5 × 105
	1910; Improvisation 14	Musée National d'Art Moderne, Paris	74 × 125
	1910 to 1911; Winter Landscape with Church	Solomon R. Guggenheim Museum, New York	Oil on board 33 × 44.5
	1910 to 1911; The Cossacks	Tate Modern, London	94.6 × 130.2
	1910 to 1911; Study for "Winter No.2"	Lenbachhaus, Munich	Oil on pasteboard 33.1 × 45
	1911; Improvisation 18 (with Tombstone)	Lenbachhaus, Munich	141 × 120
	1911; Improvisation 19	Lenbachhaus, Munich	120 × 141.5
	1911; Improvisation 19a	Lenbachhaus, Munich	97 × 106
	1911; Improvisation 21	Private collection	108 × 108
	1911; Improvisation 21a	Lenbachhaus, Munich	96 × 105
	1911; Impression III	Lenbachhaus, Munich	77.5 × 100
	1911; Impression IV (Gendarme)	Lenbachhaus, Munich	95 × 107
	1911; Impression V	Musée National d'Art Moderne, Paris	106 × 157.5
	1911; Impression VI	Lenbachhaus, Munich	107.5 × 95
	1911; The Lyrical	Museum Boijmans Van Beuningen, Rotterdam	94 × 130
	1911; Pastorale	Solomon R. Guggenheim Museum, New York	106.4 × 157.2
	1911; St George II	Russian Museum, Saint Petersburg	107 × 95
	1911; St George III	Lenbachhaus, Munich	97.5 × 107.5
	1911; All Saint's Day I	Lenbachhaus, Munich	Oil and gouache on cardboard 50 × 64.8
	1911; All Saint's Day II	Lenbachhaus, Munich	86 × 99
	1911; Painting with Troika	Art Institute of Chicago	Oil paint on card board 69.7 × 97.3
	1911; Murnau with Locomotive	Saint Louis Art Museum	95.9 × 104.5
	1911; Romantic Landscape	Lenbachhaus, Munich	94.3 × 129
	1911; Eastern Suite (Arabs III)	National Gallery of Armenia, Yerevan	106 × 157
	1911; Composition V	Private collection	190 × 275
	1911; With Sun	Lenbachhaus, Munich	Reverse glass painting 30.6 × 40.3
	1911; All Saints Day I	Lenbachhaus, Munich	Reverse glass painting 34.5 × 40.5
	1911; Lion Hunt	Solomon R. Guggenheim Museum, New York	Oil reverse glass painting 9.4 × 13.6
	1911; Holy Vladimir	Lenbachhaus, Munich	Reverse glass painting 28.7 × 25.2
	1911; St. George III	Lenbachhaus, Munich	Tempera reverse glass painting 23.6 × 22.8
	1911; Apocalypti Horseman I	Lenbachhaus, Munich	Tempera and ink reverse glass painting 29.5 × 20.3
	1911; Santa Francisca	Solomon R. Guggenheim Museum, New York	Oil reverse glass painting 15.6 × 11.8
	1911; St. George II	Lenbachhaus, Munich	Tempera reverse glass painting
	1911; Great Resurrection	Lenbachhaus, Munich	Tempera reverse glass painting 23.8 × 24
	1912; Judgement Day	Musée National d'Art Moderne, Paris	Water-based paint and India ink reverse glass painting 33.6 × 45.3
	1912; Improvisation 26	Lenbachhaus, Munich	97 × 107.5
	1912; Improvisation 27 (Garden of Love II)	Metropolitan Museum of Art, New York	120.3 × 140.3
	1912; Picture with Pince-nez	Musée National d'Art Moderne, Paris	Water-based paint and India ink reverse glass painting 32.5 × 22.5
	1912; Sketch 160A	Museum of Fine Arts, Houston	94.9 × 108
	1912; Black Spot I	Russian Museum, Saint Petersburg	101 × 131
	1912; Lady in Moscow	Lenbachhaus, Munich	108.8 × 108.8
	1912; Improvisation 28	Solomon R. Guggenheim Museum, New York	111.4 × 162.2
	1912; Improvisation 29 (The Swan)	Philadelphia Museum of Art	106 × 97
	1912; Autumn II	The Phillips Collection, Washington D.C.	60.6 × 82.5
	1912; Landscape with Two Poplars	Art Institute of Chicago	78.8 × 100.4
	1912; With Rider	Musée National d'Art Moderne, Paris	Reverse glass painting 27.5 × 28
	1913; Landscape with Rain	Solomon R. Guggenheim Museum, New York	70.5 × 78.4
	1913; Improvisation No. 30 (Cannons)	Art Institute of Chicago	111 × 111.3
	1913; Improvisation 31 (Sea Battle)	National Gallery of Art, Washington D.C.	140.7 × 119.7
	1913; Image with a White Shape	Kunstmuseum Den Haag	120.3 × 139.8
	1913; Improvisation 33 (Orient I)	Stedelijk Museum Amsterdam	
	1913; Black Lines	Solomon R. Guggenheim Museum, New York	130.5 × 131.1
	1913; Composition VI	Hermitage Museum, Saint Petersburg	195 × 300
	1913; Small Pleasures	Solomon R. Guggenheim Museum, New York	110.5 × 120
	1913; Painting with White Border	Solomon R. Guggenheim Museum, New York	140.3 × 200.3
	1913; Landscape	Hermitage Museum, Saint Petersburg	88 × 100
	1913; Study for Composition VII (Draft 2)	Lenbachhaus, Munich	100 × 140
	1913; Draft 3 for Composition VII	Lenbachhaus, Munich	Oil and tempera on canvas 90.2 × 125.2
	1913; Composition VII	Tretyakov Gallery, Moscow	200 × 300
	1913; Painting with Green Centre	Art Institute of Chicago	108.9 × 118.4
	1913; Dreamy Improvisation	Pinakothek der Moderne, Munich	130.5 × 130.5
	1913; Improvisation Deluge	Lenbachhaus, Munich	95.8 × 150.3
	1913; Light Picture	Solomon R. Guggenheim Museum, New York	Oil and resin on canvas 77.8 × 100.2
	1913; Landscape with Red Spots	Museum Folkwang, Essen	78 × 100
	1913; Landscape with Red Spots, No 2	Peggy Guggenheim Collection, Venice	117.5 × 140
	1914; Improvisation Klamm	Lenbachhaus, Munich	110 × 110
	1914; Little Painting with Yellow (Improvisation)	Philadelphia Museum of Art	78.7 × 100.6
	1914; Large Study	Museum Boijmans Van Beuningen, Rotterdam	
	1914; Large Study on a Mural for Edwin R. Campbell (Summer)	Lenbachhaus, Munich	99 × 59.5
	1914; Panel for Edwin R. Campbell No. 1	Museum of Modern Art, New York	162.5 × 80
	1914; Panel for Edwin R. Campbell No. 2	Museum of Modern Art, New York	162.6 × 122.7
	1914; Panel for Edwin R. Campbell No. 3	Museum of Modern Art, New York	162.5 × 92.1
	1914; Panel for Edwin R. Campbell No. 4	Museum of Modern Art, New York	163 × 122.5
	1914; Untitled Improvisation	Los Angeles County Museum of Art	Oil paint on card board 64.8 × 50.2
	1914; Fugue	Beyeler Foundation, Riehen	129.5 × 129.5
	1914; Painting with Three Spots	Thyssen-Bornemisza Museum, Madrid	121 × 111
	1914; Painting with a Red Stain	Musée National d'Art Moderne, Paris	130 × 130
	1914; Painting on Light Ground	Musée National d'Art Moderne, Paris	100 × 78
	1914; Untitled Improvisation I	Lenbachhaus, Munich	Oil tempera on cardboard 65 × 50.2
	1916; Moscow	Tretyakov Gallery, Moscow	51.5 × 49.5
	1916; Zubovsky Square	Lenbachhaus, Munich	Oil on canvas on cardboard 41.8 × 45.8
	1916; Moscow, Zubovskaya Square, Study	Tretyakov Gallery, Moscow	
	1916; View of Moscow from the Window of Kandinsky's Apartment at No. 1, Zubovsky Square	Kunstmuseum Den Haag	Oil paint on card board 39.6 × 36.6
	1917; Improvisation 209	Krasnoyarsk Museum of Fine Arts	
	1917; Improvisation No. 217. The Gray Oval	Yekaterinburg Museum of Fine Arts, Russia	105 × 133.5
	1917; A Riding Amazon	National Art Museum of Azerbaijan, Baku	Reverse glass painting 16 × 13
	1917; Blue Crest	Russian Museum, Saint Petersburg	
	1917; Akhtyrka, Nearby Dacha at the Pond's Edge	Musée National d'Art Moderne, Paris	Oil paint on card board 21 × 28.7
	1917; Akhtyrka, Landscape with Red Church	Musée National d'Art Moderne, Paris	Oil paint on card board 21 × 28.7
	1917; Akhtyrka, Nina and Tatiana in the Veranda	Musée National d'Art Moderne, Paris	27.5 × 33.6
	1917; Akhtyrka, Pond in the Park	Musée National d'Art Moderne, Paris	29.5 × 37.5
	1917; Akhtyrka, Main Entry to the Dacha	Musée National d'Art Moderne, Paris	27.5 × 31.5
	1917; Akhtyrka, Framework for a Pile of Hay and Farm	Musée National d'Art Moderne, Paris	Oil paint on card board 23.5 × 33.5
	1918; Amazon in Mountains	Russian Museum, Saint Petersburg	Reverse glass painting 31 × 25
	1918; With fruits	Private Collection, Vienna, Austria	Reverse glass painting 34 × 29
	1919; Two Ovals	Russian Museum, Saint Petersburg	107 × 89.5
	1919; In Grey	Musée National d'Art Moderne, Paris	129 × 176

=== 1920 to 1929 ===
Image	Year, Title	Location	Medium, H x W in cm, Wikimedia
	1920; Points	Ohara Museum of Art, Kurashiki	110.3 × 91.8
	1920; Red Oval	Solomon R. Guggenheim Museum, New York	71.5 × 71.5
	1920; White Line	Museum Ludwig, Cologne	98 × 80
	1921; Blue Segment	Solomon R. Guggenheim Museum, New York	Oil on canvas
	1921; Multicoloured Circle	Yale University Art Gallery, New Haven	138.2 × 180
	1921; Red Spot II	Lenbachhaus, Munich	131 × 181
	1921; Circles on Black	Solomon R. Guggenheim Museum, New York	136.5 × 119.7
	1922; Black Grid	Musée d'Arts de Nantes	96.2 × 106.4
	1922; White Cross	Peggy Guggenheim Collection, Venice	100.5 × 110.6
	1922; Small Worlds I	Norton Simon Museum, Pasadena	24.8 × 21.9
	1922; Blue circle	Solomon R. Guggenheim Museum, New York	Oil on Canvas
	1923; On White II	Musée National d'Art Moderne, Paris	105 × 98
	1923; Composition VIII	Solomon R. Guggenheim Museum, New York	Oil on Canvas; 140 × 201
	1923; Circles in a Circle	Philadelphia Museum of Art	98.7 × 95.6
	1923; Black and Violet	Private collection	77.8 × 100.4
	1923; In the Black Square	Solomon R. Guggenheim Museum, New York	97.5 × 93.3
	1924; Yellow Accompaniment	Solomon R. Guggenheim Museum, New York	99.2 × 97.4
	1924; Blue Painting	Solomon R. Guggenheim Museum, New York	50.7 × 49.5
	1924; Quiet Harmony	Museum Kunstpalast, Dusseldorf	Oil on paper 62.5 × 51
	1924; Contrasting Sounds	Musée National d'Art Moderne, Paris	Oil paint on card board 70 × 49.5
	1924; Fall Silent	Museum Boijmans Van Beuningen, Rotterdam	Oil and ink on canvas 55.3 × 49.3
	1924; Quiet Pink	Museum Ludwig, Cologne	63.6 × 48.2
	1924; Rose with Gray	Nelson-Atkins Museum of Art, Kansas City	Oil on pulpboard 59.8 × 48.6
	1924; A Centre	Kunstmuseum Den Haag	140.7 × 99.8
	1925; Bright Unity	Solomon R. Guggenheim Museum, New York	Oil on board 69.9 × 49.9
	1925; Pointed and Round	Solomon R. Guggenheim Museum, New York	Oil on board 69.8 × 50
	1925; Three Elements	Strasbourg Museum of Modern and Contemporary Art	Oil paint on card board 68 × 48
	1925; Swinging	Tate Modern, London	Oil on board 70.5 × 50.2
	1925; Yellow-Red-Blue	Musée National d'Art Moderne, Paris	128 × 201.5
	1925; Abstract Interpretation	Yale University Art Gallery, New Haven	Oil on board 49.5 × 34.6
	1925; In the Bright Oval	Thyssen-Bornemisza Museum, Madrid	Oil on carton 73 × 59
	1925; Black Triangle	Museum Boijmans Van Beuningen, Rotterdam	Oil paint on card board 95 × 70.7
	1925; Oval No.2	Musée National d'Art Moderne, Paris	Oil paint on card board 34.5 × 28.7
	1925; In Blue	Kunstsammlung Nordrhein-Westfalen, Düsseldorf	Oil on paper 80 × 110
	1925; Sign	Los Angeles County Museum of Art	Oil paint on card board 68.9 × 49
	1926; Three Sounds	Solomon R. Guggenheim Museum, New York	60.3 × 59.7
	1926; Extended	Solomon R. Guggenheim Museum, New York	Oil on panel 95.3 × 44.1
	1926; To Nina for Christmas	Musée National d'Art Moderne, Paris	Oil paint on card board 32.8 × 44.6
	1926; Development	Musée National d'Art Moderne, Paris	Oil paint on card board 32 × 40
	1926; Easter Egg	Musée National d'Art Moderne, Paris	Oil paint on card board 26.5 × 22
	1926; Accent in Rose	Musée National d'Art Moderne, Paris	100.5 × 80.5
	1926; Small Yellow	Yale University Art Gallery, New Haven	Oil on board 41.5 × 32.3
	1926; Several Circles	Solomon R. Guggenheim Museum, New York	140.7 × 140.3
	1926; Yellow Centre	Museum Boijmans Van Beuningen, Rotterdam	45.5 × 37.6
	1927; Rays	Museum Boijmans Van Beuningen, Rotterdam	99.5 × 74
	1927; Isolated Sounds	Musée National d'Art Moderne, Paris	Oil paint on card board 33.1 × 40.9
	1927; Free	Museo Nacional Centro de Arte Reina Sofía, Madrid	Oil paint on card board 50 × 37
	1927; Heavy Circles	Norton Simon Museum, Pasadena	57.2 × 52.1
	1928; On the Points	Musée National d'Art Moderne, Paris	140 × 140
	1928; A Circle	Musée National d'Art Moderne, Paris	35 × 25
	1928; Gentle Event	Musée National d'Art Moderne, Paris	Oil paint on card board 38.6 × 67.8
	1928; Coloured Sticks	Solomon R. Guggenheim Museum, New York	Varnished tempera on paperboard 42.9 × 32.7
	1929; Cold	Musée National d'Art Moderne, Paris	Oil paint on card board 48.8 × 49
	1929; Eight Times	Musée National d'Art Moderne, Paris	Oil on granite preparation on plywood 24.3 × 40
	1929; Levels	Solomon R. Guggenheim Museum, New York	Oil on masonite 56.5 × 40.6
	1929; Untitled	Musée National d'Art Moderne, Paris	Oil paint on card board 11.4 × 33
	1929; Circle (with Brown)	Museo Nacional de Bellas Artes, Buenos Aires	Oil paint on card board 51.5 × 38
	1929; One-Two	Museum Boijmans Van Beuningen, Rotterdam	Oil paint on card board 51.4 × 41.4
	1929; Inner Alliance	Albertina, Vienna	76 × 66
	1929; Upward	Peggy Guggenheim Collection, Venice	70 × 49
	1929; Light in Heavy	Museum Boijmans Van Beuningen, Rotterdam	Oil paint on card board 49.5 × 49.5
	1929; Pink Sweet	Solomon R. Guggenheim Museum, New York	Oil on board

=== 1930 to 1939 ===
Image	Year, Title	Location	Medium, H x W in cm, Wikimedia
	1930; Yellow Border	Los Angeles County Museum of Art	Oil paint on card board 49 × 49
	1930; Two Squares	Musée National d'Art Moderne, Paris	Tempera on cardboard 33.2 × 23.6
	1930; Flächen und Linien (Surfaces and Lines)	Private Collection (listed Sotheby's March 2, 2023 Lot 239)	Oil on Board; 49 × 70
	1930; Leichtes	Musée National d'Art Moderne, Paris	Ripolin on cardboard 69 × 48
	1930; 13 Rectangles	Musée National d'Art Moderne, Paris	Oil paint on card board 69.5 × 59.5
	1930; Green Void	Musée National d'Art Moderne, Paris	Oil paint on card board 35 × 40
	1930; White Sharpness	Museum Boijmans Van Beuningen, Rotterdam	Oil paint on card board 86.8 × 65.5
	1930; Moody	Museum Boijmans Van Beuningen, Rotterdam	Oil paint on card board 40.5 × 56
	1930; Far Away	Solomon R. Guggenheim Museum, New York	Oil on board
	1931; Slowed Release	Musée National d'Art Moderne, Paris	Oil and tempera on cardboard 59.8 × 69.5
	1931; Brownish	San Francisco Museum of Modern Art	Oil paint on card board 49.2 × 70.2
	1931; Soft Pressure	Museum of Modern Art, New York	Oil on plywood 99.5 × 99
	1931; Inclination	Solomon R. Guggenheim Museum, New York	Oil and tempera on board
	1932; Unequal	Norton Simon Museum, Pasadena	Oil and gouache on canvas 60 × 70.2
	1932; Decisive Rose	Solomon R. Guggenheim Museum, New York	81 × 100
	1932; Fixed Flight	Private collection	49 × 70
	1932; White - Soft and Hard	Museum of Modern Art, New York	Oil and gouache on canvas 80 × 99.8
	1933; Development in Brown	Musée National d'Art Moderne, Paris	101 × 120.5
	1933; Pink Compensation	Musée National d'Art Moderne, Paris	Oil and tempera on canvas 92 × 73
	1934; Graceful Ascent	Solomon R. Guggenheim Museum, New York	80.3 × 80.6
	1934; Striped	Solomon R. Guggenheim Museum, New York	Oil and sand on canvas 81 × 100
	1934; Two Surroundings	Stedelijk Museum Amsterdam	
	1934; Black Forms on White	Zervos Museum, Vézelay	70 × 70
	1935; Succession	The Phillips Collection, Washington D.C.	80.9 × 100
	1935; Two Green Points	Musée National d'Art Moderne, Paris	Oil and sand on canvas 115 × 162.5
	1935; Green Accent	Solomon R. Guggenheim Museum, New York	Tempera and oil on canvas 81.3 × 100
	1935; Accompanied Contrast	Solomon R. Guggenheim Museum, New York	Oil and sand on canvas 97.1 × 162.1
	1935; Brown with Supplement	Museum Boijmans Van Beuningen, Rotterdam	81 × 100
	1935; Movement I	Tretyakov Gallery, Moscow	116 × 89
	1935; Orange Violet	Solomon R. Guggenheim Museum, New York	Oil on Canvas; 89.4 × 116.5
	1936; Composition IX	Musée National d'Art Moderne, Paris	113.5 × 195
	1936; Dominant Curve	Solomon R. Guggenheim Museum, New York	129.2 × 194.3
	1936; Environment	Solomon R. Guggenheim Museum, New York	Oil on Canvas
	1937; Sweet Trifles	Strasbourg Museum of Modern and Contemporary Art	Oil and watercolour on canvas 60 × 25
	1937; Capricious Forms	Solomon R. Guggenheim Museum, New York	88.9 × 114.8
	1937; Thirty	Musée National d'Art Moderne, Paris	81 × 100
	1938; Yellow Painting	Solomon R. Guggenheim Museum, New York	Oil and enamel on canvas 116.4 × 88.9
	1938; La Forme Rouge	Private collection	82 × 60
	1938; Colourful Ensemble	Musée National d'Art Moderne, Paris	116 × 89
	1938; Penetrating Green	Baltimore Museum of Art	74.1 × 125.4
	1939; Composition X	Kunstsammlung Nordrhein-Westfalen, Düsseldorf	130 × 195
	1939; Complex-Simple	Museum of Grenoble	100.5 × 82

=== 1940 to 1944 ===
Image	Year, Title	Location	Medium, H x W in cm, Wikimedia
	1940; Sky Blue	Musée National d'Art Moderne, Paris	100 × 73
	1940; Moderation	Solomon R. Guggenheim Museum, New York	Oil and enamel on canvas 99.7 × 64.6
	1940; Around the Circle	Solomon R. Guggenheim Museum, New York	Oil and enamel on canvas 96.8 × 146
	1940; Around the Circle	Solomon R. Guggenheim Museum, New York	Oil and enamel on canvas 97.2 × 146.4cm
	1940; Diverse Parties	Lenbachhaus, Munich	89 × 116
	1940; Little Accents	Solomon R. Guggenheim Museum, New York	Oil on wood panel 32 × 42
	1940; The Whole	National Museum of Modern Art, Tokyo	
	1940; Untitled	Solomon R. Guggenheim Museum, New York	Gouache on brown card
	1941; Various Actions	Solomon R. Guggenheim Museum, New York	Oil and enamel on canvas 89.2 × 116.2
	1942; Vertical Accents	Solomon R. Guggenheim Museum, New York	Oil on wood panel 32.1 × 41.9
	1942; Reciprocal Accords	Musée National d'Art Moderne, Paris	114 × 146
	1942; At rest	Private collection	
	1943; Around the Line	Thyssen-Bornemisza Museum, Madrid	Oil paint on card board 42 × 57.8
	1943; Circle and Square	Musée National d'Art Moderne, Paris	Oil and gouache on cardboard 42 × 58
	1943; Fragments	Solomon R. Guggenheim Museum, New York	Oil and gouache on board 41.9 × 57.9
	1943; Conglomerate	Musée National d'Art Moderne, Paris	Oil and gouache on cardboard 58 × 42
	1943; White Figure	Solomon R. Guggenheim Museum, New York	Oil paint on card board 58 × 42
	1944; Tempered Elan	Musée National d'Art Moderne, Paris	Oil paint on card board 42 × 58
	1944; Unfinished Painting	Musée National d'Art Moderne, Paris	Oil paint on card board 42 × 58
	1944; Ribbon with Squares	Solomon R. Guggenheim Museum, New York	Oil and gouache on board 41.9 × 57.8
	1944; Unfinished Painting	Musée National d'Art Moderne, Paris	Oil and gouache on cardboard 42 × 58
	1944; Untitled	Musée National d'Art Moderne, Paris	Oil and tempera on cardboard 58 × 42
	1944; The Little Red Circle	Musée National d'Art Moderne, Paris	Oil and gouache on cardboard 42 × 58

== Museums ==
- Albertina, Vienna
- Art Institute of Chicago
- Baltimore Museum of Art
- Beyeler Foundation, Riehen
- Dallas Museum of Art
- Hermitage Museum, Saint Petersburg
- Kunsthalle Hamburg
- Kunsthalle Mannheim
- Kunstmuseum Den Haag
- Kunstsammlung Nordrhein-Westfalen, Düsseldorf
- Lenbachhaus, Munich
- Los Angeles County Museum of Art
- Metropolitan Museum of Art, New York
- Minneapolis Institute of Art
- Musée d'Arts de Nantes
- Musée National d'Art Moderne, Paris
- Museo Nacional Centro de Arte Reina Sofía, Madrid
- Museo Nacional de Bellas Artes (Buenos Aires)
- Museum Boijmans Van Beuningen, Rotterdam
- Museum Folkwang, Essen
- Museum Kunstpalast, Dusseldorf
- Museum Ludwig, Cologne
- Museum of Fine Arts, Houston
- Museum of Grenoble
- Museum of Modern Art, New York City
- National Art Museum of Azerbaijan, Baku
- National Gallery of Armenia, Yerevan
- National Gallery of Art, Washington D.C.
- National Museum of Modern Art, Tokyo
- Nelson-Atkins Museum of Art, Kansas City
- Norton Simon Museum, Pasadena
- Ohara Museum of Art, Kurashiki
- Peggy Guggenheim Collection, Venice
- Philadelphia Museum of Art
- Pinakothek der Moderne, Munich
- Russian Museum, Saint Petersburg
- Saint Louis Art Museum
- San Francisco Museum of Modern Art
- Solomon R. Guggenheim Museum, New York
- Staatsgalerie Stuttgart
- Stedelijk Museum Amsterdam
- Strasbourg Museum of Modern and Contemporary Art
- Tate Modern, London
- The Phillips Collection, Washington D.C.
- Thyssen-Bornemisza Museum, Madrid
- Tretyakov Gallery, Moscow
- Van Abbemuseum, Eindhoven
- Von der Heydt Museum, Wuppertal
- Yale University Art Gallery, New Haven
- Yekaterinburg Museum of Fine Arts, Russia

== See also ==
- The Blue Rider (1903)
- Das Bunte Leben (1907)
- Landscape with Red Spots (1913)
- Composition VI (1913)
- Composition VII (1913)
- Improvisation No. 30 (Cannons) (1911–1913)
- Auf Weiss II (Sur blanc II) (1923)
- Three Elements (1925)
- Upward (1929)
- Composition X (1939)
- Der Blaue Reiter
