= The Blue Rider (Kandinsky) =

1903 painting by Wassily Kandinsky

- Der Blaue Reiter (German)
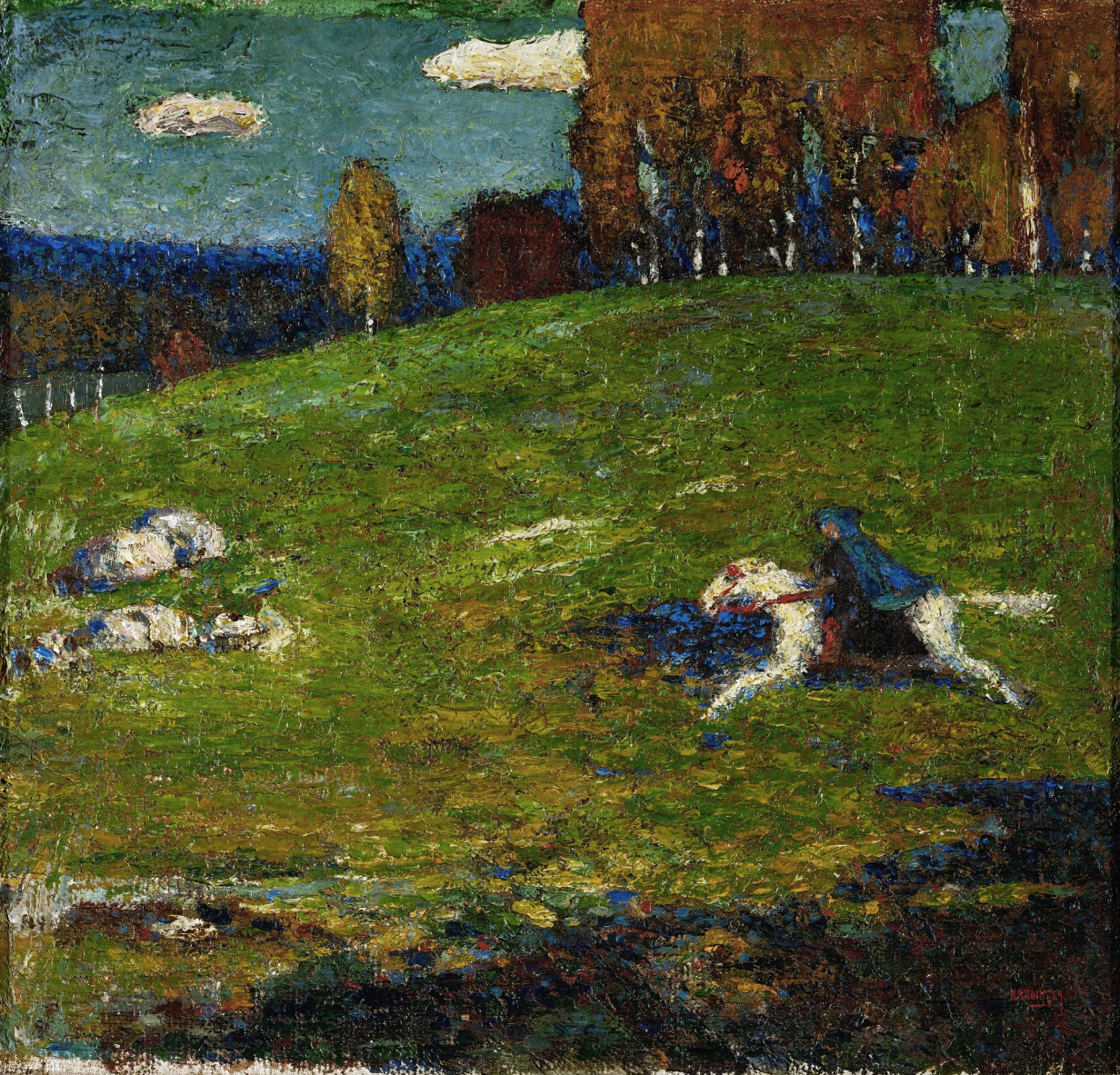
- Artist: Wassily Kandinsky
- Year: 1903
- Medium: Oil on cardboard
- Dimensions: 55 cm × 65 cm (22 in × 26 in)
- Location: Private collection in Zurich

The Blue Rider (German: Der Blaue Reiter) is a 1903 oil painting by Wassily Kandinsky. The work depicts a rider in a blue cloak riding on a white horse through a meadow, with a forest in the background. The painting uses bright colors, repetition of shapes, and short brush strokes creating a sense of motion.

The painting contains elements of many different art movements and it marks Kandinsky's transition from figurative art to abstraction. Interpretations of the painting suggest a heavy use of symbolism; for example, critics associate the rider with Saint George, and that he is fighting the dragon of materialism.

The Blue Rider may have inspired the name of the art group and almanac, Der Blaue Reiter, both founded by Kandinsky in collaboration with Franz Marc. This movement played a key role in the development of abstract art.

== Background ==
Wassily Kandinsky studied law and political economy at the Moscow State University (MSU) in 1886. At the MSU, Kandinsky befriended Nikolai Kharuzin, an ethnography student, who prompted Kandinsky's interested in the field, soon becoming involved in the Society of Devotees of Natural Science, Anthropology, and Ethnography (OLEAE). In 1889, he went on an ethnographic excursion, sponsored by the OLEAE, to study the Komi people in the Vologda Oblast. There he encountered brightly painted traditional houses, an experience he later called a “miracle” that influenced his art.

At the age of 30, Kandinsky decided to dedicate himself to art. This choice was effected by his struggle to recognize the subject in one of Claude Monet's Haystacks. Kandinsky wrote about this experience:

That it was a haystack, the catalogue informed me. I didn’t recognize it. I found this nonrecognition painful, and thought that the painter had no right to paint so indistinctly. I had a dull feeling that the object was lacking in this picture. And I noticed with surprise and confusion that the picture not only gripped me, but impressed itself ineradicably upon my memory, always hovering quite unexpectedly before my eyes, down to the last detail.

— Wassily Kandinsky, Reminiscences,

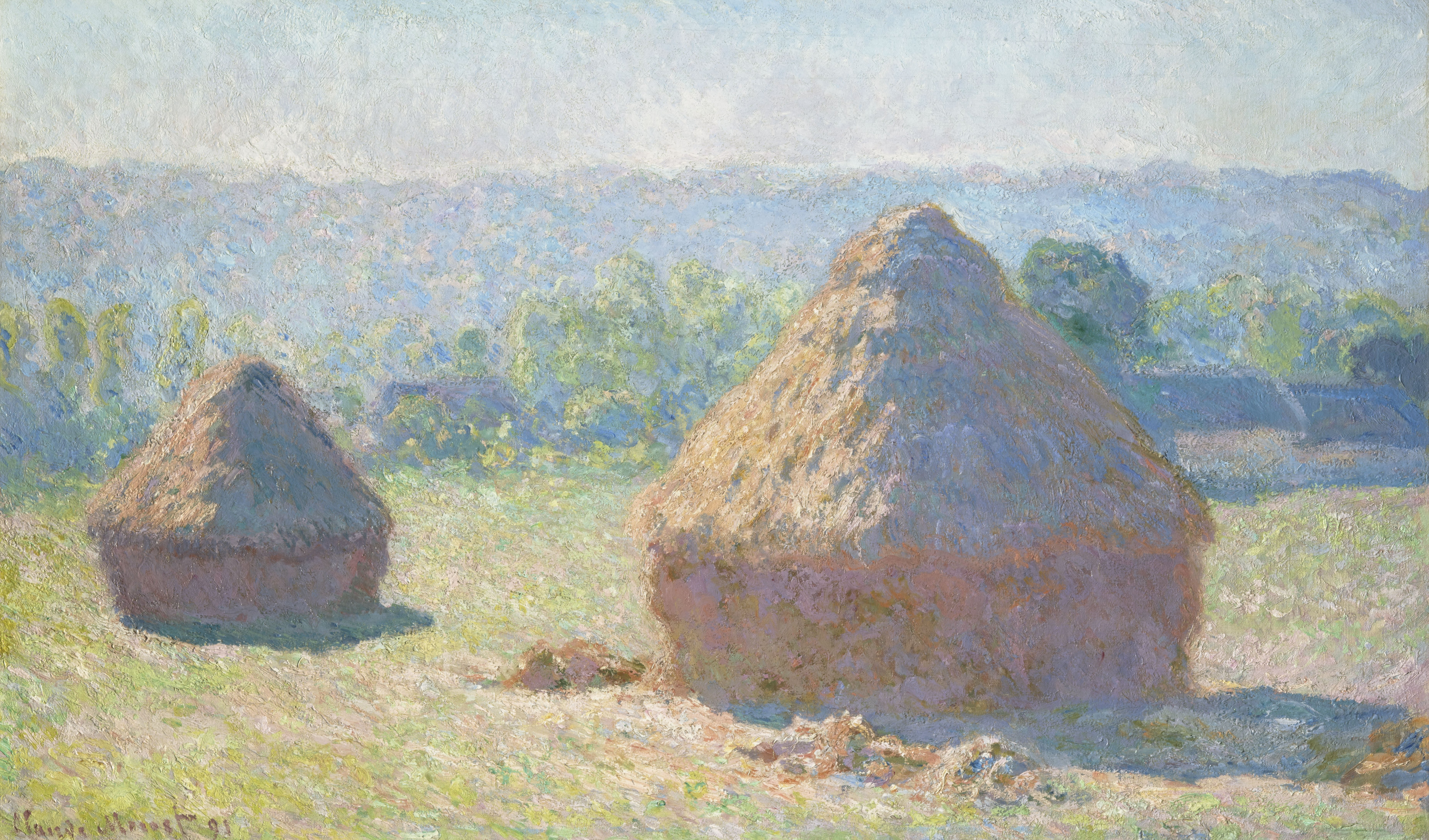
Seeing Claude Monet's Haystacks played a significant role in Kandinsky's move away from realistic art toward abstraction.

As well as his attendance of a performance of the opera, Lohengrin, by Richard Wagner, which incited him to connect color and sound, Kandinsky was also influenced by Helena Blavatsky and Rudolf Steiner, important figures in theosophy and anthroposophy, respectively. Their ideas would strongly shape Kandinsky's artistic concepts, such as "inner necessity" and "vibration" and his move towards abstract.

In 1896, Wassily Kandinsky moved to Munich, an artistic hub, particularly of Art Nouveau and Symbolism. There he studied under Anton Ažbe and later Franz von Stuck. Ažbe emphasized the importance of color, pushing his students to learn and apply color theory, a focus that remained evident in Kandinsky's art. Stuck, Kandinsky's second teacher, prioritized form, which shaped Kandinsky's early work, particularly in his woodcuts. After leaving Stuck's studio, Kandinsky co-founded the Phalanx in 1901, an association of artists that opposed conservative views in art. The group held a total of 12 exhibitions and opened an art school in which Kandinsky was a teacher, having taught to students such as Gabriele Münter.

== Description ==
The Blue Rider depicts a small figure in a cloak galloping through a meadow on a horse. The rider cloak is medium blue and the white horse has a red bridle. The rider, while prominent, is not clearly defined and is more a series of colors. The cloak casts a darker blue shadow in the hill, and in the foreground there are more amorphous blue shadows, alongside green grass. The background is composed by a blackening sky, white clouds and a vast forest stretching through the distance; the trees have golden leafs and white trunks, suggesting birches and that it's autumn.

=== Themes ===
The motif of the rider and horse symbolizes, for Kandinsky, the move beyond realism, that is, it was a spiritual force that would put an end to the philosophical view of materialism; a belief influenced by Theosophy. This motif also signified Kandinsky's resistance against standard aesthetic values, as well as the way for a more spiritual life through art. Kandinsky, inspired by German and Russian folklore, would often guise the rider as Saint George, the patron saint of Moscow. Kandinsky associated Saint George with the themes of apocalypse and salvation.

Blue, according to Kandinsky, was the color of spirituality, an "heavenly color", as it draws people toward the infinite, stirring a desire for the pure and the supernatural. Kandinsky would also associate color to music, specifically to the sounds of instruments; he would hear violoncellos and flutes when seeing dark and light blue, respectively.

== Interpretation ==
The painting has both impressionist and expressionist elements and marks Kandinsky's transition toward abstraction. Peter Selz, an art historian, considers the palette to be impressionist, but the choice of colors as symbolistic; further, Selz asserts that the stylized trees and clouds and the repetition of shapes, like the movement of the rider, are indicative of symbolism. Klaus Lankheit, an art historian, notes that the painting was also influenced by Jugendstil, the German counterpart of Art Nouveau.

The painting employs distortion, vibrant colors and short brushstrokes, creating a sense of motion and velocity. The rider and horse are rendered with minimal detail and appear as a sequence of colors rather than distinct forms, making the rider fade into the background; this reflects Kandinsky's growing interest in abstraction. Selz connotes the blue cloak to spirituality and serenity, while Roxana Preda, a literary scholar, suggests heaven and silence. Preda thinks that the image of the horse and rider also carries possible religious symbolism; specifically, the passage from Revelation 19:11, describing the faithful rider on a white horse, suggests a divine or apocalyptic interpretation. Sue Hubbard, an art critic, asserts the horse represents power, freedom, and pleasure.

The painting's imagery and symbolism have been associated with Saint George, interpreting the rider as a metaphorical figure combating the "dragon" of materialism. According to an interpretation, the visible figure of the rider serves as the signifier and the abstract figure of Saint George constitutes the signified. Hubbard alludes that the forest in the background, associated with the unconscious in German folklore, suggest a passage from the past, symbolized by the autumn landscape, into an uncertain future; leaving the work open to multiple interpretations.

Preda observes that the diagonal composition, moving from the bottom right to the top left, draws the viewer's gaze along the trajectory of the rider and horse toward distant, ambiguous spaces. According to her, this movement evokes an image of a romantic wanderer, as "striving alone against the elements, yet animated by a surety of purpose", mirroring Kandinsky's conception of the artist as a visionary figure. Preda posits that the indistinct forms invite multiple readings: the rider may be a fugitive, possibly sheltering a child, and the journey may represent either a means or an end in itself.

== Legacy ==
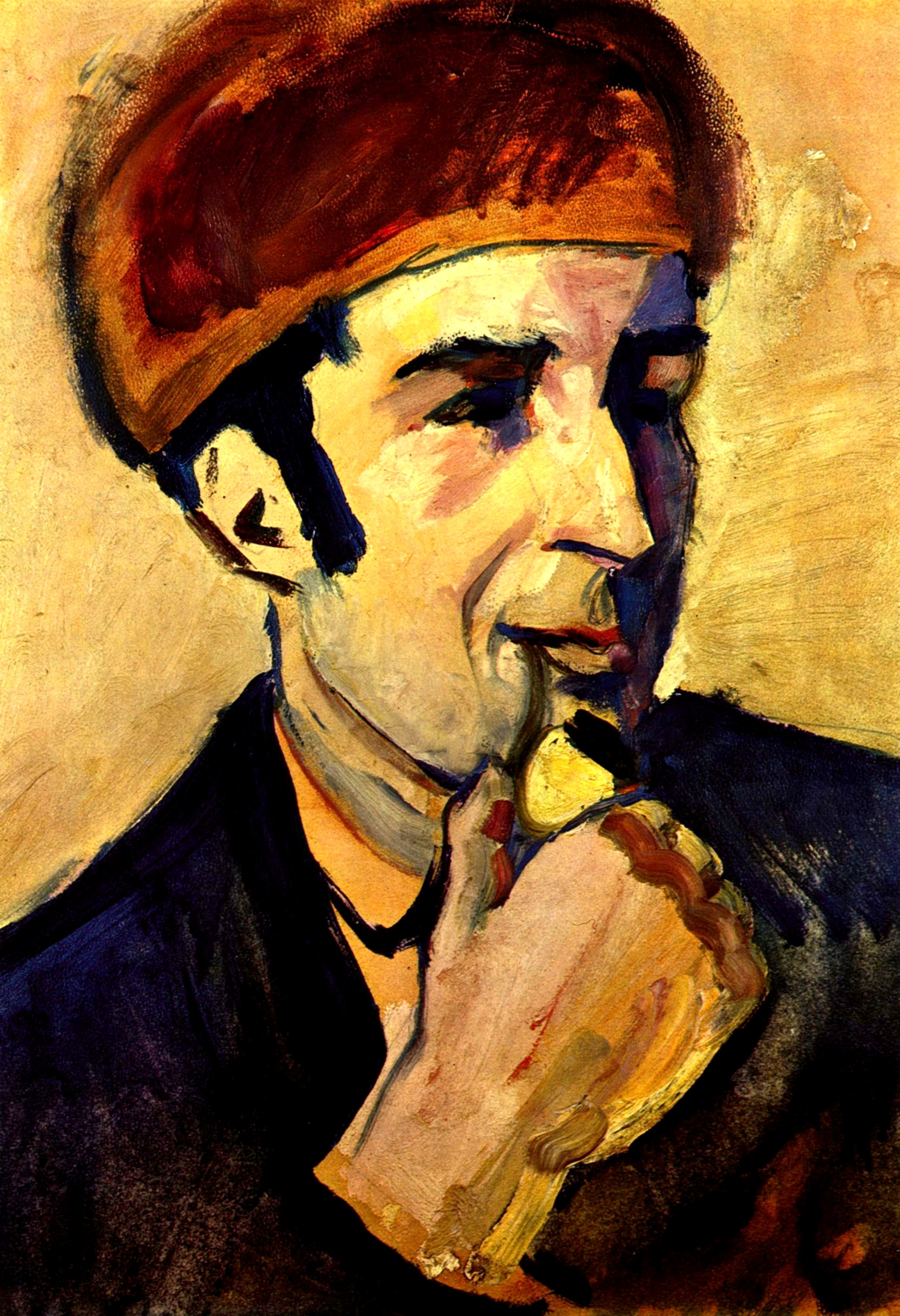
A portrait of Franz Marc by August Macke. Marc was one of the founders of Der Blaue Reiter and Macke was a member.

In December 1911, disagreements within the Neue Künstlervereinigung München (N.K.V.M)^{[note 1]} peaked when Kandinsky's Composition V was rejected from the group's third exhibition. As a result, Kandinsky and Franz Marc left the N.K.V.M and founded the Der Blaue Reiter, a group of expressionist artists united on the idea of expressing spirituality in art. The group's name may have been inspired by the painting The Blue Rider.^{[note 2]}

In May 1912, Kandinsky and Marc also published an almanac entitled with the same name, Der Blaue Reiter. The almanac was written by artists rather than critics and academics, moreover, it featured juxexpositions between art from different times and cultures. For example, it displayed van Gogh's Portrait of Dr. Gachet alongside Kuniyoshi's Two Chinese Warriors of the Han Dynast.

There we will place an Egyptian next to [a child's drawing], a Chinese alongside a Rousseau, a popular print next to a Picasso and much more of this sort!

— Wassily Kandinsky,

Many different artists showcased their work through Der Blaue Reiter's exhibitions and almanac, such as Paul Klee, August Macke, Alexej von Jawlensky, Marianne von Werefkin, and Gabriele Münter. The group was a pioneer in abstract art, and later influenced art movements, such as Dada, and the Bauhaus.

== Notes ==
A Munich-based expressionist art group founded in 1909.
Another version states that, while drinking coffee in Sindelsdorf, Germany, Marc and Kandinsky came to the name because both were fond of the color blue, Marc of horses and Kandinsky of riders, thus Der Blaue Reiter.

== See also ==
- List of paintings by Wassily Kandinsky

== Bibliography ==
- Magill, Frank (1999). Dictionary of World Biography. Routledge. ISBN 9781315793139.
- Aronov, Igor' (2003). "Kandinsky's First Symbolical Composition: Arrival of the Merchants". Experiment. 9: 137–176. doi:10.1163/2211730X03X00100.
- Dumez, Hervé (2024). "Le Libellio" [The Libellio] (PDF). Le Libellio d'AEGIS (in French). 20 (4). ISSN 2268-1167.
- Weiss, Peg (1995). Kandinsky and Old Russia: The Artist as Ethnographer and Shaman. Yale University Press. ISBN 9780300056471.
- Guedes, Ângelo (2011). Wassily Kandinsky: Do espiritual na arte e a proposta da sonoridade interior [Wassily Kandinsky: From the spiritual in art and the proposal of inner sonority] (Thesis). Mackenzie Presbyterian University.
- Pickstone, Charles (2011). "A theology of abstraction: Wassily Kandinsky's 'Concerning the Spiritual in Art'". Theology. 114: 32–41. doi:10.1177/0040571X10387346.
- Ashmore, Jerome (1979). "Vasily Kandinsky and His Idea of Ultimate Reality". Ultimate Reality and Meaning. 2 (3): 228–256. doi:10.3138/uram.2.3.228.
- Lindsay, Kenneth; Vergo, Peter (1994). Kandinsky: Complete Writings on Art. Da Capo Press.
- Düchting, Hajo (2001). Wassily Kandinsky, 1866-1944: A Revolution in Painting. Barns and Noble. ISBN 978-0760726815.
- McDonnell, Patricia (1989). ""Dictated by Life": Spirituality in the Art of Marsden Hartley and Wassily Kandinsky, 1910-1915". Archives of American Art. 29: 27–34. doi:10.1086/aaa.29.1_2.1557587.
- Tuchman, Maurice (1986). The Spiritual in Art: Abstract Painting 1890-1985. Abbeville Press. ISBN 978-0875871301.
- Coetzee, C. L. (1988). "Rudolf Steiner's philosophical influence on Kandinsky's aesthetic theory". South African Journal of Cultural History. 2 (2): 214–222.
- Cabeza de Vaca, Maria (2009). Surviving the Modernist Paradigm: a fresh approach to the singular art of Anglada-Camarasa, from Symbolism to Abstraction (Thesis). Oxford Brookes University.
- Weiss, Peg (1985). "Kandinsky and the Symbolist Heritage". Art Journal. 45 (2). Routledge: 137–145. doi:10.1080/00043249.1985.10792290.
- Eitner, Lorenz (1957). "Kandinsky in Munich". The Burlington Magazine. 99 (651): 193–199. ISSN 0007-6287. JSTOR 872196.
- Weiss, Peg (1979). Kandinsky in Munich : the formative Jugendstil years. Princeton University Press. ISBN 978-0-691-03934-3.
- Chilvers, Ian (2009). The Oxford Dictionary of Art and Artists (4 ed.). Oxford University Press. ISBN 978-0-19-953294-0.
- Preda, Roxana (2019). The Edinburgh Companion to Ezra Pound and the Arts. Vol. 1. Edinburgh University Press. ISBN 978-1-4744-2917-7. JSTOR 10.3366/j.ctv2f4vfks.
- Selz, Peter (2023). German Expressionist Painting. University of California Press. doi:10.2307/jj.2711576. ISBN 978-0-520-34150-0.
- Liu, Gengmeng (2024). Proceedings of the 2024 8th International Seminar on Education, Management and Social Sciences (ISEMSS 2024). Atlantis Press. ISBN 978-2-38476-297-2.
- C.S., Christensen (2022). "Wassily Kandinsky and birth of abstract art in Munich in the 1910s". Studia Humanitatis.
- Ferreira, Lennon (2018). O visível além do visível : os espaço e seus desdobramentos na produção do Cavaleiro Azul [The visible beyond the visible: the space and its developments in the production of The Blue Rider] (Thesis) (in Portuguese). University of Brasilia.
- Vieira, Renata (2009). A essência das pinturas de kandinsky [The essence of the paintings of kandinsky] (Thesis) (in Portuguese). University of France – via Universidade Cruzeiro do Sul.
- Bätschmann, Oskar (2016). The form of color: Kandinsky's revival of the arts (Thesis). Heidelberg University. doi:10.11588/artdok.00009170.
- Schueler, Vera (2024). "Paths to The Abstraction: Kandinsky and Rothko". Sotheby's Institute of Art.
- Price, Dorothy (2020). German Expressionism: Der Blaue Reiter and its legacies. Manchester University Press. ISBN 978-1-5261-2163-9.
- Vezin, Annette (1996). Kandinsky and der Blaue Reiter. Terrail. ISBN 978-2879390406.
- Becks-Malorny, Ulrike (1999). Wassily Kandinsky, 1866-1944: the journey to abstraction. Taschen. ISBN 978-3-8228-2349-1.
- Rhodes, Colin (2025). "Expressionist Women Before and After the Blue Rider". Art History. 48: 192–201. doi:10.1093/arthis/ulaf004.
- Jooss, Birgit (1998). Der "Blaue Reiter" [The "Blue Rider"]. Heidelberg University.
- Gárcia-Bermejo, José (2005). Wassily Kandinsky (in Spanish). Polígrafa. ISBN 8434310759.
- Lankheit, Klaus (1974). The Documents of 20th-century Art: The Blaue Reiter Almanac. The Viking Press. ISBN 978-0500610053.
