= Composition VI =

1913 painting by Wassily Kandinsky

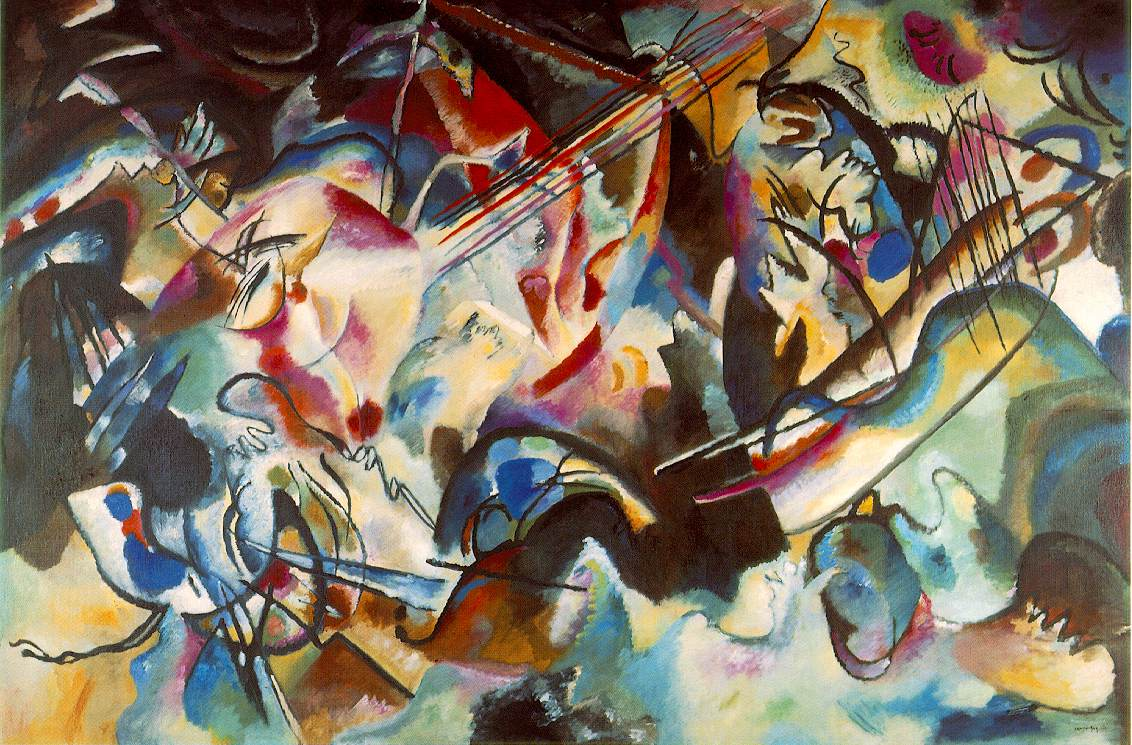
- Artist: Wassily Kandinsky
- Year: 1913
- Medium: oil on canvas
- Dimensions: 195 cm × 300 cm (77 in × 120 in)
- Location: Hermitage Museum; Saint Petersburg

Composition VI is a 1913 oil painting on canvas by the Russian artist Wassily Kandinsky, now in the Hermitage Museum, in Saint Petersburg.

The result of 24 studies, it took the painter eight months to complete the large painting. He wanted to depict a flood, a baptism and the theme of destruction and rebirth. His assistant, Gabriele Münter - with whom he had a professional and personal relationship between 1902 and 1916 - advised him to break free from the initial outline and think about the German word 'Überflut' (flood) and the acoustic sensations it suggested to him. Kandinsky finished the painting within three days of that suggestion, intoning the word 'uberflut' for those whole three days.

== Exposition ==
Composition VI was the artist's main entry for the Erster Deutscher Herbstsalon (First German Autumn Salon), organized in 1913 in Berlin by Herwarth Walden, alongside painters such as August Macke and Franz Marc.

== See also ==
- List of paintings by Wassily Kandinsky
- 1913 in art
