= Simple Complexity =

1939 painting by Wassily Kandinsky

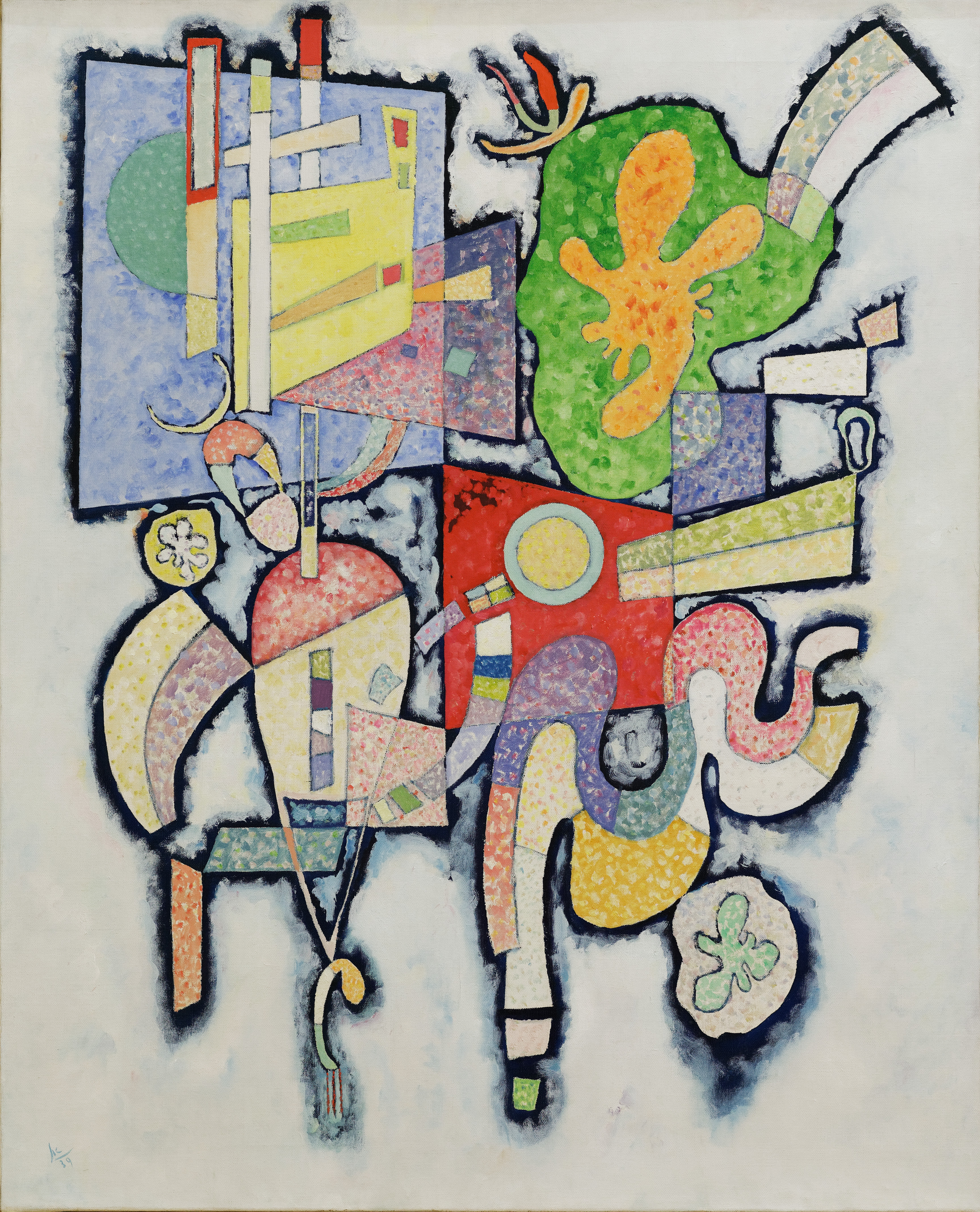

Simple Complexity or Ambiguity is an abstract 1939 oil on canvas painting, produced by Wassily Kandinsky in Neuilly-sur-Seine in France. It was given to the Musée National d'Art Moderne in Paris by its friends' association in 1959 but has been loaned to the Museum of Grenoble since 1988.

== See also ==
- List of paintings by Wassily Kandinsky
