= Landscape with Red Spots =

1913 painting by Wassily Kandinsky

Landscape with Red Spots No 2
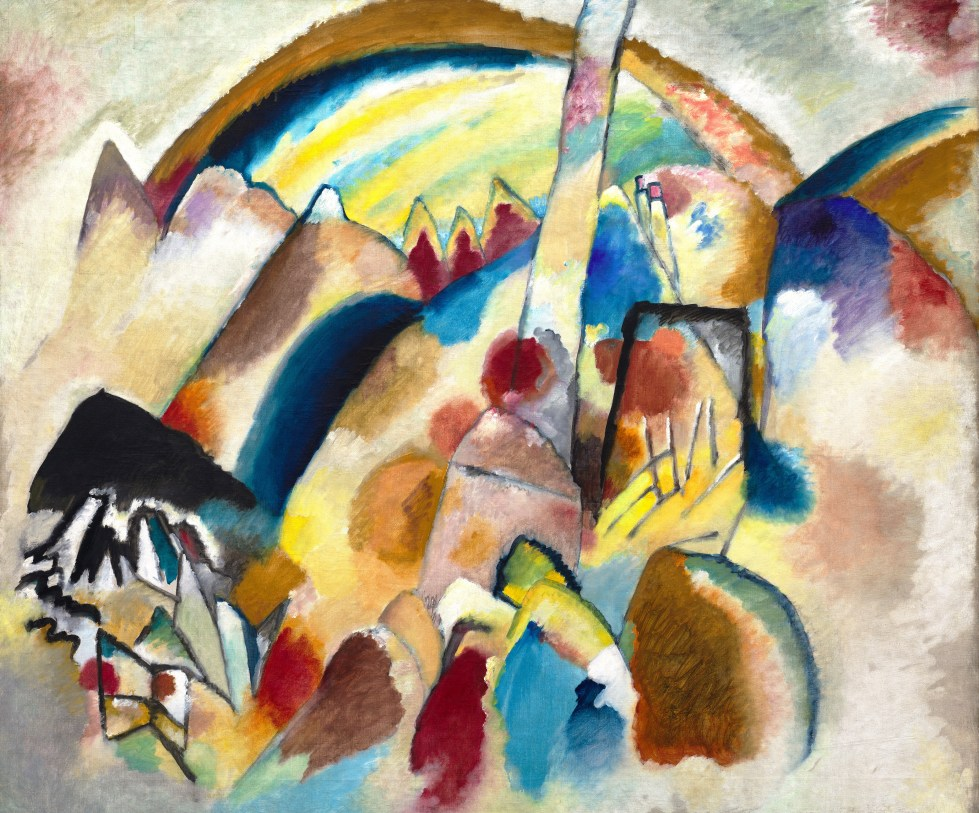
- Artist: Wassily Kandinsky
- Year: 1913
- Medium: Oil on canvas
- Dimensions: 117.5 cm × 140 cm (46.3 in × 55 in)
- Location: Peggy Guggenheim Collection; Venice

Landscape with Red Spots was the name given to each of two successive oil paintings produced in Bavaria in 1913 by the Russian émigré painter Wassily Kandinsky. The first is now in the Museum Folkwang, in Essen, Germany. The second, known as Landscape with Red Spots, No 2 (see picture at right), is in the Peggy Guggenheim Collection, in Venice.

Between 1909 and the beginning of World War I, Kandinsky and his female companion, the painter Gabriele Münter, spent their summers in Murnau am Staffelsee on the edge of the Bavarian Alps. The village church of St Nikolaus and its prominent round tower feature several times in landscape paintings executed by the artist during his time there. As Kandinsky's style evolved over the period into abstract expressionism the images of the church and its surroundings became gradually less figurative and more abstract.

== Description ==
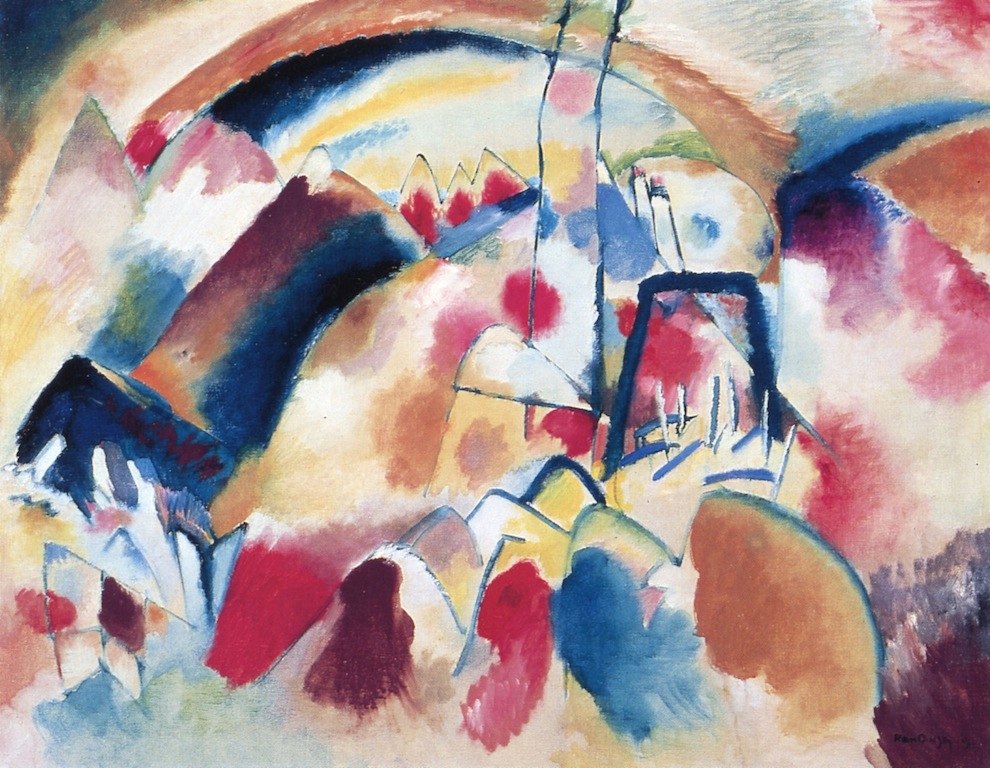
Landscape with Red Spots (No 1), 78 x 100 cm, Museum Folkwang

In both the pictures concerned here, which are very similar in composition but different in size, the church tower has been elongated as a geometrical shape to the very edge of the canvas and the mountains behind reduced to monochrome triangles. The eponymous red spots are at the foot of the tower.

The earlier work (see left) was acquired soon after completion by the poet Karl Wolfskehl, before being acquired by the Museum Folkwang in 1962.

== See also ==
- List of paintings by Wassily Kandinsky
- 1913 in art
