= Upward (Kandinsky) =

1929 painting by Wassily Kandinsky

- Empor (German)
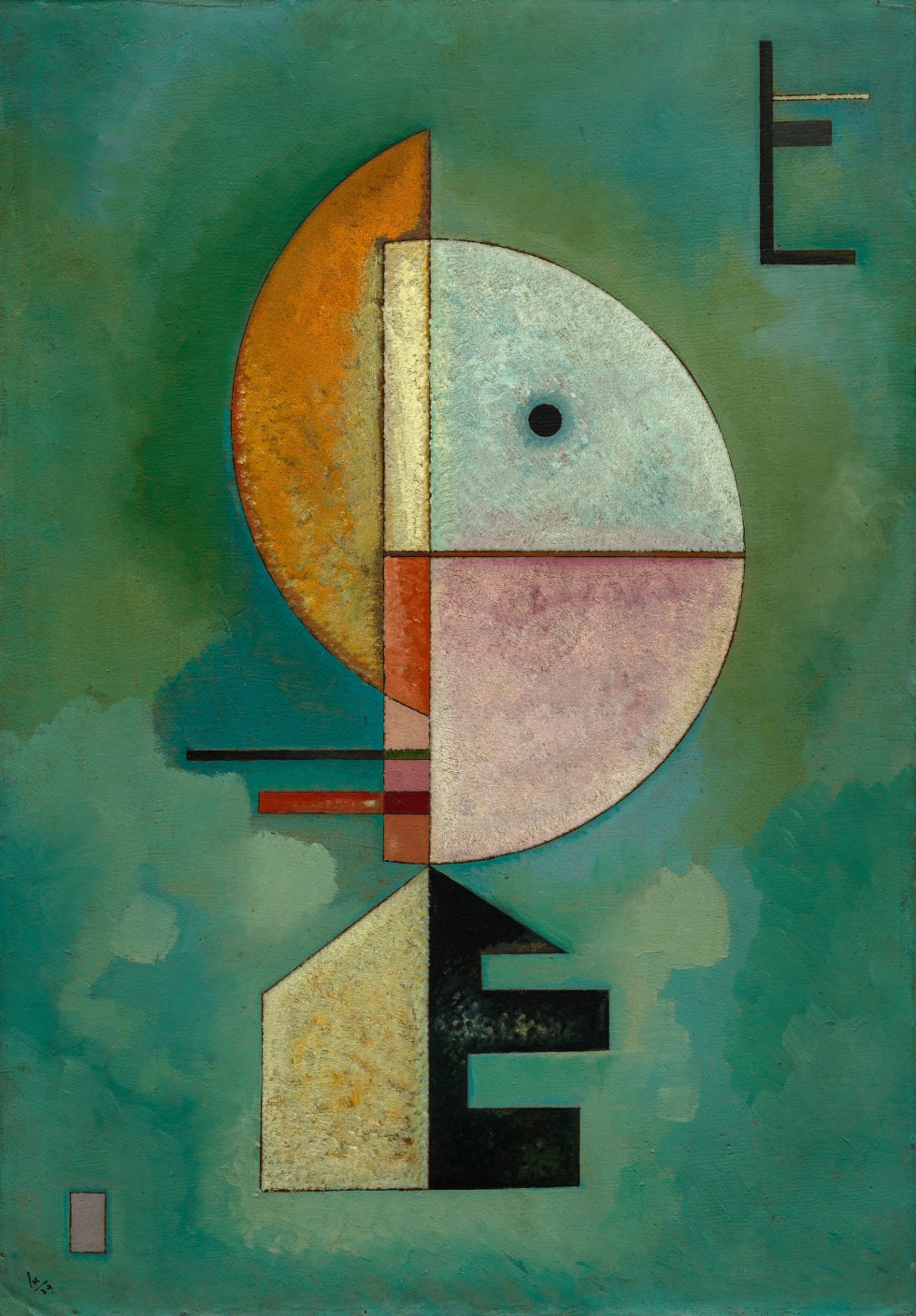
- Artist: Wassily Kandinsky
- Year: 1929
- Medium: Oil on cardboard
- Dimensions: 70 cm × 49 cm (28 in × 19 in)
- Location: Peggy Guggenheim Collection, Venice

Upward (German: Empor) is an oil on cardboard painting created in 1929 by the Russian abstract painter Wassily Kandinsky. Painted at a time when Kandinsky was teaching art at the Bauhaus in Dessau, Germany, it now forms part of the Peggy Guggenheim Collection in the Palazzo Venier dei Leoni, Venice, Italy.

== Description ==
The painting depicts a set of geometric shapes assembled to suggest upward rising energy. In both the base of the central motif and in the upper right hand corner can be seen the capital letter E, possibly representing the initial letter of the painting's German name Empor. A dot and horizontal line in the main semicircle suggest a human face; preparatory drawings indicate that these were late additions. The painting is reminiscent of the style of Paul Klee, who was Kandinsky's friend and colleague at the Bauhaus.

== See also ==
- List of paintings by Wassily Kandinsky
