= Auf Weiss II (Sur blanc II) =

1923 painting by Wassily Kandinsky

- On White II (English)
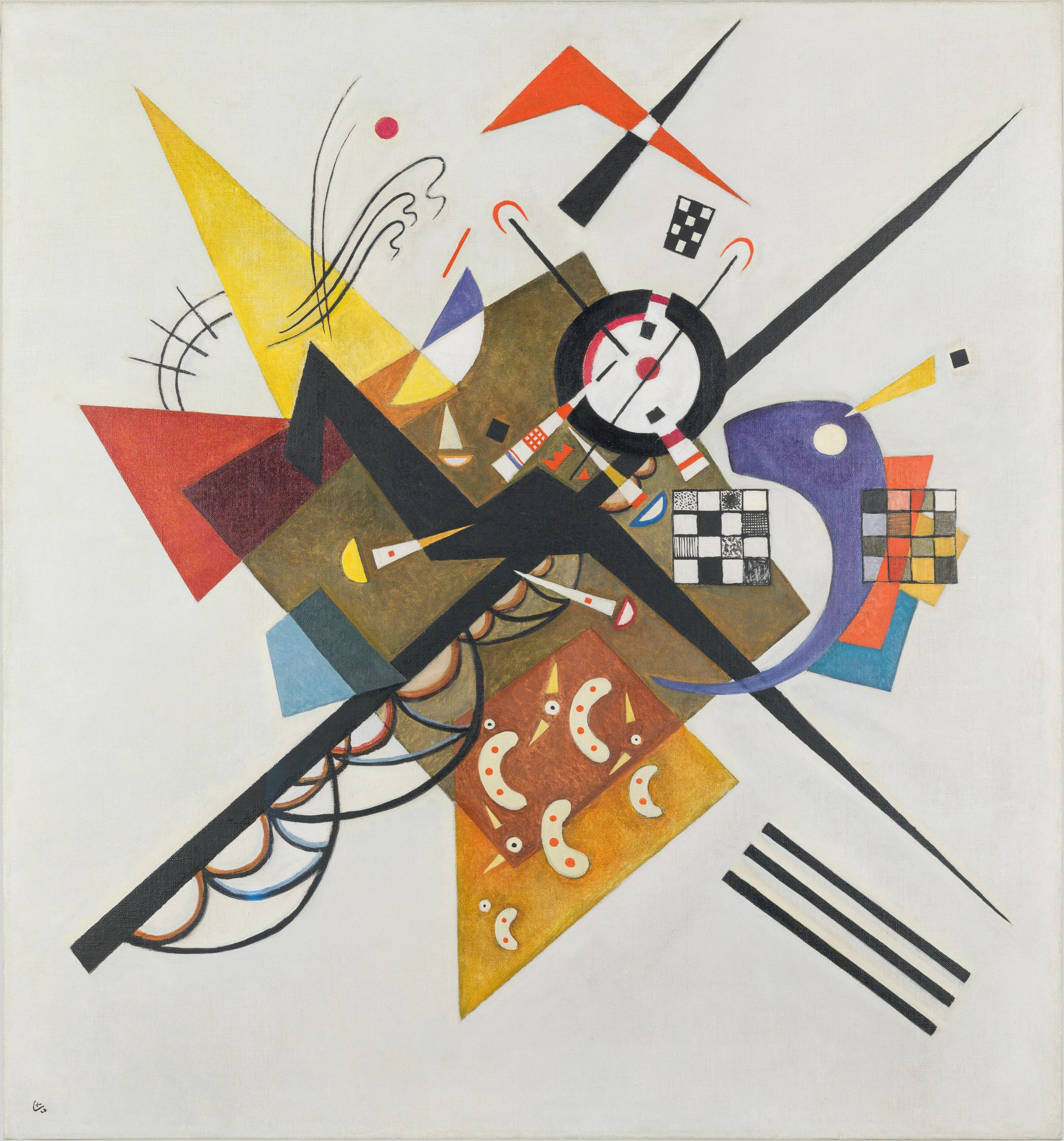
- Artist: Wassily Kandinsky
- Year: 1923
- Medium: oil on canvas
- Dimensions: 105 cm × 98 cm (41 in × 39 in)
- Location: Musée National d'Art Moderne; Paris

Auf Weiss II (Sur blanc II), in English: On White II, is a 1923 oil-on-canvas painting by Russian painter Wassily Kandinsky. It was created when the artist was a teacher at the Bauhaus in Weimar. The painting initially hung in the dining room of Wassily and Nina Kandinsky's apartment at Bauhaus Dessau. Since 1976, as a gift from Nina Kandinsky, it has been in the collection of the Musée National d'Art Moderne, in Paris.

== Description and analysis ==
The composition of the painting consists mainly of diagonals. Geometric shapes such as lines, circles, semicircles, triangles, squares, a checkerboard pattern and a black area in the center of the crossing figures, as well as a larger brownish-gray trapezoid, are reminiscent of the Russian painter Kazimir Malevich and his suprematist style, which Kandinsky understood and admired. The white background of the painting creates the impression that the geometric shapes and the main axes formed by them, with the emblems of Suprematism at the center of composition, are floating freely in an endless space and thus appear weightless. At this time, Kandinsky often integrated the trapeze into his paintings. Kandinsky mainly used the primary colors, which, however, also produce other shades of color through superimposition. The motif of elongated, sharpened lance-like elements in the shape of St. Andrew's cross appears several times in his work and refers to the dragon slayer Saint George. He had painted this motif several times since the 1910s and they became more abstract with time.

On December 22, 1922, Kandinsky made a preliminary study in watercolor and China ink on paper measuring 45.4 × 40.4 cm, now also in the Musée National d'Art Moderne, which, although smaller, has the same forms as in the final execution. Kandinsky then completed the painting between February and April 1923. The almost square canvas is a reworking of an older painting from 1920, also with a diagonal composition. As early as 1910 he was painting lines and colors that appear to form a tangle, but still with other elements, like the spear of Saint George. The diagonals are in tension with each other, because Kandinsky saw his work as a struggle against the initially "stubborn nature" of the canvas, where the brush "conquers the wild maiden nature like a European colonist".

== Reception ==
In this image, art historian Vanessa Morisset sees a whirlpool of centripetal forces emanating from its surface. The white, understood as clarity and simplicity, creates the feeling that the "struggle with the canvas" of Kandinsky had succeeded.

According to art historian Macha Daniel, the center of the painting is dominated by a massive form that seems to ignore gravity. In Kandinsky's earlier works, landscape elements such as conifers and rocky peaks were present, but here they were replaced by triangles and sharp jags.

== See also ==
- List of paintings by Wassily Kandinsky
