= Improvisation No. 30 (Cannons) =

1911–1913 painting by Wassily Kandinsky

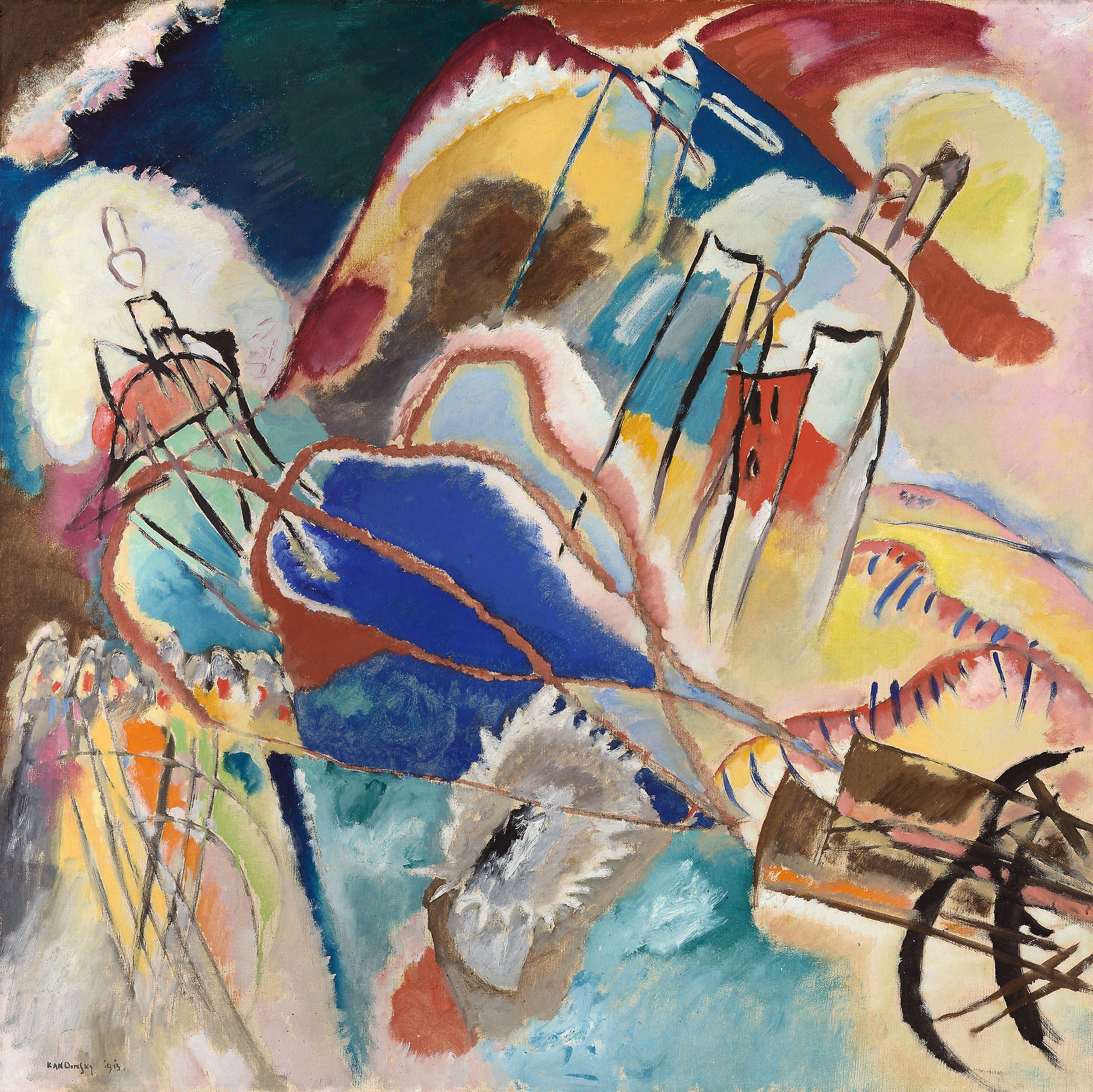
- Artist: Vasily Kandinsky
- Year: 1911–1913
- Medium: Oil on Canvas
- Movement: Abstract Impressionism
- Dimensions: 111 cm × 111.3 cm (44 in × 43.8 in)
- Location: The Art Institute of Chicago, Chicago

Improvisation No. 30 (Cannons) is an oil painting executed between 1911 and 1913 by the abstract painter Vasily Kandinsky. The work was donated by the Chicago lawyer Arthur Jerome Eddy to the Art Institute of Chicago, in whose permanent collection it still remains.

== Interpretation ==
The artwork, which was painted in Germany in the years leading up to World War I, depicts a world on the verge of war and calamity. The cannons of the title can be readily discerned, as well as buildings and a small group of people (at left).

== See also ==
- List of paintings by Wassily Kandinsky
