= Three Elements =

1925 painting by Wassily Kandinsky

- German: Drei Elemente, French: Trois éléments
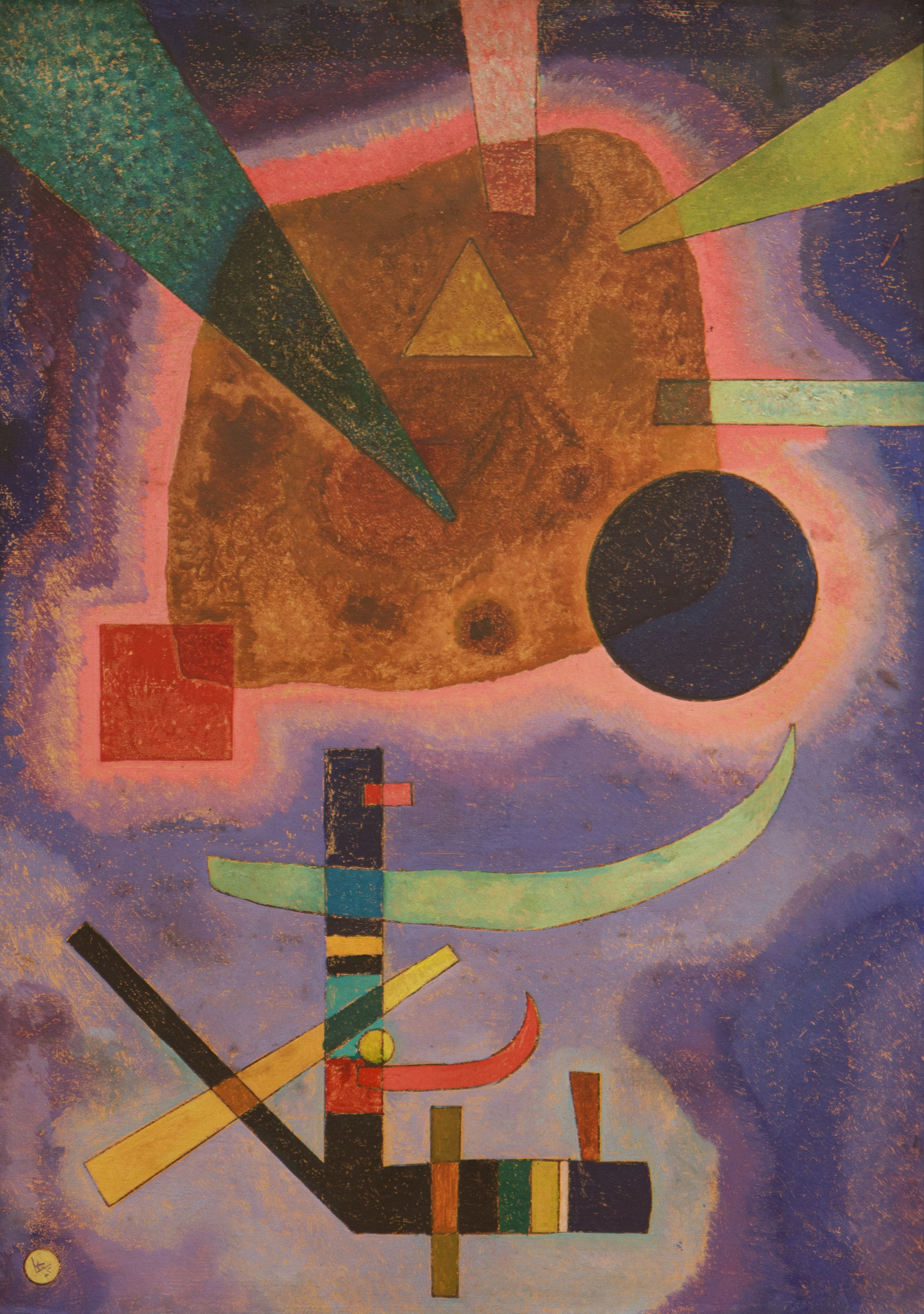
- Artist: Wassily Kandinsky
- Year: 1925
- Catalogue: 295
- Medium: oil painting on cardboard
- Movement: Abstract art
- Subject: a red square, a yellow triangle and a blue circle among coulours and shapes
- Dimensions: 68 cm × 48 cm (27 in × 19 in); also given as 69.5 × 49.5 cm (27.4 × 19.5 in)
- Location: Musée d'Art moderne et contemporain, Strasbourg
- Accession: 2002

Three Elements is a March 1925 abstract painting by the Russian artist Wassily Kandinsky.

== History ==
Kandinsky presented it to his nephew Alexandre Kojève, in whose family it remained after Kojève's death in 1968. The painting was bought in 2002 from Kojève's widow, Nina Ivanoff (also spelled Ivanov) and is now in the Musée d'Art moderne et contemporain of Strasbourg, France. Its inventory number is 55.002.3.1.

== See also ==
- List of paintings by Wassily Kandinsky
- 1925 in art
