= Phalanx (art group) =

Association of artists from Munich

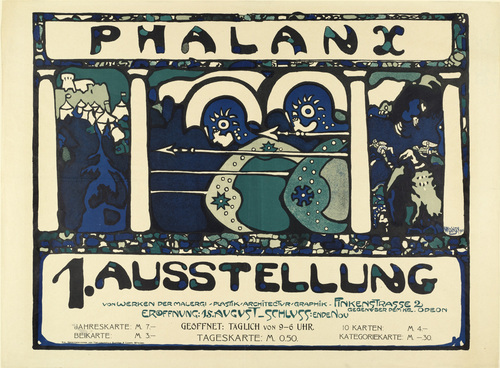
The first Phalanx exhibition poster in Jugendstil pictorial style, by Kandinsky (Städtische Galerie im Lenbachhaus, Munich)

Phalanx was an association of artists formed in Munich in 1901.

== Background ==
The Phalanx group were opposed to old fashioned and conservative viewpoints in art. Founding members were Wassily Kandinsky, Rolf Niczky, Waldemar Hecker, and Wilhelm Hüsgen. Kandinsky was elected president of the association and also became the director of the Phalanx School of Painting.

The group lasted two years closing in 1903 and broke up in 1904.

== Characteristics ==
The group organized twelve exhibitions between 1901 and 1904 which in addition to those of its members, featured works by Claude Monet, Jugendstil (Art Nouveau) artists, Symbolists and Post-Impressionist artists Paul Signac, Félix Vallotton and Henri de Toulouse-Lautrec.

== Phalanx members ==
Phalanx was where Kandinsky met Gabriele Münter, an art student at the school. She was to become his pupil, intimate companion, and critic until they separated in 1914.
