= Composition VII =

1913 painting by Wassily Kandinsky

- Artist: Wassily Kandinsky
- Year: 1913
- Medium: oil on canvas
- Dimensions: 200.6 cm × 302.2 cm (79.0 in × 119.0 in)
- Location: Tretyakov Gallery; Moscow

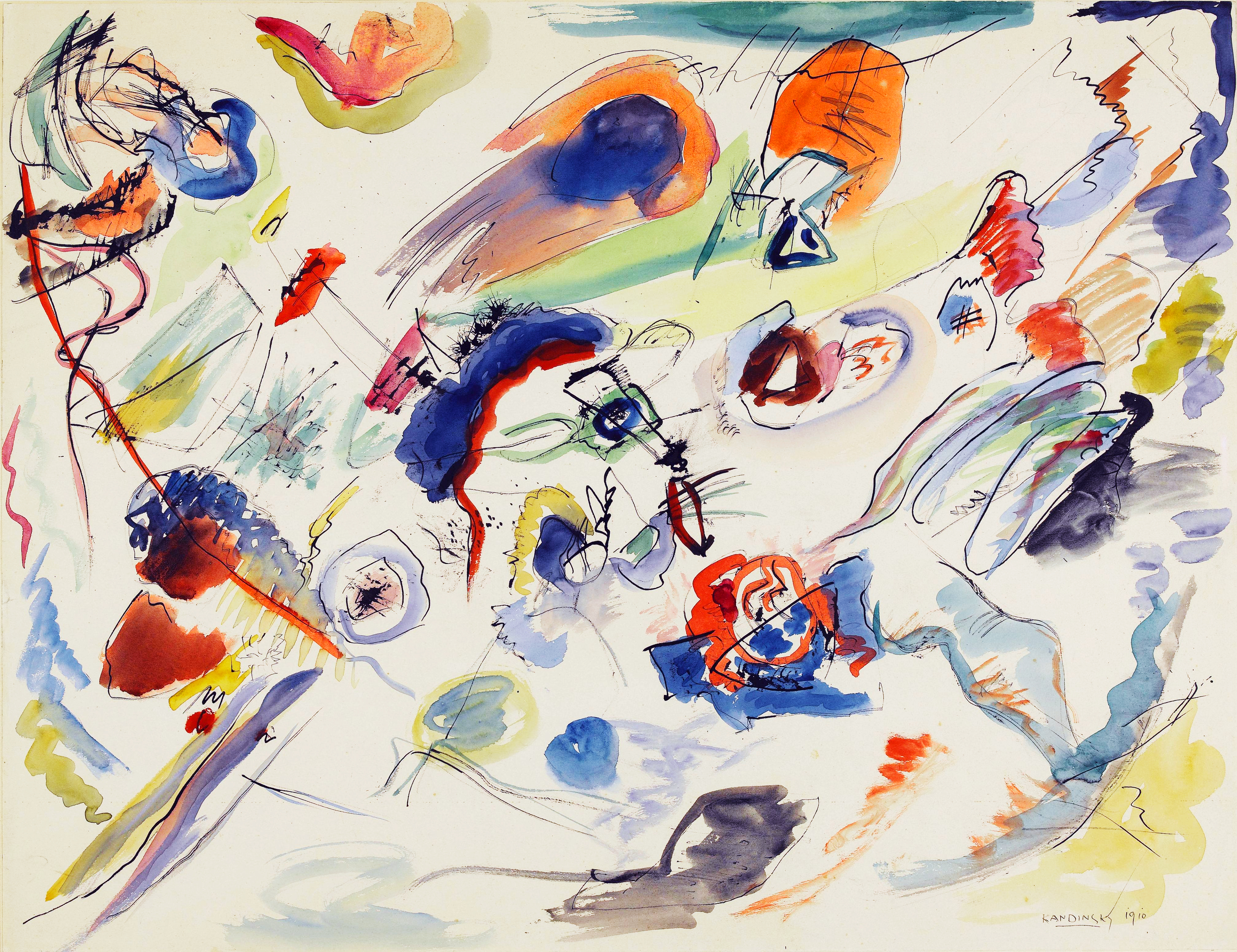
Wassily Kandinsky, 1913, Untitled (Study for Composition VII, Première abstraction), Musée National d'Art Moderne, Centre Georges Pompidou, Paris

Composition VII is a 1913 abstract oil painting by Russian-born painter Wassily Kandinsky. It is in the collection of the Tretyakov Gallery, in Moscow. Art historians have concluded that the work is a combination of the themes of Resurrection, Judgment Day, the Flood and the Garden of Eden.

== Preliminary watercolor ==
Kandinsky's preliminary study was his first abstract watercolor. Untitled (Study for Composition VII, Première abstraction) was painted in 1913, and is the first of Kandinsky's "Compositions" and "Improvisations" series that began to emerge during his Blue Rider Period. Though the work is dated 1910, art historians believe the date is apocryphal, and that Kandinsky dated the work in 1913.

== Context ==
The work demonstrates characteristics of Cubism and Futurism and is similar to the abstract work of Robert Delaunay, Francis Picabia, František Kupka, Léopold Survage, Piet Mondrian, and Hilma af Klint.

== See also ==
- List of paintings by Wassily Kandinsky
