= Composition X =

1939 painting by Wassily Kandinsky

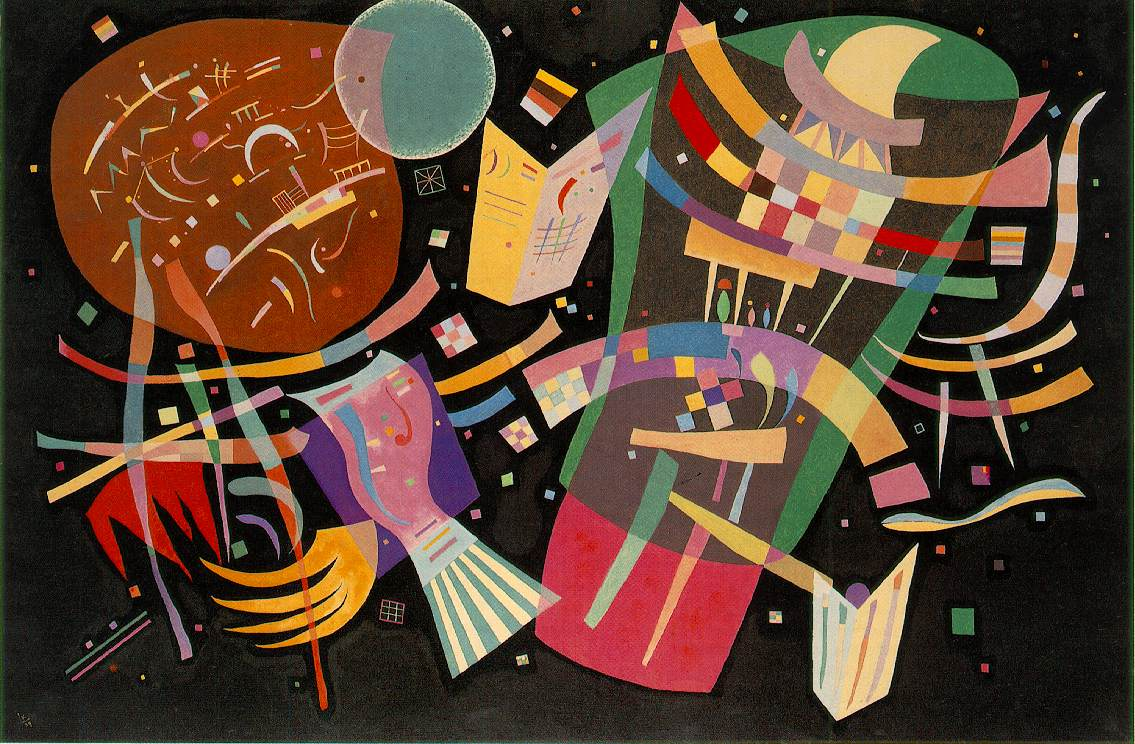
- Artist: Wassily Kandinsky
- Year: 1939
- Medium: oil on canvas
- Dimensions: 130 cm × 195 cm (51 in × 77 in)
- Location: Kunstsammlung Nordrhein-Westfalen; Düsseldorf

Composition X is an abstract oil painting created in 1939 by the Russian émigré artist Wassily Kandinsky, then living near Paris. It is part of the collection of the Kunstsammlung Nordrhein-Westfalen in Düsseldorf, Germany.

== Compositions ==
Kandinsky compared abstract painting to the process of musical composition, and called his major conceptual works "compositions", as opposed to his lesser "improvisations". Composition X is the last of the ten compositions he painted during his lifetime (he was 73 at the time). Unusually for Kandinsky, who attached spiritual importance to color and geometric forms, the predominant color of the painting is black, which for him evoked the closure and end of things. On the black background float various geometric shapes, whose meaning is left to the viewer's appreciation.

== See also ==
- List of paintings by Wassily Kandinsky
