= Ein Zentrum (A Centre) =

1922/1923 painting by Wassily Kandinsky

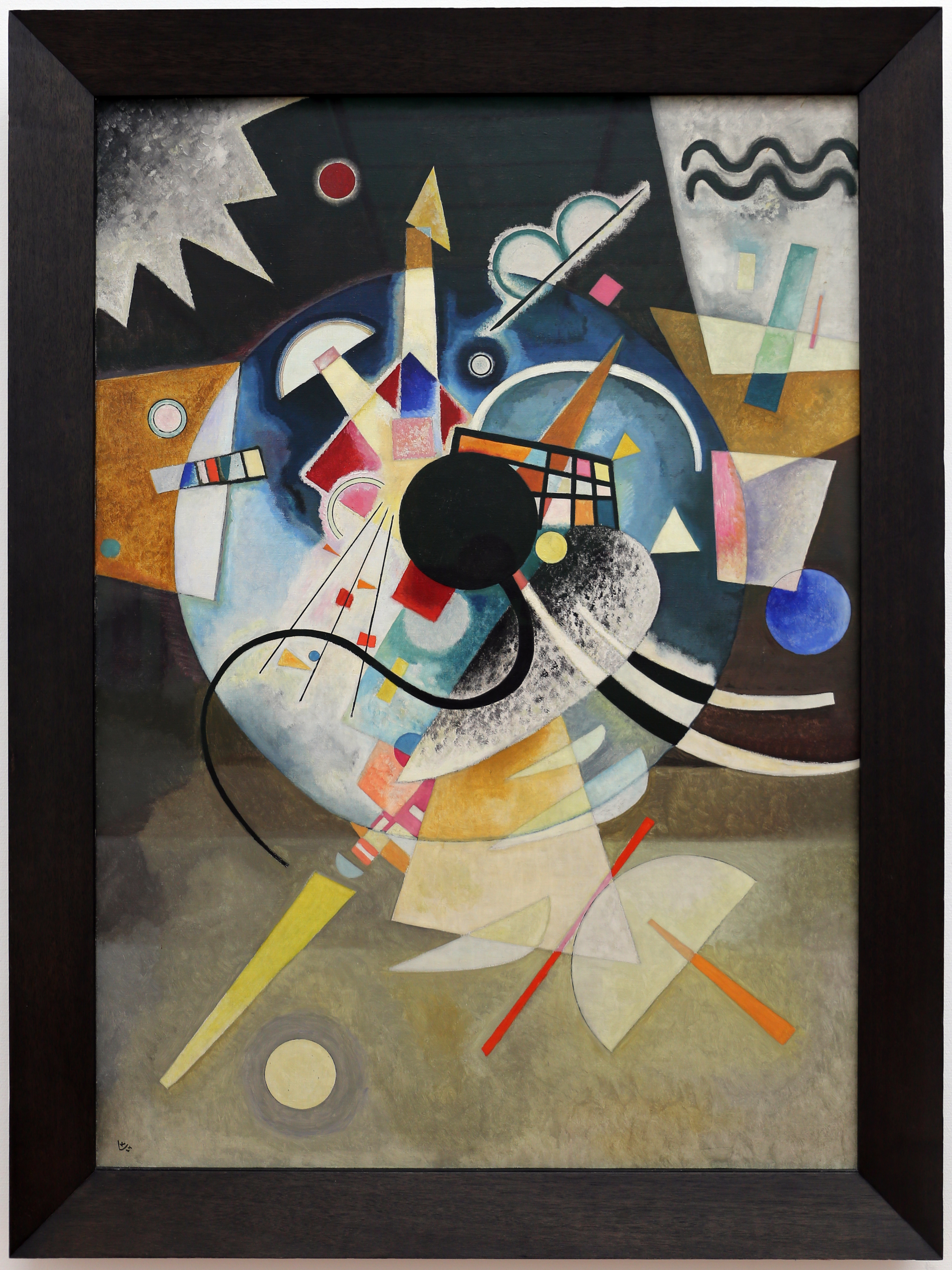
- Year: c. 1922
- Medium: oil paint, canvas
- Dimensions: 140.7 cm (55.4 in) × 99.8 cm (39.3 in)
- Location: Kunstmuseum Den Haag
- Accession: 0334730

Ein Zentrum (A Centre) is a painting by the Russian abstract artist Wassily Kandinsky. It was painted in 1922 or 1923, around 12 years after Kandinsky has established the Der Blaue Reiter movement. It hangs in the Kunstmuseum, in Den Haag, Netherlands.

The painting is actually part of the Guggenheim Collection in New York. However, in 1975 the Kunstmuseum and the Guggenheim agreed a long-term exchange loan - A Centre and Painting with White Form went to the Kunstmuseum, while two early Piet Mondriaan works (Still Life with Gingerpot I and II) went to the Guggenheim.
