= Gabriele Münter =

German painter (1877–1962)

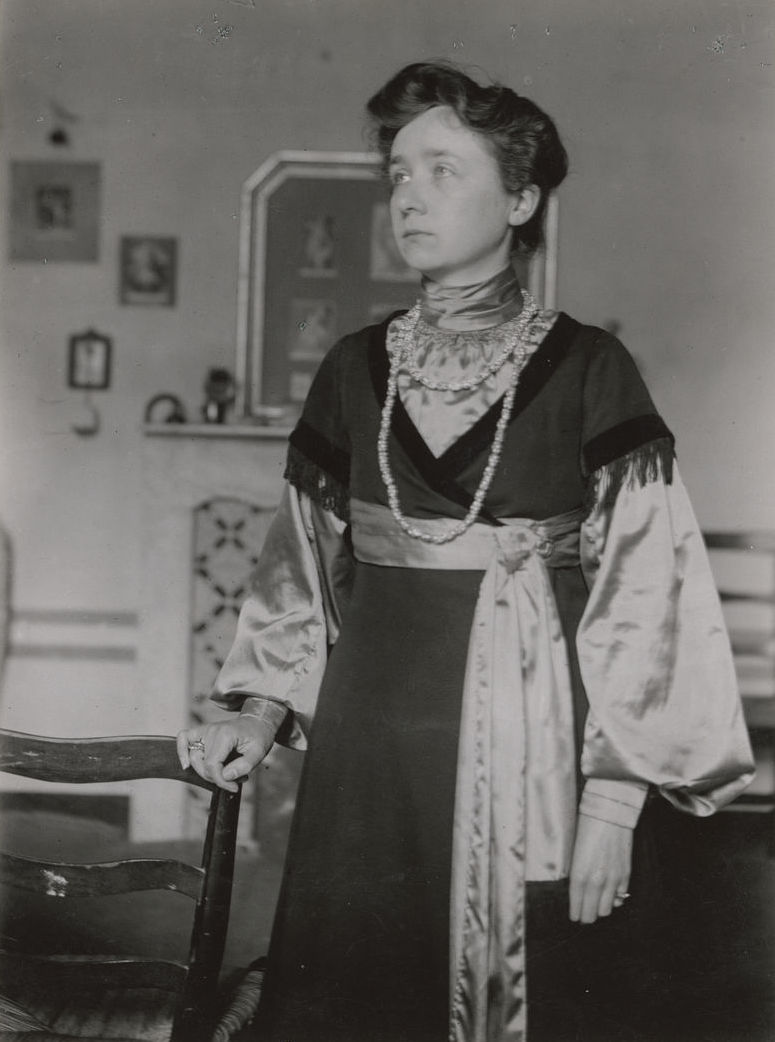
- Münter, c. 1903
- Born: 19 February 1877; Berlin, German Empire
- Died: 19 May 1962 (aged 85); Murnau am Staffelsee, Bavaria, West Germany
- Known for: Painting
- Movement: Expressionism

Gabriele Münter (19 February 1877 – 19 May 1962) was a German expressionist painter who was at the forefront of the Munich avant-garde in the early 20th century. She studied and lived with the painter Wassily Kandinsky and was a founding member of the expressionist group Der Blaue Reiter.

== Early life ==
Münter was born to upper middle-class parents in Berlin on 19 February 1877. The youngest of four siblings, she had two brothers and a sister. In 1884, when she was seven years old, the family settled in Koblenz.

Münter began to draw as a child, and her family supported her desire to become an artist with a private tutor. After her father died in 1886, her mother arranged for her to receive formal drawing lessons through her school in Koblenz. In 1897, at the age of twenty, she received artistic training in the Düsseldorf studio of artist Ernst Bosch and later at the Damenschule (Women's School) with artist Willy Spatz.

By the time she was 21 years old, both of her parents had died and she was living at home with no occupation. That year, in 1898, she decided to take a trip to the United States with her sister to visit her extended family. Both girls had inherited a large amount of money, allowing them to live freely and independently. They stayed in America for more than two years, mainly in the states of Texas, Arkansas, and Missouri; six sketchbooks survive from Münter's period in America, depicting images of people, plants and landscapes. During the trip she also took photographs with a portable box camera (Kodak Bull's Eye No. 2) that she received as a present on her twenty-second birthday.

Her childhood and early adulthood greatly impacted her future artistic career. She had a free life unconstrained by convention. Münter studied woodcut techniques, sculpture, painting, and printmaking.

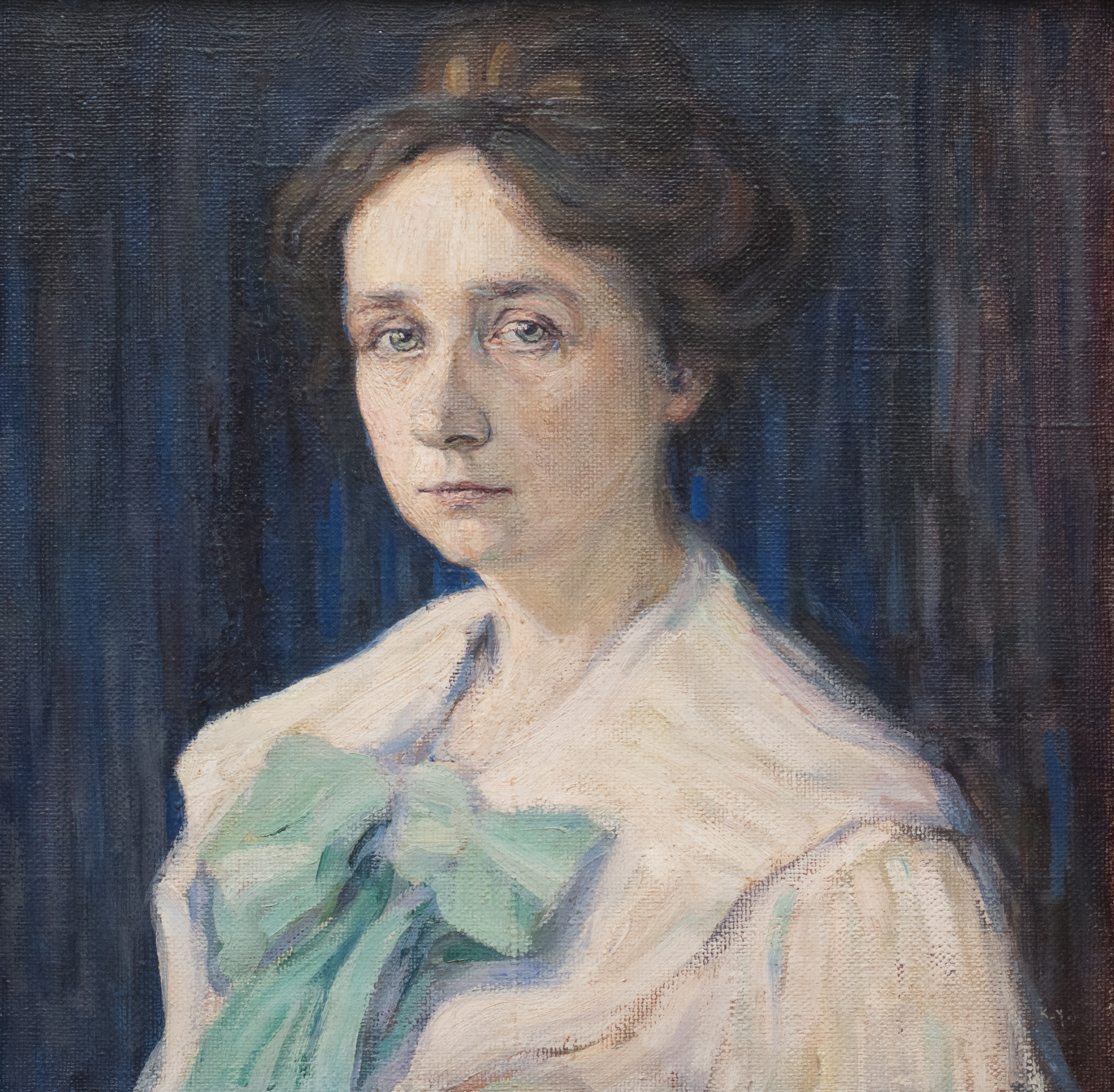
Münter portrayed by Kandinsky

In 1901, she attended the beginners' classes of Maximilian Dasio at the Damenakademie (Women's Academy) of the Münchener Künstlerinnenverein (Munich Women Artists's Association). Münter then studied at the Phalanx School in Munich, an avant-garde institution founded by Russian artist, Wassily Kandinsky. There, she attended sculpture courses taught by Wilhelm Hüsgen.

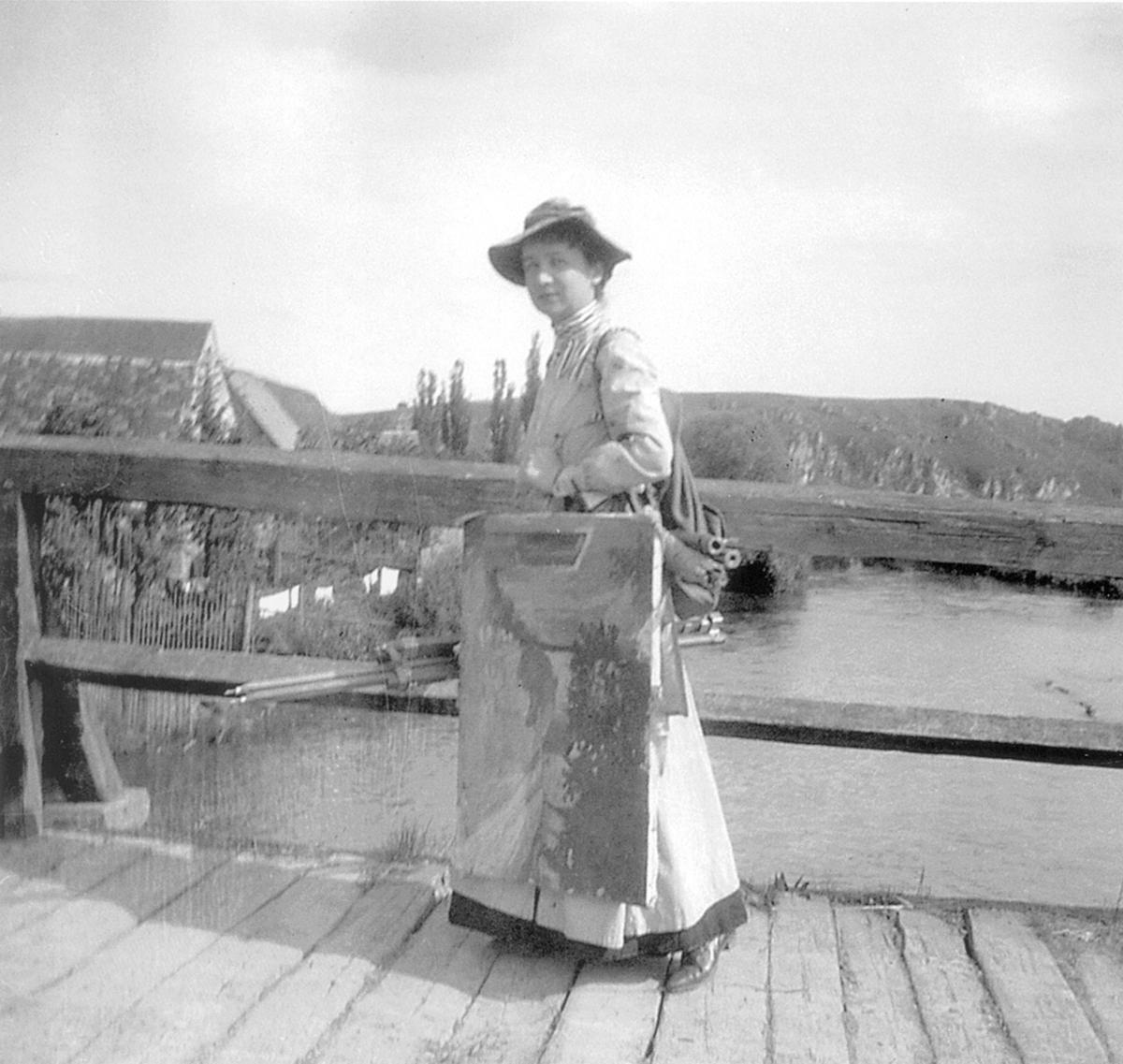
Münter in Kallmünz in 1903, carrying a freshly painted canvas

Münter studied outside the official art academies in Munich and Düsseldorf, because these were closed to women. At the Phalanx School, Münter was introduced to Post-Impressionism and the marking techniques of a palette knife and a brush. Her vivid colors and bold outlines were somewhat derived from Gauguin and from practitioners of fauvism, whom she admired. Along with this, Münter was inspired by Bavarian folk art, particularly the technique of reverse-glass painting (Hinterglasmalerei in German).

Soon after she began taking classes, Münter became professionally involved with Kandinsky. This eventually turned into a personal relationship that lasted for over a decade. Kandinsky was the first teacher who had taken Münter's painting abilities seriously. In the summer of 1902, Kandinsky invited Münter to join him at his summer painting classes just south of Munich in the Alps, and she accepted.

At first I experienced great difficulty with my brushwork – I mean with what the French call la touche de pinceau. So Kandinsky taught me how to achieve the effects that I wanted with a palette knife... My main difficulty was I could not paint fast enough. My pictures are all moments of life – I mean instantaneous visual experiences, generally noted very rapidly and spontaneously. When I begin to paint, it's like leaping suddenly into deep waters, and I never know beforehand whether I will be able to swim. Well, it was Kandinsky who taught me the technique of swimming. I mean that he has taught me to work fast enough, and with enough self-assurance, to be able to achieve this kind of rapid and spontaneous recording of moments of life.

— Gabriele Münter, Reinhold Heller, Gabriele Münter: The Years of Expressionism 1903–1920. New York: Presteverlag, 1997.

== Career ==
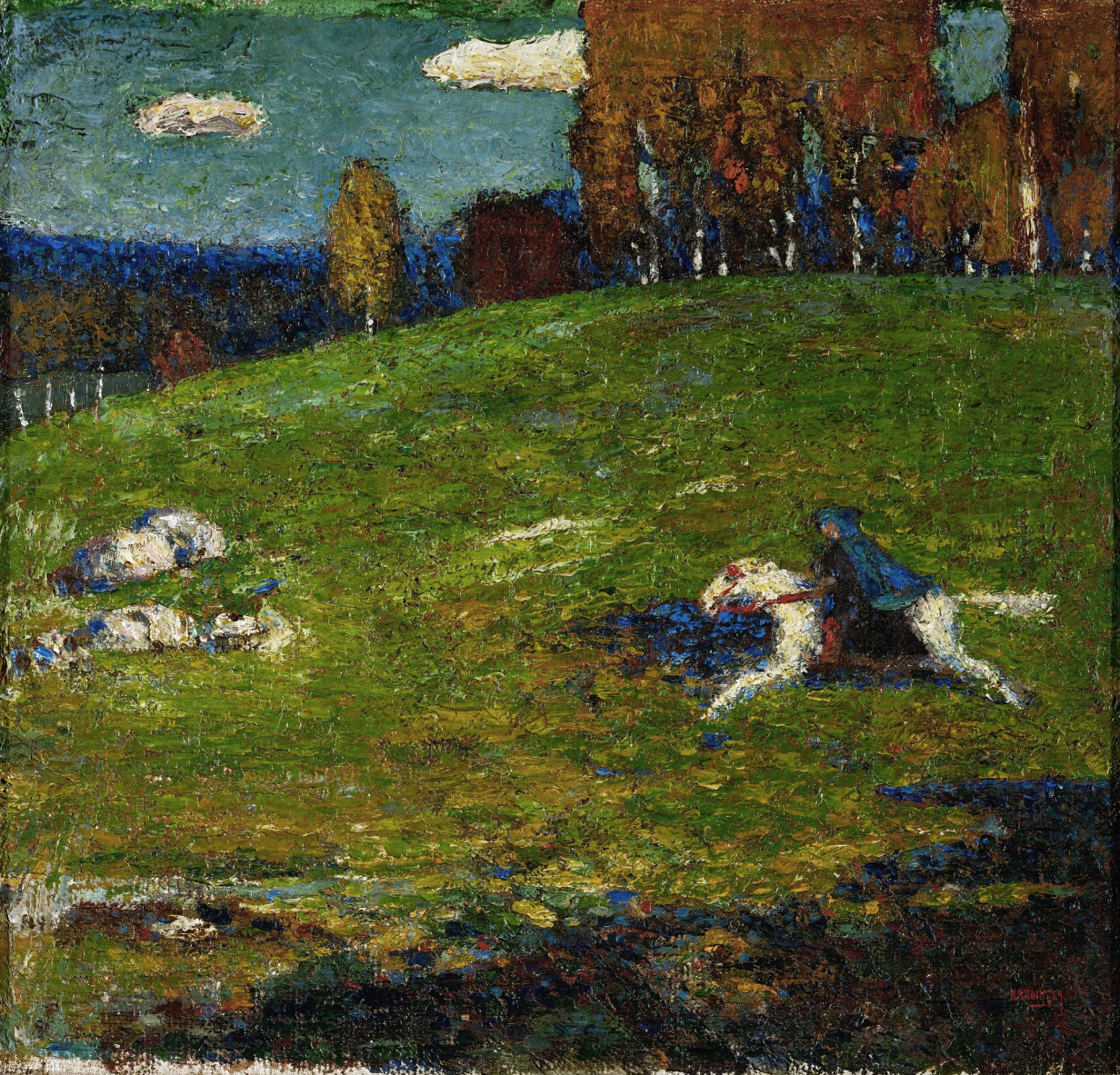
Kandinsky's The Blue Rider (Der Blaue Reiter), 1903, private collection

Münter was heavily focused on German Expressionism, and she worked in various media, including a significant output in wood and linocut prints. She kept a journal and documented her journeys with a state-of-the-art camera. She was familiar with many of the more famous artists of the time; in one of her journals, she stated that she wanted to learn from the avant-garde artists in France. Münter and Kandinsky traveled together from 1903-1908. From 1906-1907, they spent time in Sèvres, a suburb of Paris. They both exhibited works in the Salon des Independents and the Salon d'Automne.

Münter was part of a small subgroup of artists active in transforming late-Impressionist, Neo-Impressionist, and Jugendstil (or Art Nouveau) painting into the more radical, non-naturalistic art now identified as Expressionism. Early on, Münter developed a great interest in landscapes. Münter's landscape paintings employ a radical Jugendstil simplicity and suggestive symbolism with softly muted colors, collapsed pictorial space and flattened forms. By 1908, her work began to change. Strongly influenced by Henri Matisse and Fauvism, Gauguin, and van Gogh, Münter's work became more representative and she took refuge in the small Bavarian market town of Murnau, a village untouched by industrialization, progress, and technology. Münter bought a house and spent much of her life there. It was here, in Münter's landscape paintings, that she emphasized nature, imaginative landscapes and an opposition to German modernism.

In 1909 Münter purchased a house with garden in Murnau am Staffelsee on the edge of the Bavarian Alps. The garden and the countryside were a lucrative source of inspiration for Münter and Kandinsky. Münter's landscapes are unusual in their use of blues, greens, yellows, and pinks; and color plays a large role in Münter's early works. Color is used to evoke feelings: picturesque, inviting, imaginative, and rich in fantasy. In Münter's landscapes, she presents the village and countryside as manifestations of human life, but there is a constant interaction and coexistence with nature.

Kandinsky began to adopt Münter's use of saturated colors and abstract expressionist style. Münter and Kandinsky traveled through Europe including the Netherlands, Italy, and France, as well as North Africa. It was during this time that they met Henri Rousseau and Henri Matisse. Münter and Kandinsky helped establish the Munich-based avant-garde group called the Neue Künstlervereinigung (New Artists' Association). She contributed to a number of the most significant avant-garde exhibitions in Germany up till World War I.

In 1911 Münter, Kandinsky, and Franz Marc founded the reformist organization Der Blaue Reiter (The Blue Rider). In the same year Münter was one of the first artists to exhibit with the German Expressionist group. She contributed six paintings to the first exhibition, and 14 to the second. Within the group, artistic approaches and aims varied amongst artists; however, they shared a common desire to express spiritual truths through art. They championed modern art, the connection between visual art and music, the spiritual and symbolic associations of color and a spontaneous, intuitive approach to painting in its move toward abstraction.

There is a transition in Münter's work from copying nature more or less impressionistically to feeling its content, abstracting, and drawing out an extract. There grew an interest in painting the spirit of the modern civilization, its social and political turmoil and its gravitation towards materialism and alienation. Münter noted that pictures are all moments of life: instantaneous visual experiences, generally rapid and spontaneous; her paintings each have their own identity, their own shape, and their own function.

For Münter, it is the use of color that expresses these ideas. The German Expressionists moved towards primitive art as a model of abstraction or non-representational, non-academic, non-bourgeois art. The German artist looked not for harmony of outward appearance, but for the mystery hidden behind the external form. These artists were interested in the soul of things, wanting to lay it bare.

== Later years ==
Staffelsee in Autumn, 1923, National Museum of Women in the Arts

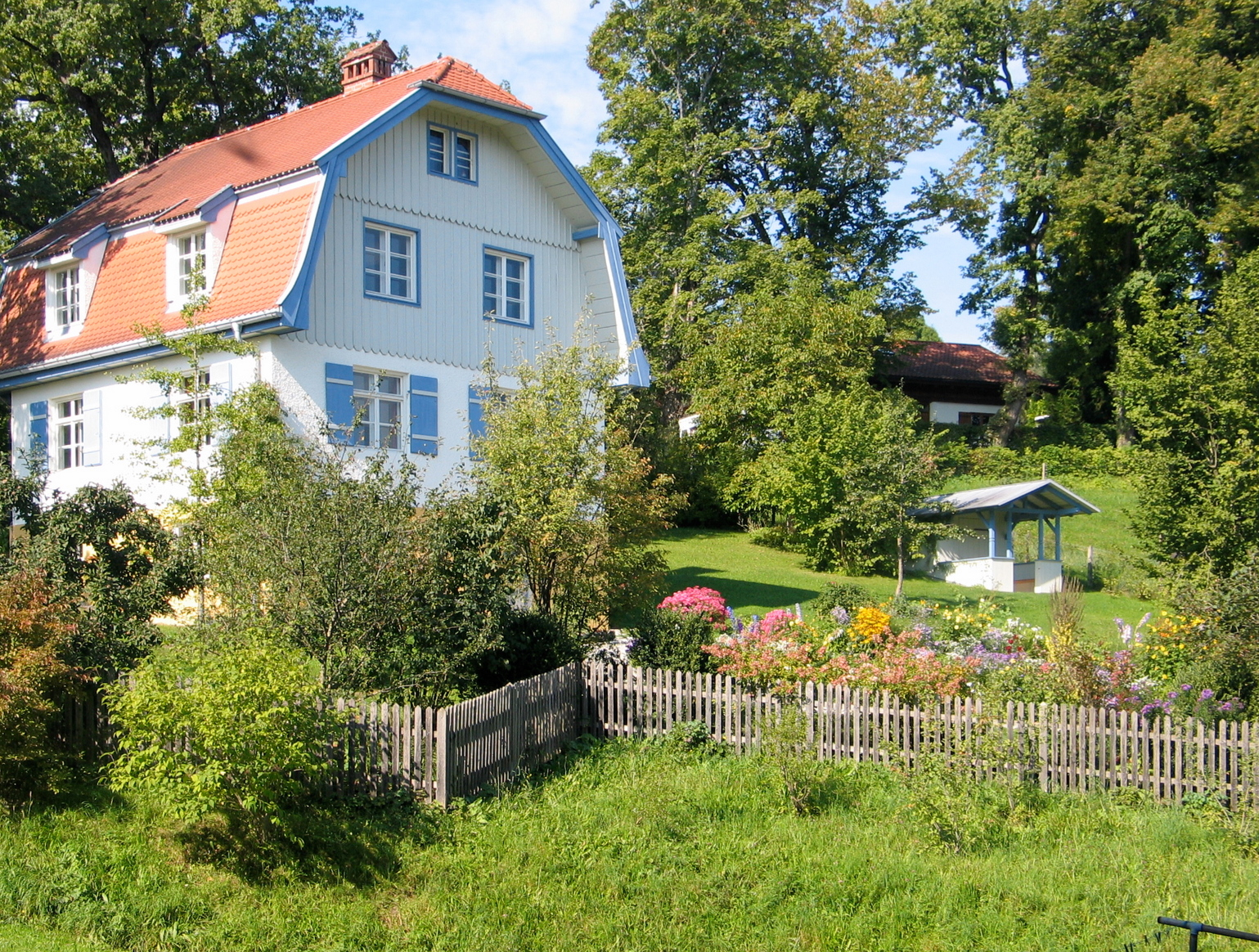
Gabriele Münter's house in Murnau

When World War I began, Münter and Kandinsky relocated to Switzerland. In 1914, Kandinsky returned to Russia without her and their relationship worsened due to mutual tensions and disappointments over his lack of commitment to marriage. His marriage in 1917 to Nina Andreevskaya marked the end of Münter and Kandinsky's relationship. Subsequently, there was a period of inactivity in her art career. She returned a number of paintings and drawings to Kandinsky, and stored other pieces in a warehouse for many years. She resumed painting in the late 1920s after she had moved back to Germany with Johannes Eichner after the war.

In the 1930s, as tension started to grip Europe, and modernist movements were condemned in Germany by the Nazi government, she had all of the art works done by her, Kandinsky, and the other members of the Blaue Reiter transported to her house, where she hid them. In spite of her financial problems, she preserved them with care during World War II. Through several house searches, the pieces were never found.

On her eightieth birthday, Münter gave her entire collection, which consisted of more than 80 oil paintings and 330 drawings, to the Städtische Galerie in the Lenbachhaus in Munich. In 1956, Münter received a few awards such as the Culture Prize from the City of Munich. Münter's work was exhibited in the 1960s in the United States for the first time and was shown at Mannheim Kunsthalle in 1961. When she was with Johannes Eichner, she still continued to represent the movement as the Gabrielle Münter and Johannes Eichner Foundation was established and has become a valuable research center for Münter's art, as well as the art that was done by the Blaue Reiter group.

Münter lived the rest of her life in Murnau, traveling back and forth to Munich. She died at home in Murnau am Staffelsee on 19 May 1962.

== Selected exhibitions ==
From 23 June to 11 September 2005, the Courtauld Gallery exhibited Gabriele Münter: The Search for Expression 1906-1917. The exhibit highlighted the range of Münter's work and was accompanied by catalog with essays by Annegret Hoberg and Shulamith Behr. (ISBN 978-1-903-47029-9)

From 31 October 2017 to 8 April 2018, Lenbachhaus Munich exhibited Gabriele Münter. Painting to the Point. It was the first retrospective of her work in decades and included more than 120 paintings. The exhibit was organized by Städtische Galerie im Lenbachhaus und Kunstbau and Gabriele Münter and Johannes Eichner Foundation, in cooperation with the Louisiana Museum of Modern Art (exhibited 3 May 2018 – 19 August 2018), and the Museum Ludwig, Cologne (exhibited 15 September 2018 – 13 January 2019).

From 20 October 2023 to 18 February 2024, the Leopold Museum exhibited Gabriele Münter: Retrospective. The exhibition was described as the "first institution in Austria to dedicate a comprehensive solo exhibition to her work."

From 8 June 2024 to 12 January 2025, Marta Herford exhibited Kathrin Sonntag and Gabriele Münter: The Travelling Eye. The exhibit focused on photographs taken by Münter during a trip with her sister Emmy to the United States between 1899 and 1900 paired with the photographs of Sonntag. The exhibit traveled to the Kunstmuseum Ravensburg from 22 November 2025 – 22 March 2026. The catalog of the same name by was published in 2024.(ISBN 978-3-959-05882-7)

From 12 November 2024 to 9 February 2025, the Museo Nacional Thyssen-Bornemisza exhibited Gabriele Münter: The Great Expressionist Woman Painter The exhibit included more than one hundred paintings, drawings, prints and photographs.

In 2025, the exhibition Gabriele Münter: Painting to the Point was presented at the Musée d'Art Moderne de Paris.

From 7 November 2025 to 26 April 2026, the Solomon R. Guggenheim Museum exhibited Gabriele Münter: Contours of a World. The show exhibited paintings and photographs she took during her visit to the United States between 1898 and 1900.

== Style ==
Münter's style evolved over the course of her career. Her early works from her days at the Phalanx school show an extensive use of the palette knife and a limited color range of yellows, greens and browns. Her subsequent landscapes, many of which were painted in Murnau, employed strong contours around a palette of blue, green, yellow, and pink, often with red for emphasis. Throughout her career, color continued to play a large role in her work. In the early 1920s, Münter painted portraits with the minimal line and compositional clarity valued in Neue Sachlichkeit circles of the day.

== See also ==
- List of German women artists

== Sources ==
- Behr, Shulmith, Movements in Modern Art: Expressionism. Cambridge University Press, 1999.
