= Eugen von Kahler =

German painter

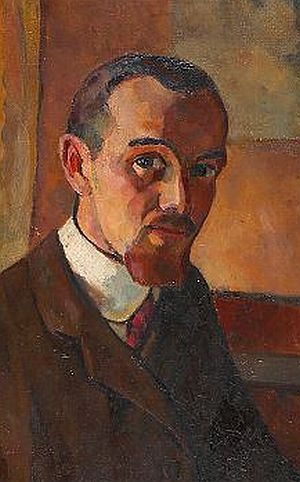
Self-portrait (date unknown)

Eugen von Kahler, originally Eugen Kohn (6 January 1882, Prague - 13 December 1911, Prague) was a Bohemian-German painter, graphic artist and writer of Jewish ancestry. Most of his works are in the Expressionist style.

== Biography ==
He came from a family of wealthy industrialists who changed their name from Kohn to Kahler in 1894. From 1901 to 1905, he studied at the Academy of Fine Arts, Munich, with Heinrich Knirr and Franz von Stuck. During this time, he also took private lessons from Hugo von Habermann.

He was diagnosed with tuberculosis in 1900 and his education was interrupted by numerous stays in sanatoria. Despite this, he was able to travel to Paris in 1907, where he took a course in plein aire painting at a private school and copied works at the Louvre. He was a regular patron at the Café Du Dôme, where his associates included Friedrich Ahlers-Hestermann, Oskar Moll, Jules Pascin, Elisabeth Epstein and Sonia Terk. His exhibitions included several showings at the Salon d’Automne and the Salon des Indépendants.

In an effort to alleviate his suffering, he took a trip to Egypt in the summer of 1908, seeking a drier climate. The following year, he visited Tunisia and Algeria, which inspired him to create numerous works with Orientalist themes; some of which were shown at an exhibit by the Neue Künstlervereinigung München in 1911. That same year, his father was knighted and everyone in his family became entitled to attach "von" to their names. This was followed by his first solo exhibition at the Moderne Galerie, operated by the art collector, Heinrich Thannhauser.

Success was short-lived, however, as he succumbed to his illness two months later. A few days after his death, two of his works were displayed at the first exhibition of Der Blaue Reiter. He was interred at the New Jewish Cemetery. His estate was managed by his cousin, the writer Erich von Kahler, who discovered a large number of poems. They were published in 1914 by Poeschel & Trepte, as a limited edition, under the title Sinnen und Gesang (roughly, Feelings and Song).

== Selected paintings ==
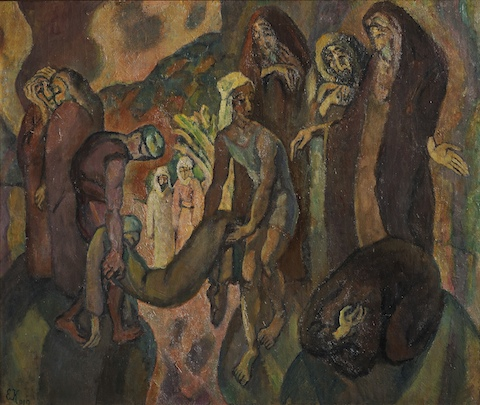
Biblical Composition

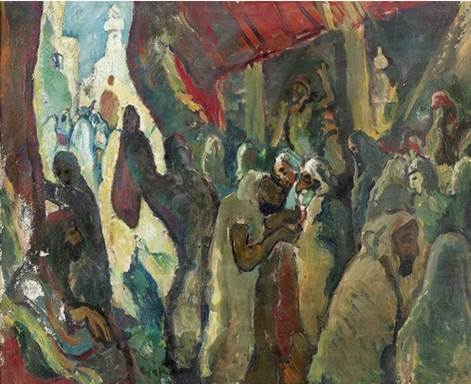
Oriental Bazaar

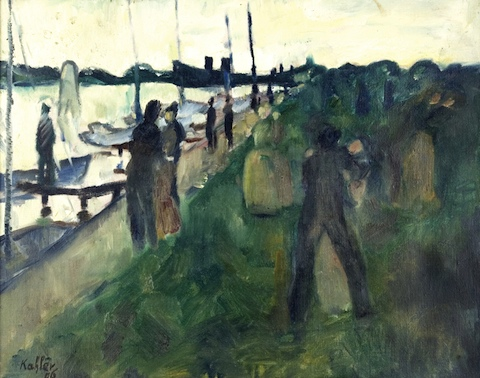
On the Seashore

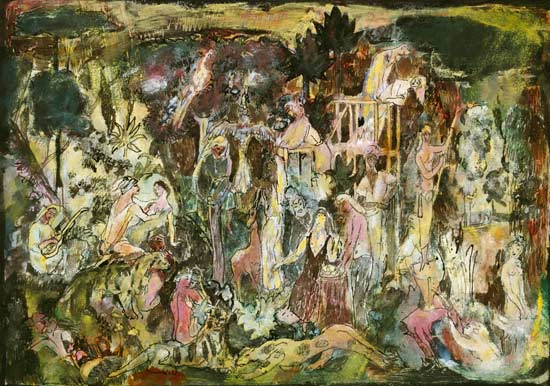
The Garden of Love
