= Marianne von Werefkin =

Russian artist (1860–1938)

- Марианна Верёвкина
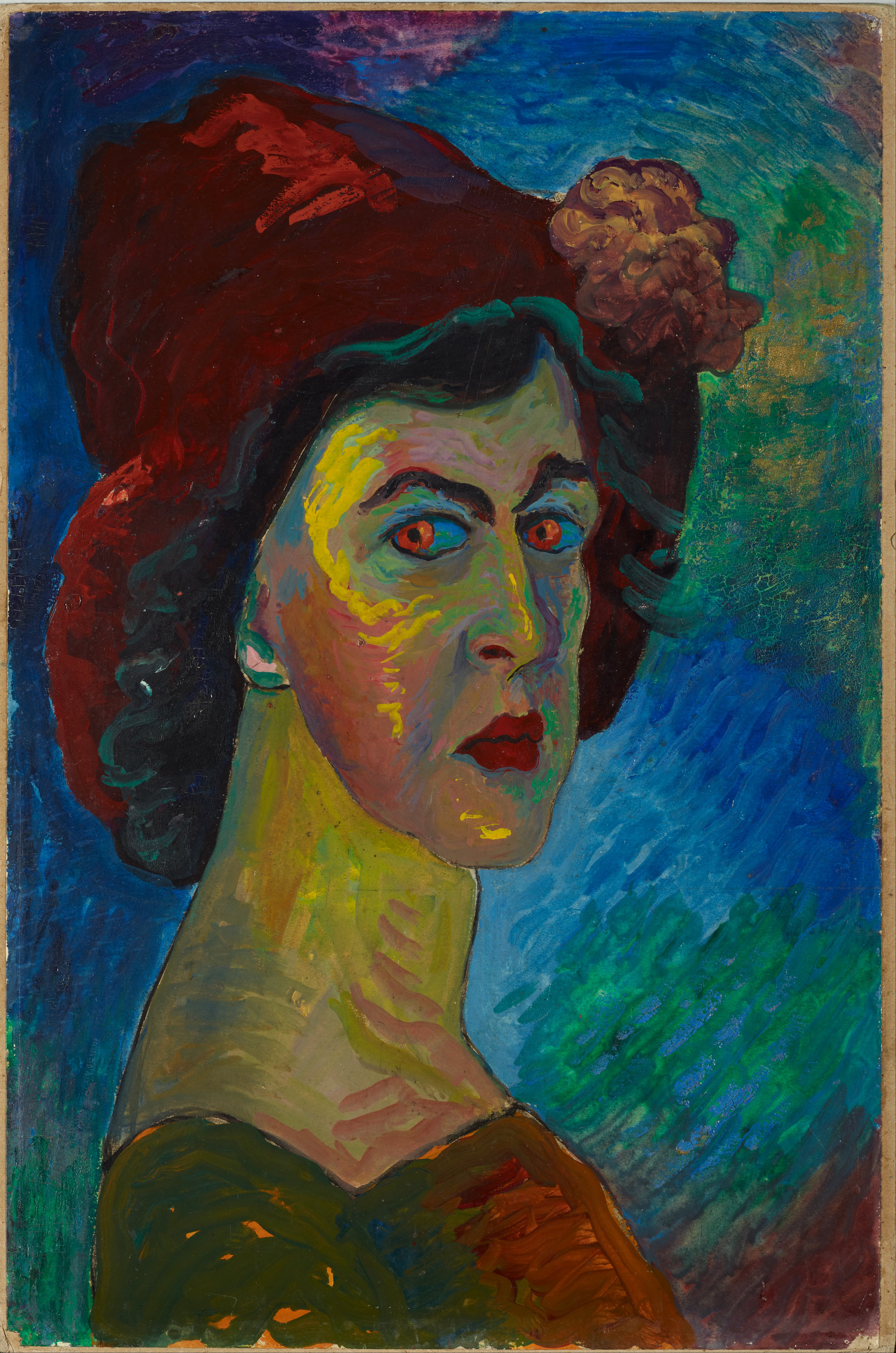
- Self-portrait, c. 1910
- Born: Marianna Vladimirovna Veryovkina; 10 September 1860; Tula, Russia
- Died: 6 February 1938 (aged 77); Ascona, Ticino, Switzerland
- Known for: Painting
- Movement: Expressionism

Mariamna Vladimirovna Veryovkina (Note: Russian: Мариа́мна Влади́мировна Верёвкина, IPA: [mərʲɪˈanːə vlɐˈdʲimʲɪrəvnə vʲɪˈrʲɵfkʲɪnə].) (10 September [O.S. 29 August] 1860 – 6 February 1938), (Note: The Royal Academy of Arts gallery guide for the 2022/23 exhibition "Making Modernism" gives Werefkin's dates as 11 September 1860 – 6 February 1938.) commonly known as Marianne von Werefkin, (Note: Russian: Мариа́нна [фон] Верёвкин[а], Верёфкин.) was a Russian-born painter, active in Germany and Switzerland during the late Belle Époque and interwar periods. She is particularly known for her Expressionist works.

== Life and career ==
=== In Russia 1860–1896 ===
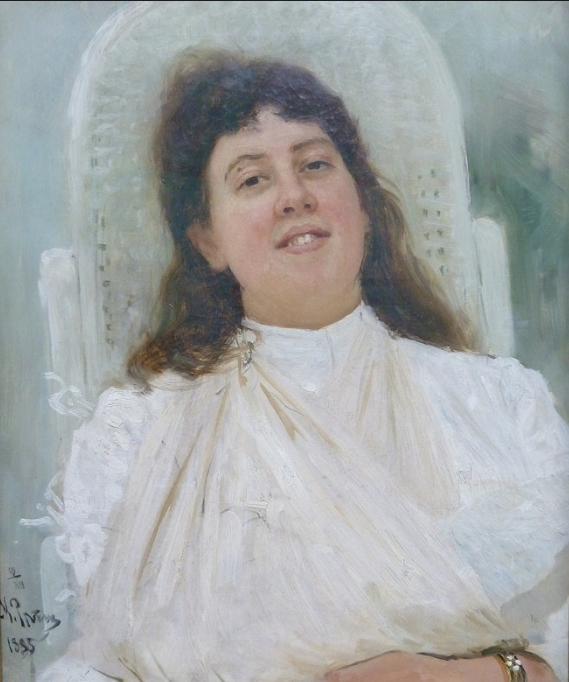
Portrait of Marianne von Werefkin with her right arm in a sling, 1888, by Ilya Repin. From the former collection of German concert singer Ernst Alfred Aye; Werefkin's longtime companion, administrator and partial heir. Today in the Museum Wiesbaden.

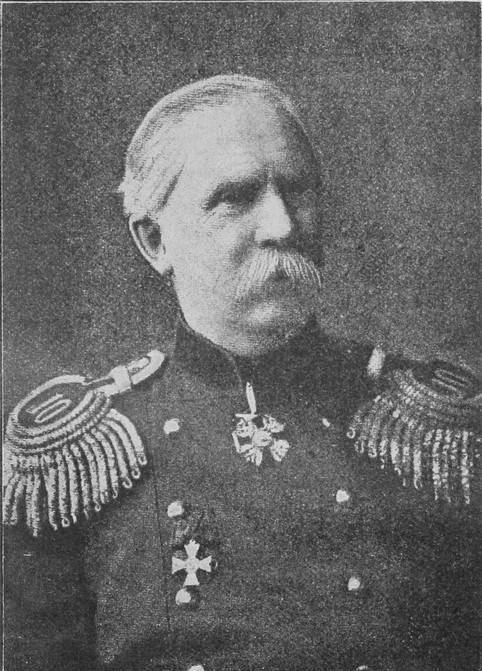
General Veryovkin, the artist's father.

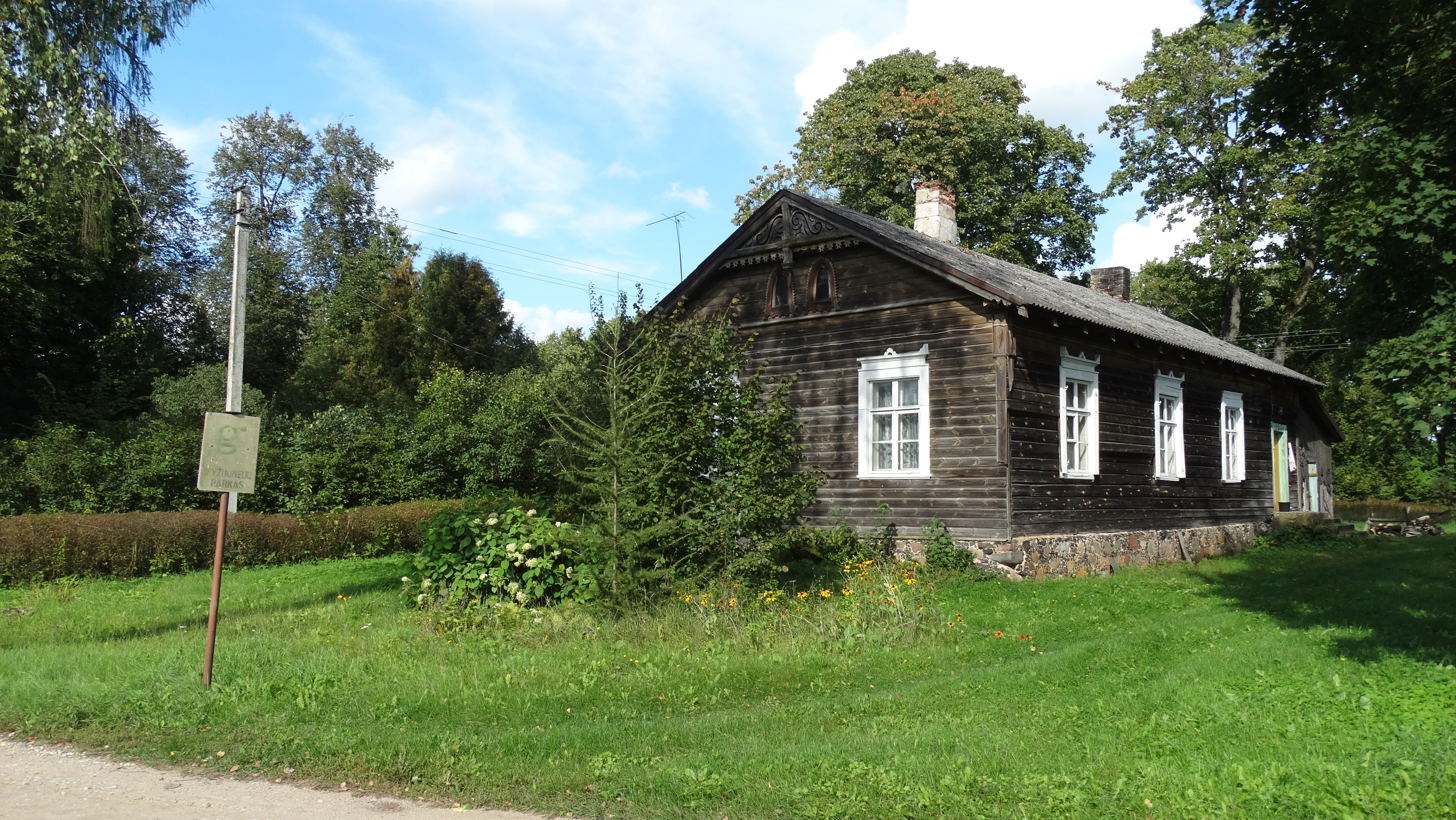
Werefkin's atelier on the family Blagodat summer estate, Lithuania. It is the only studio building in Lithuania of a 19th-century artist.

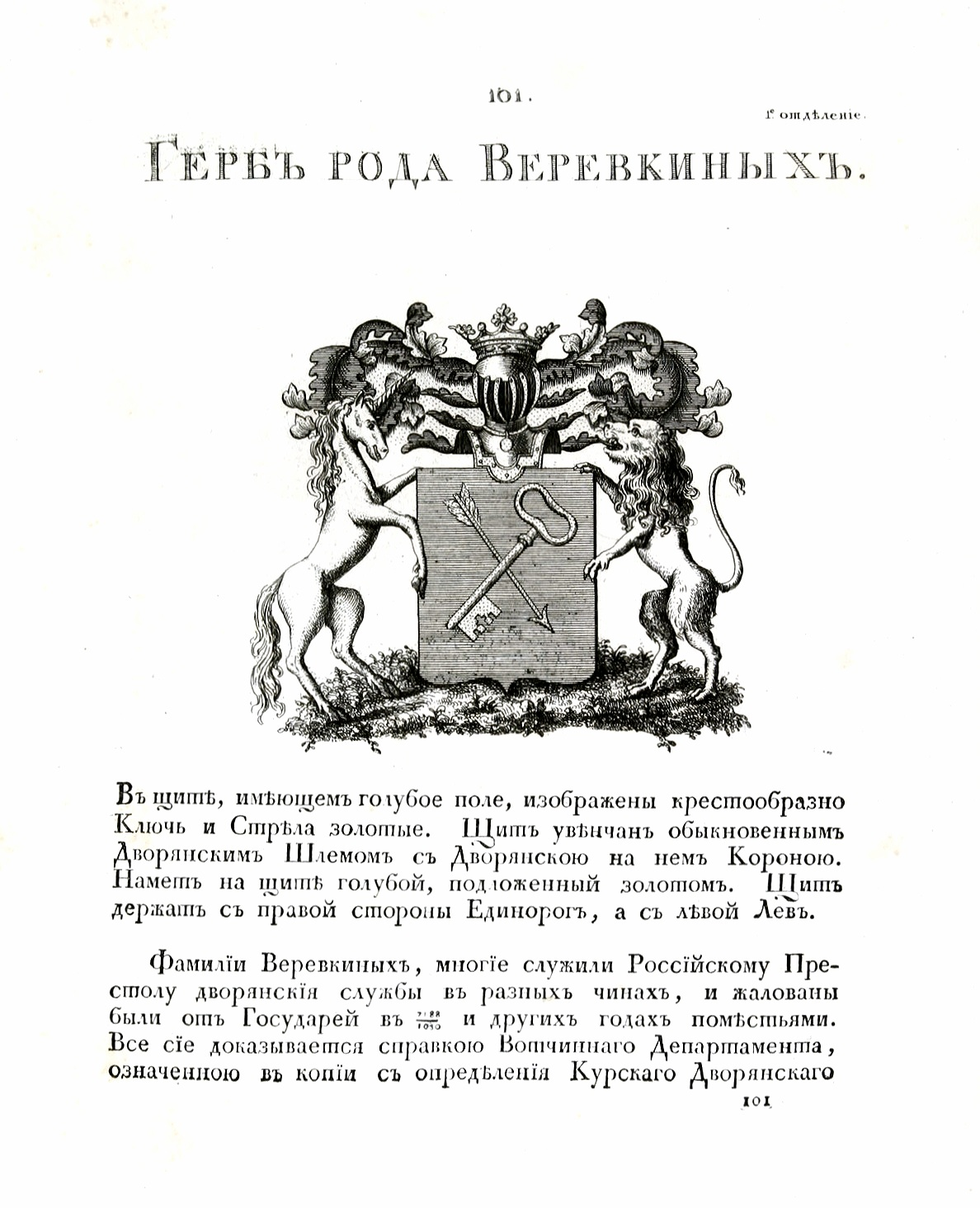
Coat of Arms of the Werefkin family

Werefkin was born to Elizabeth (née Daragan; 1834–1885) and Vladimir Nikolayevich Veryovkin (1821–1896), commander of the Yekaterinburg Regiment in Tula, the capital of the Tula Governorate. Her father was of Russian nobility whose ancestors came from Moscow. He made a career in the Imperial Russian Army, becoming a general and finally commander of the Peter and Paul Fortress in Saint Petersburg. Her mother belonged to an old family of Cossack princes, whose father, Lieutenant general Peter Mikhailovich Daragan (1800–1875), was the governor of Tula from 1850 to 1866, the official palace is where her daughter Marianne was born. In 1874, Werefkin's talent for drawing was discovered. Werefkin immediately received academic drawing lessons. As a teenager, Werefkin had a large studio in the Peter and Paul Fortress and an atelier on her family's summer estate named "Blagodat" (Grace or Blessing) in Lithuania (at that time occupied by Russia). It is located about 7 kilometres northwest of the provincial town of Utena in Vyžuonėlės Park, which was declared a Lithuanian natural monument in 1958. Werefkin regarded the estate and the landscape there as her real home.

In 1880, Werefkin became a private student of Ilya Repin, the most important representative of the Peredvizhniki ("wandering painters"), who represented Russian Realism. Through Repin, Werefkin came into contact with the artists' colony of Abramtsevo and with Valentin Serov, Repin's second private student, at an early stage. From 1883 in Moscow, Werefkin studied painting with Illarion Pryanishnikov and attended lectures by the philosopher Vladimir Solovyov. In 1888, Repin painted a portrait of Werefkin, following a hunting accident in which Werefkin accidentally shot her right hand, the painter's hand.

Werefkin's first artistically important work phase was before 1890 when she made a name for herself in the realistic painting as the "Russian Rembrandt" of the Tsarist Empire. Some works have been preserved, others can only be verified through photos, and many have disappeared. After 1890, Werefkin modernized her painting style and switched to En plein air painting with traits of Eastern European Impressionism. Only two paintings from this period appear to exist.

In 1892 Werefkin entered into a 27-year relationship with Alexej von Jawlensky. Werefkin was more advanced in painting than Jawlensky was and had decided to train and support the penniless military officer who was five years her junior.

== In Germany 1896–1914 ==
In 1896, after the death of Werefkin's father, which would provide Werefkin with a noble Tsarist pension of 7,000 rubles per annum, she moved to Munich with her 11-year old lady's maid Helene Nesnakomoff and Jawlensky. Werefkin's annual pension at that time corresponded to around twenty-two thousand German mark. Werefkin's rather young 'lady's maid', Nesnakomoff, had come to the Werefkin's household at age 9, after the death of the child's stepfather who was a local police officer, leaving the mother, who drank heavily, with three children as a beggar. Werefkin's father allowed Helene to come into the household. Her sister, Marie, was placed in a girls' asylum, and her brother stayed with his mother and was a thief […] who could not be changed. Since the mother was unreliable, Werefkin's administrator advised that the mother cede all her child care rights to Werefkin, which she did. Despite Nesnakomoff's tragic circumstance, in return for the warmth and sustenance, she had to earn her keep as an apprentice to Werefkin's [then] lady's maid in Tula.

In Munich, Werefkin rented a comfortable double apartment on the third floor of Giselastrasse 23 in the Schwabing district, which she furnished partly with Empire and Biedermeier style furniture, which she contrasted with folk art furniture made in the workshops of the artist Yelena Polenova (1850-1898) in the artists' colony of Abramtsevo. Werefkin initially entrusted Jawlensky's further education to the Slovenian Anton Ažbe, while interrupting her own painting for exactly ten years in favour of his education. Like many women in art, she subordinated her artistic ambitions to the interests of her lover.

Werefkin knew that Jawlensky was a womanizer: "Love is a dangerous thing, especially in the hands of Jawlensky." Werefkin refused to marry, not least because of the generous pension from the Tsar, which she would have lost if she were a married woman. But Werefkin was determined to support Jawlensky as an artist in every way. In Werefkin's place, Jawlensky was to achieve and realize everything artistically that a 'weak woman' was in any case denied.

“Three years passed in tireless nurturing of his mind and heart. Everything, everything he received from me, I pretended to take - everything I put into him I pretended to receive as a gift... so that he should not be jealous as an artist, I hid my art from him" (Werefkin, quoted from Fäthke 1980:17). Jawlensky's gratitude in return was abusing Werefkin's young lady's maid, with whom Jawlensky was already having a relationship, despite her young age, she modelled for Jawlensky and was madly infatuated with him.

In 1897, Werefkin founded the Brotherhood of St. Luke (Bruderschaft von Sankt Lukas) in her "pink salon", whose members saw themselves in the tradition of the Guild of Saint Luke and which ultimately formed the nucleus of the New Artists' Association Munich (N.K.V.M) and The Blue Rider.

In 1897 Werefkin was in Venice with Ažbe, Jawlensky, Dmitry Kardovsky and Igor Grabar, initially to visit a Repin exhibition. They then studied the painting of old masters in various museums in northern Italy.

In 1902 Werefkin's lady's maid Nesnakomoff, then 17 years old, gave birth to a child from Jawlensky, named Andreas Nesnakomoff (died 1984 - named Andreas Jawlensky after his parents' marriage, later in life he would also become a known artist), at the time of the birth both Nesnakomoff and Jawlensky had returned for more than one year to Russia. In November 1902 Werefkin began writing her Lettres à un Inconnu (Letters to an Unknown) as a kind of diary, which she finished in 1906. A year later she went to Normandy with the Russian painter Alexander von Salzmann, while Jawlensky stayed in Munich. Jawlensky's painting Die Werefkin im Profil (The Werefkin in profile) was created around 1905.

In 1906 Werefkin travelled to France with Jawlensky, Nesnakomoff and son Andreas. First, they went to Brittany. From there Werefkin went via Paris and Arles to Sausset-les-Pins near Marseille, where her painter friend Pierre Girieud (1876–1948) lived. There, on the Mediterranean, Werefkin resumed her artistic activity.

In 1907, Werefkin created her first expressionist paintings. Stylistically, Werefkin followed the theories of Vincent van Gogh, Paul Gauguin's surface painting, Louis Anquetin's tone-on-tone painting, Henri de Toulouse-Lautrec's caricature and bold painting, and the ideas of Les Nabis. In the circle of friends in Munich, Werefkin was given the nickname "The Frenchwoman". In terms of iconology and motifs, Werefkin often drew on the works of Edvard Munch, and she brought the aforementioned artists into the picture before her colleagues, such as Wassily Kandinsky and Gabriele Münter, who took the first steps towards Expressionism. At that time, the artists Jan Verkade, Hugo Troendle, Hermann Huber and Curt Herrmann frequented Werefkin's salon.

In the spring of 1908, Gauguin's Polish friend, Władysław Ślewiński, visited Werefkin. He convinced Jawlensky of surface painting. In the summer, the two artist couples Werefkin/Jawlensky and Münter/Kandinsky met in Murnau am Staffelsee in Upper Bavaria to paint together. In the winter of the same year, Werefkin, Jawlensky, Adolf Erbslöh and Oscar Wittenstein came up with the idea of founding the N.K.V.M., of which Kandinsky was appointed its first chairman in 1909. The dancer Alexander Sacharoff became a member of the N.K.V.M. With Werefkin and Jawlensky he prepared his big performance at the Odeon in Munich.

In 1909 the Swiss painter Cuno Amiet, who at the time belonged to the Brücke (Bridge) artists' group, was a guest in Werefkin's salon. Amiet would later become one of Werefkin's best Swiss friends alongside Paul Klee and his wife Lily. On 1 December 1909 was the opening of the first exhibition of the N.K.V.M. with 16 artists. Werefkin exhibited six paintings, including Schuhplattler, her commitment to Bavarian folk art. In 1909 the painting Zwillinge (Werefkin) (Twins) was created.

Shortly thereafter, Werefkin went to Lithuania to her brother Peter (1861-1946), who was governor in Kaunas. Many drawings and quite a few paintings were made there that winter.

At the end of September 1910, Franz Marc made contact with the artists of the N.K.V.M. We learn from him that it was primarily Werefkin and Jawlensky who opened his eyes to a new art form.

From the beginning of May 1911, Pierre Girieud (1876–1948) lived with Werefkin and Jawlensky on Giselastrasse 23 when he and Marc showed his paintings in an exhibition at the Modern Gallery Heinrich Thannhauser. In the summer, Werefkin travelled with Jawlensky to Prerow on the Baltic Sea. At the end of the year, they went to Paris, where they met Henri Matisse personally.

In December 1911, Kandinsky left the N.K.V.M., together with Münter and Marc, to present the first exhibition of the editors of Der Blaue Reiter (The Blue Rider) in the winter of 1911/1912. In 1912, Werefkin and Jewlensky also left the N.K.V.M., which not until 1920 was officially removed from the Munich Register of Associations. Werefkin also exhibited with the members of the N.K.V.M. and the Blue Rider together with the artists of the Bridge from 18 November 1911 to 31 January 31, 1912 in the New Secession in Berlin. Werefkin exhibited there her painting Schlittschuhläufer (Ice Skaters).

In 1913, Werefkin and Jawlensky participated in the exhibition of the editors of Der Blaue Reiter in the Berlin gallery Der Sturm (The Storm) by Herwarth Walden. In the same year, Werefkin intended the final separation from Jawlensky and travelled to Vilnius in Lithuania, where her brother Peter had meanwhile become governor. At the end of July 1914, Werefkin returned to Germany from Lithuania. She arrived in Munich on 26 July.

== In Switzerland 1914–1938 ==
When World War I broke out on 1 August 1914, Werefkin and Jawlensky had to leave Germany within 24 hours and fled to Switzerland with the service staff Helene Nesnakomoff with son Andreas, and Helene's sister Maria Nesnakomoff, who had earlier joined the household service. Werefkin handed over the keys and custodian of her apartment to Paul Klee and his wife Lily before fleeing to Switzerland. At first, they lived in Saint-Prex on Lake Geneva. As a result of the war, Werefkin's pension was cut in half. In 1916 there was a solo exhibition in Zürich, where the couple moved in September/October 1917.

=== Stateless person after the Bolshevik Revolution ===
As a result of the Russian October Revolution, Werefkin lost her Tsarist pension. Participation in Cabaret Voltaire followed after Werefkin had met its initiators. In 1918 Werefkin and Jawlensky moved to Ascona on Lake Maggiore. In 1919 Werefkin was involved in an exhibition "Painters of Ascona" in the Zürich Kunstsalon Wolfsberg together with Jawlensky, Robert Genin, Arthur Segal and Otto Niemeyer-Holstein. In 1920 some of Werefkin's works were shown at the Venice Biennale. Werefkin always lived in Switzerland as a stateless person, issued with a Nansen passport since 1922.

In 1921 Jawlensky separated from Werefkin and moved to Wiesbaden, where in 1922 he married Werefkin's housekeeper Helene Nesnakomoff, the mother of his son Andreas. During this difficult time, Werefkin became friends with the Zürich painter Willy Fries and his wife Katharina, née Righini (1894–1973). In 12 letters to Zürich between 1921 and 1925, Werefkin described her desperate situation, which, however, could not break her courage and her ability to work.

In 1924 Werefkin was a co-founder of the artist group Der Große Bär (The Great Bear, after the constellation Ursa Major) in Ascona together with Walter Helbig, Ernst Frick, Albert Kohler and others. This group of artists had a large exhibition in 1925 in the Kunsthalle Bern, followed by further joint exhibitions, including in 1928 in the Berlin Galerie Nierendorf together with Christian Rohlfs, Karl Schmidt-Rottluff and Robert Genin.

Frequently, Werefkin earned her living by painting posters and picture postcards or she wrote articles, for example in 1925 for the Neue Zürcher Zeitung, in which her impressions of a trip to Italy with Ernst Alfred Aye were subsequently printed.

In 1928, Werefkin wrote and painted her Ascona Impressions, which she dedicated to the Zürich art critic Hans Trog (1864–1928). In the same year, she met Diego Hagmann (1894-1986) and his wife Carmen (1905-2001), who saved her from greater economic hardship. In the last two years before the First World War in Munich, stylistic changes in Werefkin's pictures, which lead to her late work, had already become noticeable, but she continued to develop them in Switzerland. Her paintings no longer triggered the sudden 'shocks' in the viewer in the same way as they used to. Her works generally became more narrative, internalized and even more enigmatic than before. Writers in particular were attracted to them, encouraged to interpret and create their own, such as the poet Yvan Goll or the poet Bruno Goetz.

The typical Russian features in Werefkin's painting, especially in the colouring, which the poet Else Lasker-Schüler had already noticed in Munich, should appear particularly clear in her late work in Ascona. Even if she transferred these to Ticino motifs, Werefkin's pictures were initially foreign to most Swiss and were often misunderstood.

When Werefkin died in Ascona on 6 February 1938, she was buried in the local cemetery according to the Russian Orthodox rite, with the sympathy of almost the entire population.

A large part of her artistic and literary legacy is kept in the Fondazione Marianne Werefkin in Ascona in Ascona. Thanks to donations, their holdings have now grown to almost 100 paintings. The foundation also owns 170 sketchbooks and hundreds of drawings. A part of it is presented in the permanent collection of the Museo communale d'arte moderna in Ascona.

== Honours ==
The artist is the namesake of the "Marianne-Werefkin-Preis", which has been awarded by the Verein der Berliner Künstlerinnen (Association of Berlin Artists) to contemporary female artists every two years.

== Gallery of paintings ==
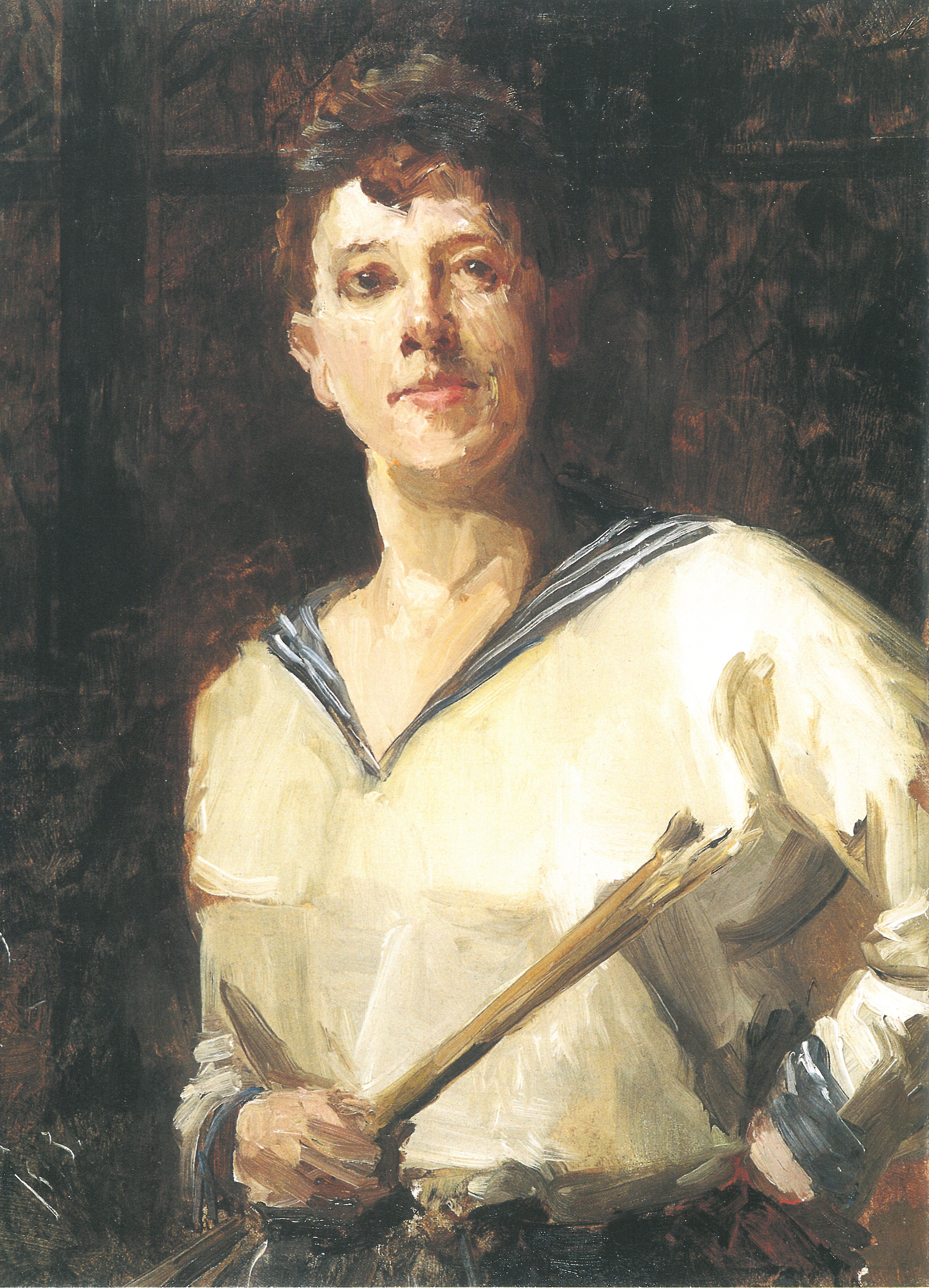
Self-Portrait in Sailor Blouse, 1893, oil on canvas

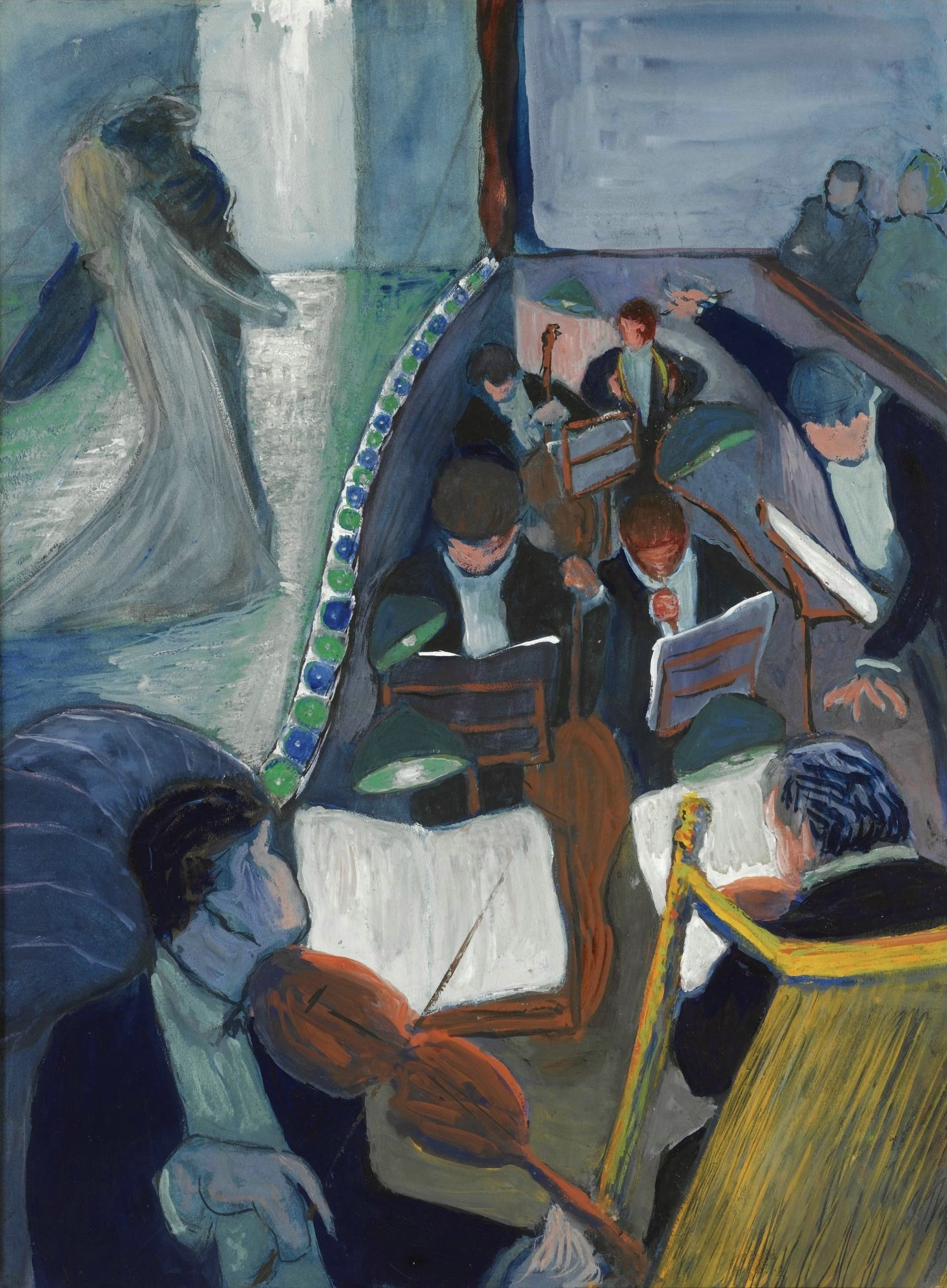
In the Theater I, 1906, tempera and gouache on paper

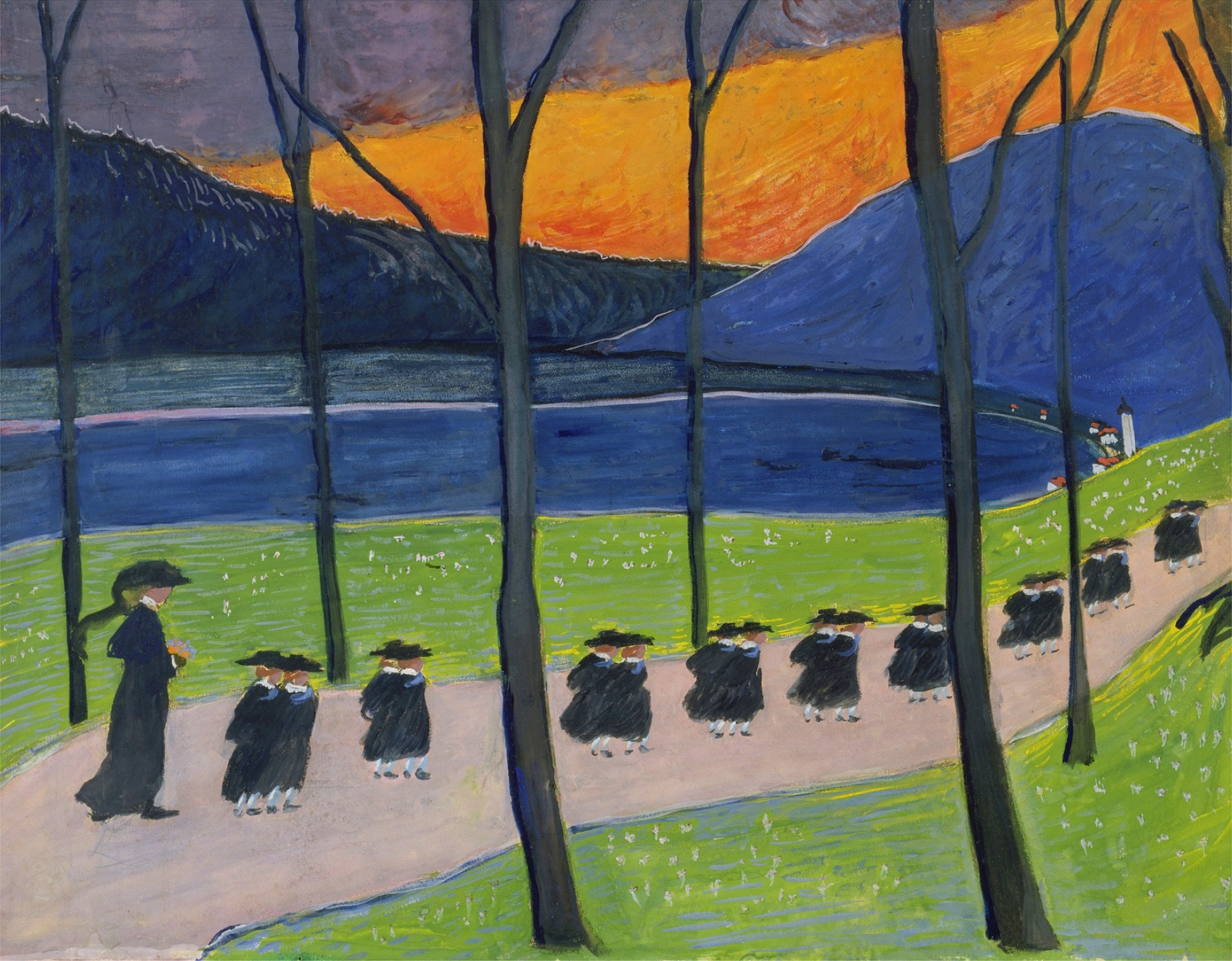
Fall, School (Herbst, Schule), c. 1907, tempera on cardboard

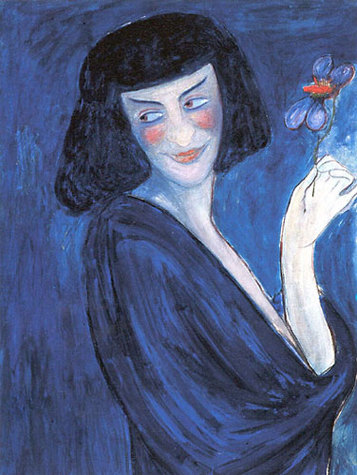
The Dancer Alexander Sakharoff, 1909, tempera

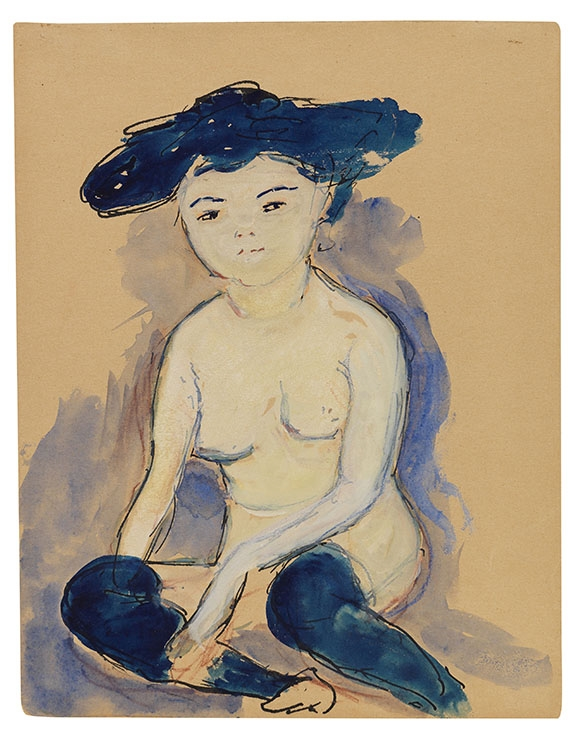
Helene (Helene Nesnakomoff, with fashionable Japanese Yoko Hyogo hairstyle), ca. 1909, gouache, quill and ink on wove paper; bequest of Werefkin, Nicholas Daragan private collection

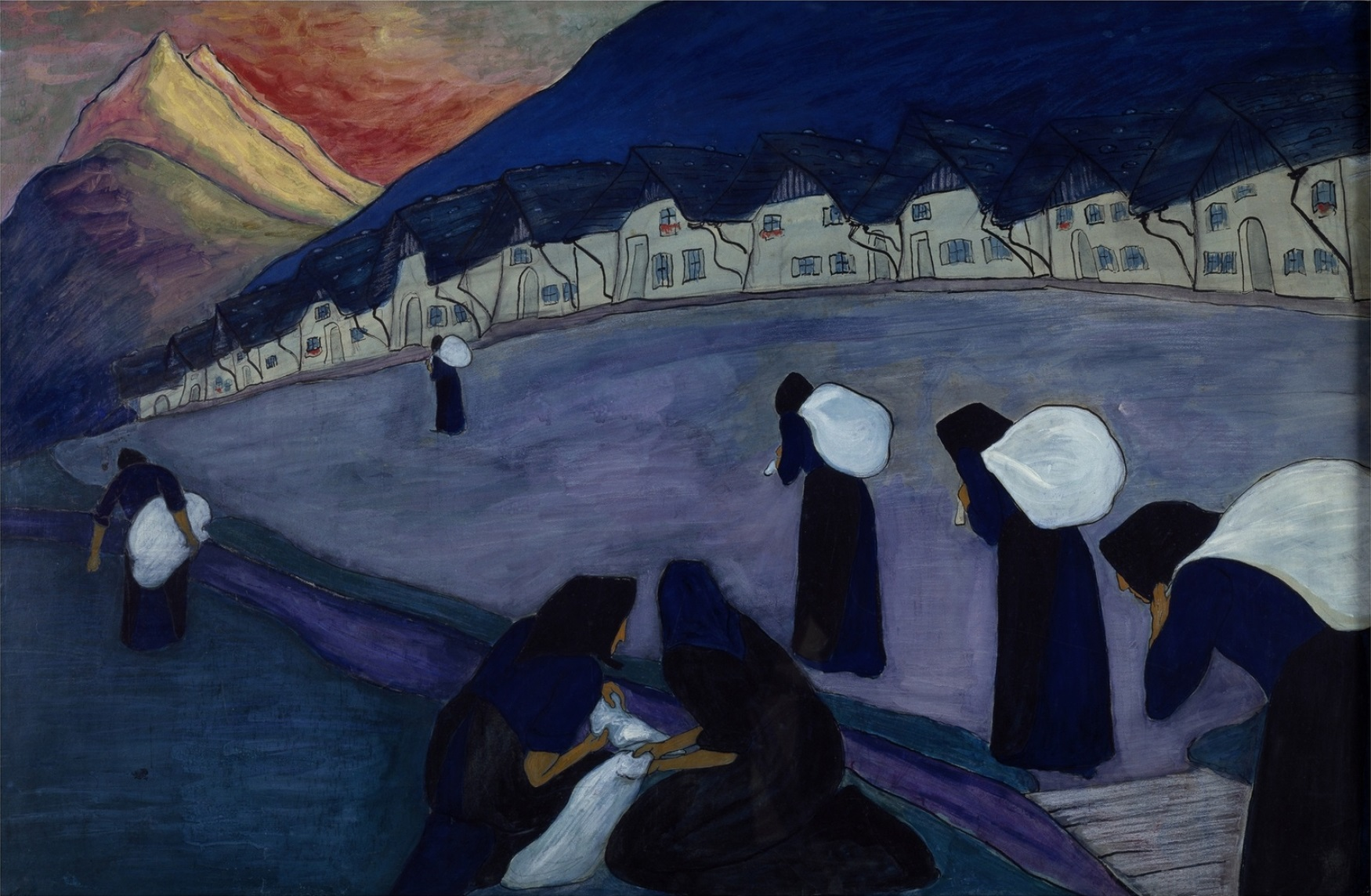
The Black Women (Schwarze Frauen), 1910, gouache on cardboard

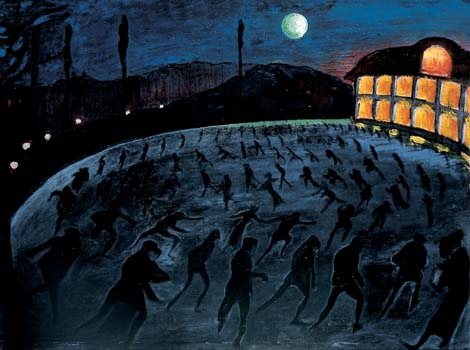
Ice Skaters (I pattinatori), 1911, tempera-painting on paper

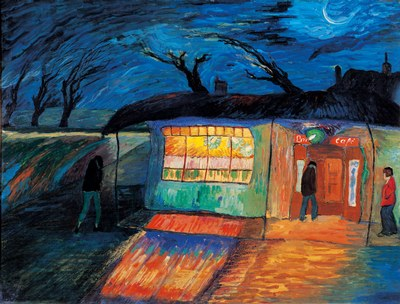
Storm Winds (Sturmwind), 1915–17, oil on canvas

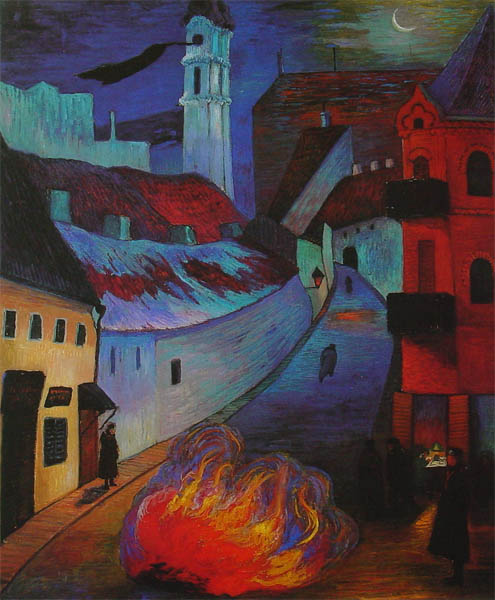
Police sentinel in Vilnius, 1917, tempera on canvas, Museo Comunale d'Arte Moderna, Ascona

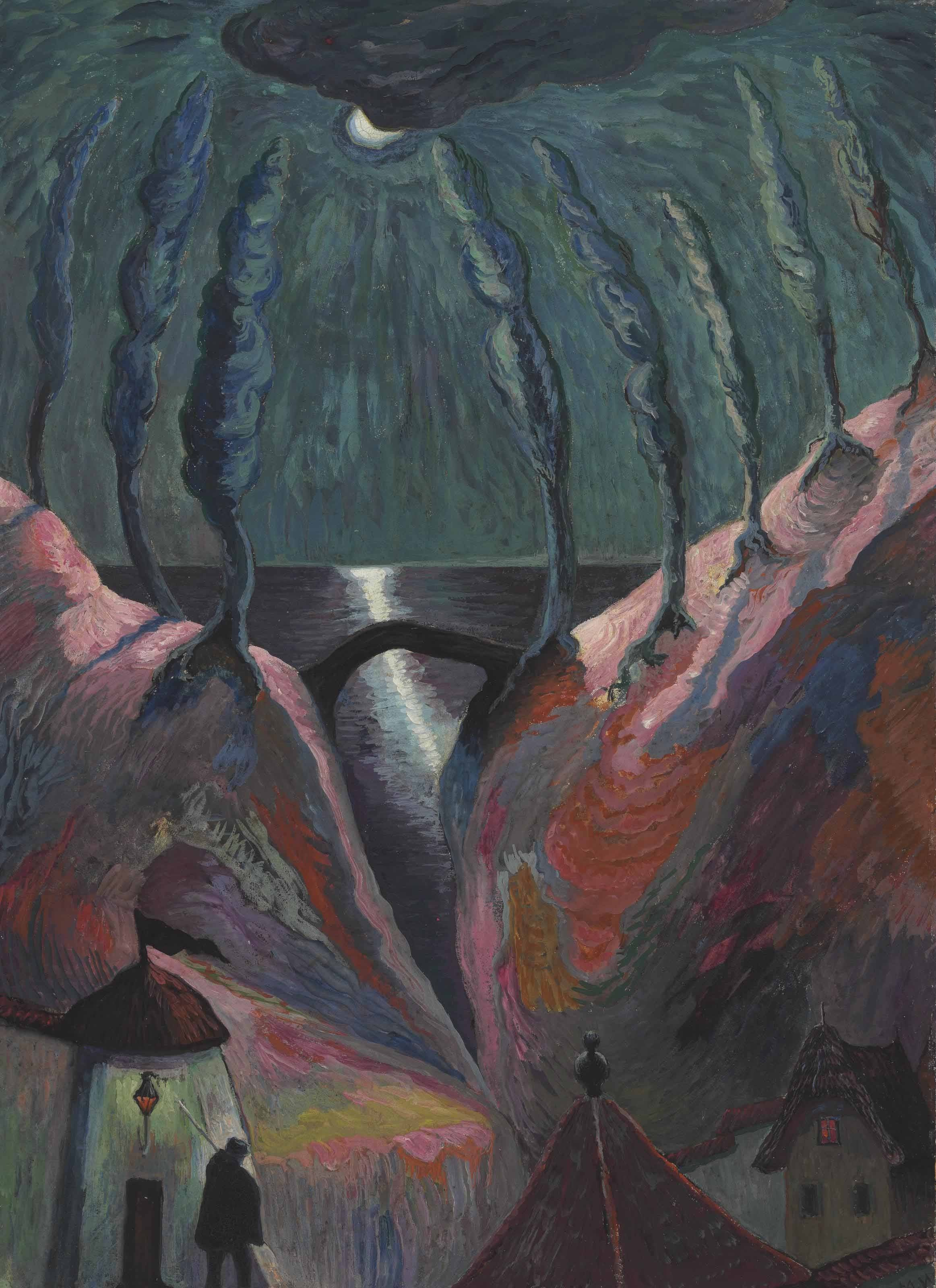
Fantastic Night, 1917, oil and tempera on cardboard

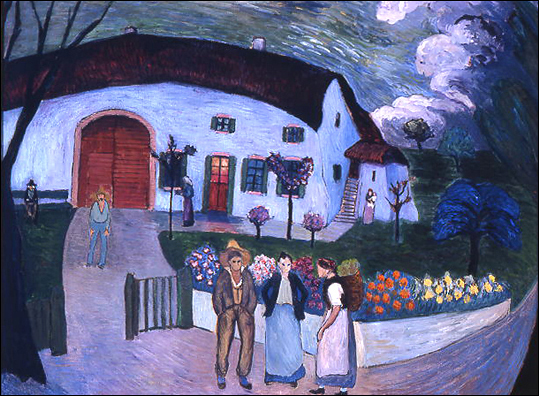
The Family (La Familia), 1922, tempera on cardboard

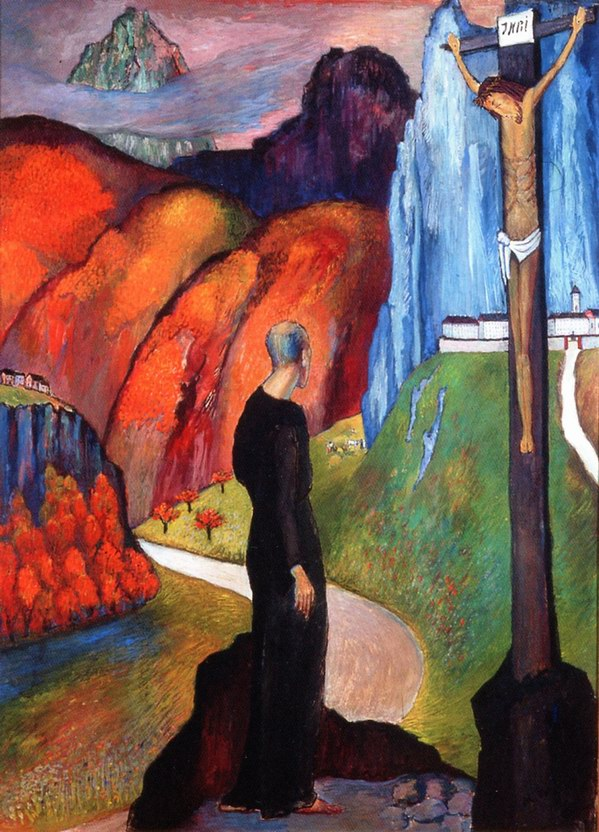
The Monk (Der Mönch), 1932, tempera on cardboard

== See also ==
- List of Russian artists

== Publications ==
- Werefkin, Marianne von (2011). Sharonkina-Vitek, Yelena (ed.). Письма к неизвестному [Lettres à un Inconnu] (in Russian). Moscow: Iskusstvo — XXI Vek. ISBN 978-5-98051-081-7.
