= Elisabeth Epstein =

Russian painter (1879–1956)

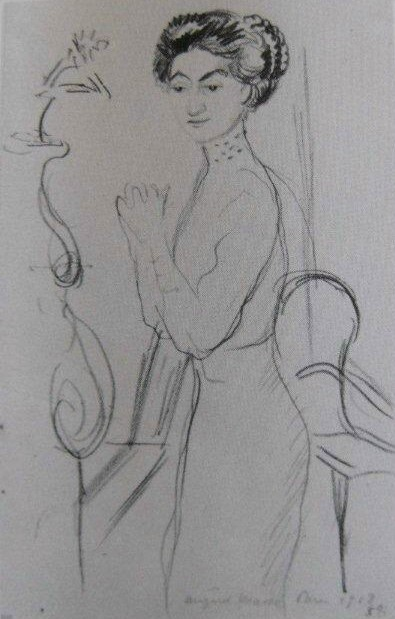
- Study by August Macke, 1912
- Born: Elisabeth Ivanowna Hefter; 27 February 1879; Zhitomir, Russian Empire
- Died: 22 January 1956 (aged 76); Geneva, Switzerland
- Known for: Painting
- Movement: Der Blaue Reiter
- Spouse: Meizyslaw Epstein (m. 1898; divorced in 1911)

Elisabeth Ivanowna Epstein (Russian: Елизавета Ивановна Эпштейн, romanized: Yelizaveta Ivanovna Epshteyn; née Hefter [Гефтер]; 27 February 1879 – 22 January 1956) was a Russian painter.

== Biography ==
Elisabeth Hefter (Gefter) was born on 27 February 1879 in Zhitomir (present-day Zhytomyr, Ukraine). Her family moved to Moscow, then she located to Munich. In 1898, she married Meizyslaw Epstein, with whom she has one child. Their son Alexander was born in Munich on 28 March 1899. The couple divorced in 1911. In Munich she studied with Anton Ažbe, Alexej von Jawlensky, and Wassily Kandinsky. She also attended the salons hosted by fellow artist Marianne von Werefkin. Her work was included in the first Neue Künstlervereinigung München exhibit in 1911.

Around 1907, Epstein moved to Paris and exhibited at the Salon d'Automne. While living in Paris Epstein introduced Kandinsky and Franz Marc to the French art world, and also facilitated the inclusion of the French painter Robert Delaunay's work in the traveling Der Blaue Reiter exhibition of 1911.

She died on 22 January 1956, aged 76, in Geneva.
