= Charles Johann Palmié =

German painter (1863-1911)

- Born: October 22, 1863; Aschersleben, Kingdom of Prussia
- Died: July 15, 1911 (aged 47); Munich, German Empire
- Citizenship: German
- Education: Academy of Fine Arts Dresden; Academy of Fine Arts, Munich
- Known for: Painting
- Movement: Pointillism; Neo-Impressionism
- Spouse: Marie Kapferer (m. 1886)

Charles Johann Palmié (1863–1911) was a pointillist/Neo-Impressionist painter noted for being a founding member with Wassily Kandinsky in 1909 of NKVM which prefigured Der Blaue Reiter, the first modernist secession, which is regarded as a forerunner and pathfinder for Modern art in 20th-century Germany. A few years earlier, in 1906, he painted with Claude Monet in Giverny, France.

== Biography ==
Palmié was born on October 22, 1863, in Aschersleben, Kingdom of Prussia. He was first trained from the age of 14 as a decorative painter under the court theater decoration painter Rieck in Dresden. Palmie then spent two years at the Dresden Academy of Fine Arts.

At age 20 in 1883 he received his first large commission work from today's Leonhardi Museum in Dresden, then owned by the painter Eduard Leonhardi, to do a rich colorful painting renovation in the romanticed style of the 19th century.

In 1884 Palmié moved from Dresden to Munich, where he completed his artistic education as a student of August Fink.

In 1886 he married the flower painter Marie Kapferer as he was now able to live on his income an independent artist, having built his reputation by being represented with work at an important exhibition in the new Munich Glass Palace (Glaspalast, Munich).

Palmie travelled to paint, first making regular trips to the Alps, then since the 1890s also making regular painting trips to the plains of the Altmühltal, the Wörnitz and the Danube, which inspired him to mostly large-scale paintings in the neo-impressionist style. Later he would travel to France.

1901 Palmie opened an inn, run by his wife, to cater to painters in Kallmünz Germany. Palmié called Kallmünz, on the Naab River, the "pearl of the Naabtal". Soon the artist colony numbered 38 painters with many settling permanently. Kallmünz became well known as a result of Wassily Kandinsky's and Gabriele Münter's stay in the summer of 1903.

Falling under the influence of Claude Monet in 1891 Palmie spent the summer of 1906 painting in Giverny, France, where he heightened his ability to capture shimmering light and atmosphere, taking a further step toward abstraction in art.

In 1909 Palmié, together with Wassily Kandinsky, Alexei Jawlensky, Gabriele Münter and others, became a founding member of the Neue Künstlervereinigung München, (Wassily Kandinsky was the chairman which later became Der Blaue Reiter). Palmie resigned before the first NKVM exhibition in the winter of 1909 because of artistic differences.

Two years later, Charles Palmié died of a sudden stroke on July 15, 1911, in Munich.
