= Erma Bossi =

German expressionist painter (1875–1952)

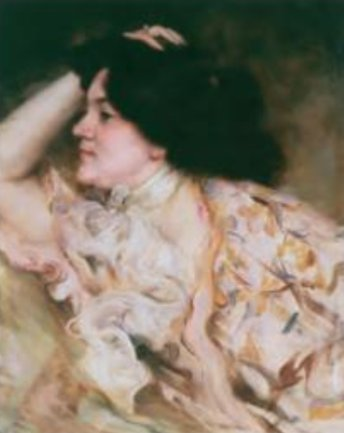
- Portrait of Erma Bossi by Carlo Wostry
- Born: Erma Barrera-Bossi; 9 June 1875; Pula, Austria-Hungary (now Croatia)
- Died: 14 April 1952 (aged 76); Milan, Italy
- Known for: Painting
- Movement: German Expressionism

Erma Bossi (1875–1952) was an Italian painter in the German Expressionist style.

== Biography ==
Bossi was born in 1875 in Pula. She studied art in Munich and was associated with Gabriele Münter and Wassily Kandinsky. She was a member of the Neue Künstlervereinigung München (Munich New Association of Artists).

She died in 1952 in Milan, Italy. Her work is in the collection of the Pinakothek der Moderne, the Kunsthalle Bremen, and the Kunsthalle Emden. In 2013 the Schlossmuseum Murnau held a retrospective of her work.
