= Moissey Kogan =

Russian Jewish sculptor and printmaker (1879–1943)

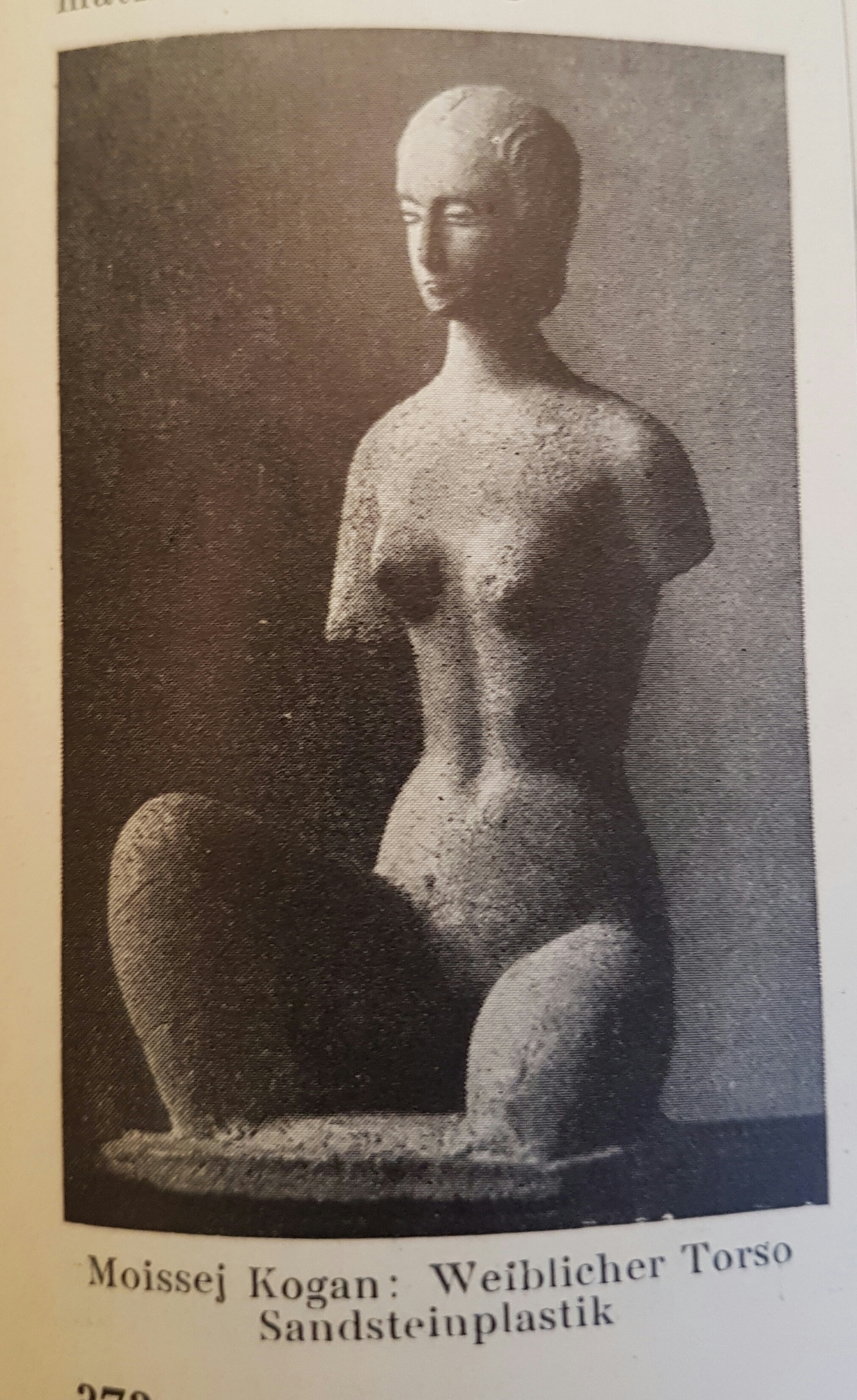
- Female Torso in sandstone
- Born: "משה כהן הכהן" (Hebrew and Yiddish: "Moshe Kohen HaKohen"); 12 March 1879; Orhei, Bessarabia
- Died: 3 March 1943 (aged 63); Auschwitz concentration camp, German-occupied Poland
- Known for: Drawing, lithography, etching, Sculpture, medal making

Moissey Kogan (12 March 1879 – 3 March 1943) was a Bessarabian Jewish medalist, sculptor and graphic artist who spent much of his time in Paris and travelled throughout Europe. He specialised in creating sculptures and graphic art based on the female form. The Moissey Kogan Catalogue Raisonné of Sculpture & Prints Project is in the process of compiling a scholarly catalogue raisonné of Moissey Kogan's sculpture and prints, and is preparing a comprehensive monograph on the artist's life and career. The Moissey Kogan Archive of the European Cultural Foundation, in Bonn, collects and captures the entire work of the artist. Kogan is sometimes confused with Russian painter Moisey Kogan (1924–2001), who specialized in colorful oil paintings of Russian village life, landscapes, churches etc.

Kogan was murdered in Auschwitz during the Holocaust.

== Biography ==
=== Early life ===
Moissey Kogan (also known as Moise, Moissej, Moshe) was born to a Jewish merchant in the town of Orhei. From an early age, he was interested in craftsmanship and acquired his artistic skills auto-didactically. In 1889, he moved to Nagybánya, an artist's colony in Hungary, where he was taught by the painter Simon Hollósy. From 1903, Kogan spent time in the Bavarian city of Munich, where he enrolled at the Munich Academy of Fine Arts, studying under the sculptor, Wilhelm von Rümann.

=== Artistic career ===
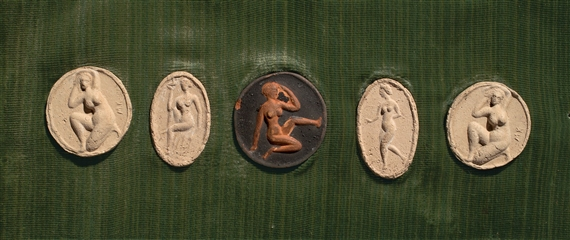
A Selection of medals produced by the artist Moissey Kogan

His artistic career began in 1908, when he exhibited for the first time in Paris, at the Salon d'Automne. The following year, he became one of the founding members of the Expressionist group Neue Künstlervereinigung. During this period in Paris, Kogan was supported by the sculptors Rodin and Maillol. His talents were noticed by the art collector and patron Karl Ernst Osthaus, who worked for Kogan in later years, and offered the young artist a teaching position at the Folkwang Museum in Hagen. This situation was short-lived, and Kogan moved back to Munich, and then Paris, At the invitation of Henry van de Velde, he briefly taught at the Kunstgewerbeschule in Weimar. He led a transient life during this period, and lived variously in Switzerland and Berlin as well. In Berlin, he was promoted by the prominent art-historian Max Sauerlandt and in the 1920s, Kogan's art was exhibited alongside artists from the Berlin Secession.

Kogan mixed mainly in artistic circles, and maintained relationships with figures such as Kandinsky, Jawlensky and Maillol. He was an active participant in the Salon d'Automme, where he served on the jury and was eventually elected vice-president of the sculptural department in 1925. From 1925 until his death, he varied his time between Paris and the Netherlands, where he had connections with collectors and artisans. In 1933, he ceased travel to Germany on account of the increasingly anti-Semitic atmosphere, indeed some of his works were exhibited at the Entartete Kunst exhibition in Berlin, 1938.

From the late 1930s, Kogan began to withdraw from public life. On 11 February 1943, he was deported from Drancy internment camp to Auschwitz concentration camp, where he was murdered two weeks later. It wasn't until the 1960s that his fate was discovered.

=== Work ===
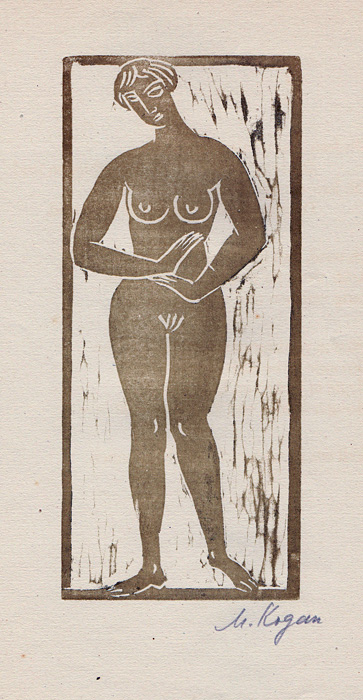
Illustration für das Buch Jizo. Galerie Flechtheim, Berlin 1922

Kogan began his career working with gems, producing medals, plaques, vases, embroidery and drawings. He subsequently turned to sculpture after his time in Paris and acquaintance with the sculptors Maillol and Rodin. He became interested in the female form and the concept of grace. The majority of his work consists of small sculptures and reliefs in the neoclassical style. At first he worked with terracotta, later moving to gypsum. He very rarely worked with bronze, due to the expense of the material. Kogan did not date his work, and so it isn't possible to ascertain the years of origin today. In the 1920s, Kogan produced numerous wood and lino-cuts as well as etchings. In his drawings, he worked with chalk, coal, and pencils. Despite this versatility, Kogan infuriated the gallery owner and art-dealer Daniel-Henry Kahnweiler, who insisted that he worked incredibly slowly, and very rarely finished his commissions on time.

According to the art-historian Gerhart Söhn:

The fragile grace of his figures, their sensual and spiritual body language are of Hellenistic-looking cheerfulness. The inner restlessness that Kogan has driven around his life has come to rest in his art. The quiet world of his work is timeless, and yet he maintains himself alongside the great currents of contemporary sculpture. Kogan's graphic works are also devoted exclusively to female figures. The visual language is the same as in the sculptural works. The soft contours and lines of the body determine the composition of the picture, not infrequently at the expense of anatomical correctness. Even expressive expressions avoid everything that is angular.

Kogan's works are in many museums, including the Stedelijk Museum in Amsterdam, the Lehmbruck Museum in Duisburg, the Kunsthalle Bremen and in the art collection of the Essen Folkwang Museum. He's also in the Kunstmuseum Moritzburg Halle (Saale), in the Hamburg Museum of Arts and Crafts, The Haubrich Collection at the Ludwig Museum in Cologne and the Städtische Galerie at Lenbachhaus in Munich. He is also in the collection of MoMA.
