= Neue Künstlervereinigung München =

Artist group

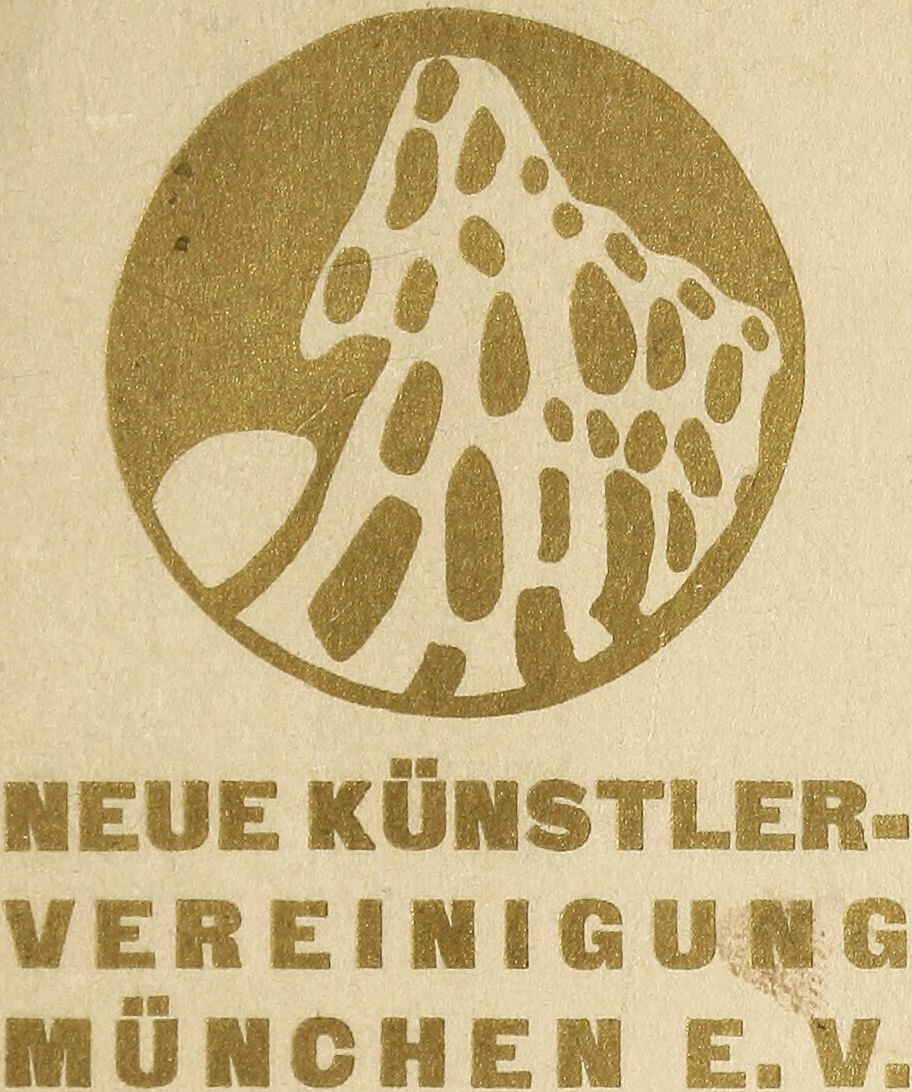
Logo of the N.K.V.M.

The Neue Künstlervereinigung München (N.K.V.M.), ("New Artists' Association Munich") was an Expressionism art group based in Munich. The registered association was formed in 1909 and prefigured Der Blaue Reiter (The Blue Rider), the first modernist secession which is regarded as a forerunner and pathfinder for Modern art in 20th-century Germany.

== Historical background ==
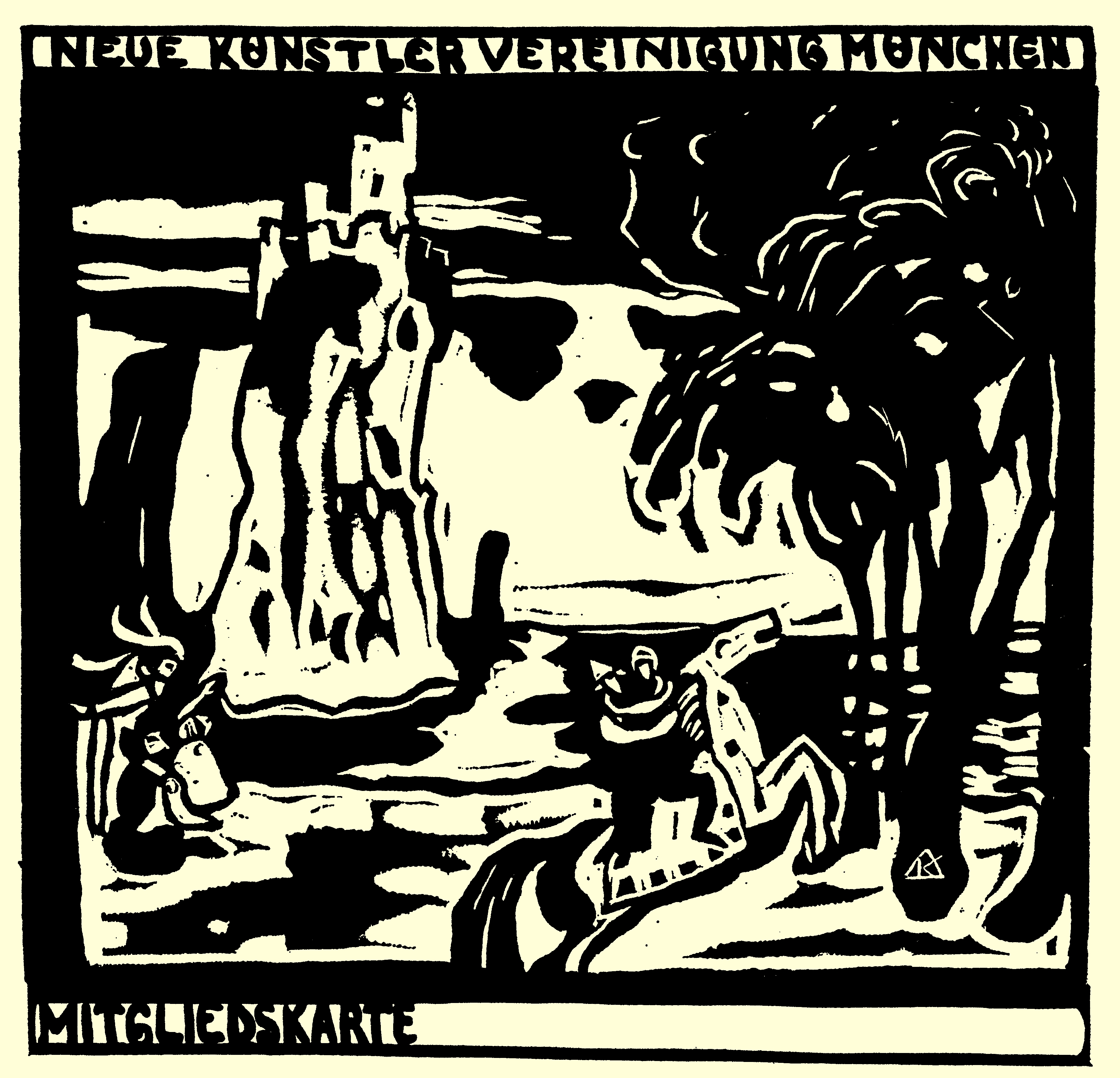
Membership card of the N.K.V.M. Wassily Kandinsky: Woodcut Rocks

=== The idea for the N.K.V.M. ===
The precursor to the N.K.V.M. was the "Brotherhood of St. Luke", which the Russian painter Marianne von Werefkin had gathered around her in 1897 in her adopted home of Munich in the district of Schwabing in her "pink salon". The members saw themselves as standing in the tradition of the Guild of Saint Luke. Already at that time, one planned "Manifestations, that is, Exhibitions".

The idea for the N.K.V.M. was also born in Werefkin's salon (before Christmas 1908). Apart from Werefkin, Alexej von Jawlensky, Adolf Erbslöh and the German entrepreneur, art collector, aviation pioneer and musician Oscar Wittenstein were involved in founding "the new artists' association". Gabriele Münter and Wassily Kandinsky were initially not informed of the project. This annoyed Kandinsky years later, which to a certain extent explains his hesitation when he was offered to take over the chairmanship of the N.K.V.M. in January 1909.

=== Foundation, members and goals ===
On 22 January 1909, the founding statutes was written. Initially, the members were: Vladimir Georgievich Bekhteev (a.k.a. Wladimir von Bechtejeff), Th. E. Buttler, Adolf Erbslöh, Leonhard Frank, Gustav Freytag, Thomas de Hartmann, Alexej von Jawlensky, Wassily Kandinsky, Alexander Kanoldt, Marga Kanoldt-Zerener, Johanna Kanoldt, Alfred Kubin, Gabriele Münter, Charles Johann Palmié, Hugo Schimmel, art historian Heinrich Schnabel, Marianne von Werefkin and Oscar Wittenstein. In the same year Paul Baum, Erma Bossi, Pierre Girieud, Karl Hofer, Moissey Kogan and the Russian dancer Alexander Sacharoff joined the association. Of these, over the course of the year, Baum, Buttler, Frank, Kanoldt-Zerener, Palmié and Schimmel dropped out.

The following were elected to the board: Kandinsky as the first chairman, Jawlensky as the second, Johanna Kanoldt as deputy, Wittenstein as the first secretary, and Johanna Kanoldt as treasurer. On 10 May, the N.K.V.M. was registered in the municipal register of associations in Munich.

In a circular letter to influential personalities bearing the signet of the artists' association, the artists' group made aware, among other things, their goals:

We start from the idea that the artist, in addition to the impressions he receives from the outer world, from nature, is constantly collecting experiences in an inner world; and the search for artistic forms which should express the interpenetration of all these experiences - for forms which must be stripped of all extraneous to express strongly only what is necessary - in short, the striving for artistic synthesis, this seems to us a slogan that is currently uniting more and more artists spiritually.

Kandinsky had introduced a paragraph into the statutes of the N.K.V.M. the "four square meter clause" - that would give him the lever to leave the association in 1911:

Each full member has the right to exhibit two works jury free, provided that these [two pictures] together do not exceed the area of 4 square meters (2 x 2 m).

In 1910, Erbslöh was appointed secretary of the N.K.V.M. When the conservative forces in the N.K.V.M. increasingly had disagreements, which were sparked by Kandinsky's increasingly abstract painting - he was asked to produce "preferably understandable works" - he resigned as chairman in January 1911. Erbslöh became his successor. Also in January, Franz Marc became a member and third chairman of the N.K.V.M. At the general assembly on 4 February, the members of the artists' association elected Wittenstein as second chairman, Alexander Kanoldt as first secretary, Schnabel as second secretary and Johanna Kanoldt as treasurer.

The first exhibition showed the original group and artists invited; the second exhibition expanded to include French and Russian avant-garde artists such as Pablo Picasso, Georges Braque; the third and final exhibition excluded most of the previous exhibitors, especially the secessionists of Der Blaue Reiter who launched their parallel exhibition in the same gallery, as a result of tensions within the N.K.V.M.

== 1st Exhibition: "Turnus 1909–1910" ==
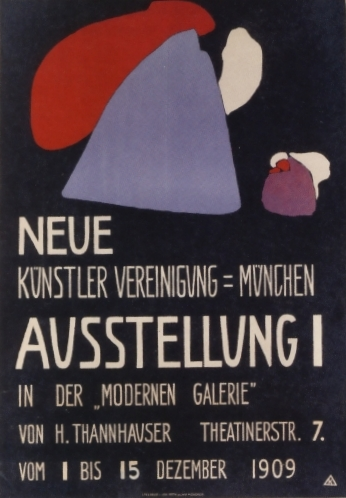
Exhibition poster for the 1st exhibition at the Thannhauser Gallery, Munich

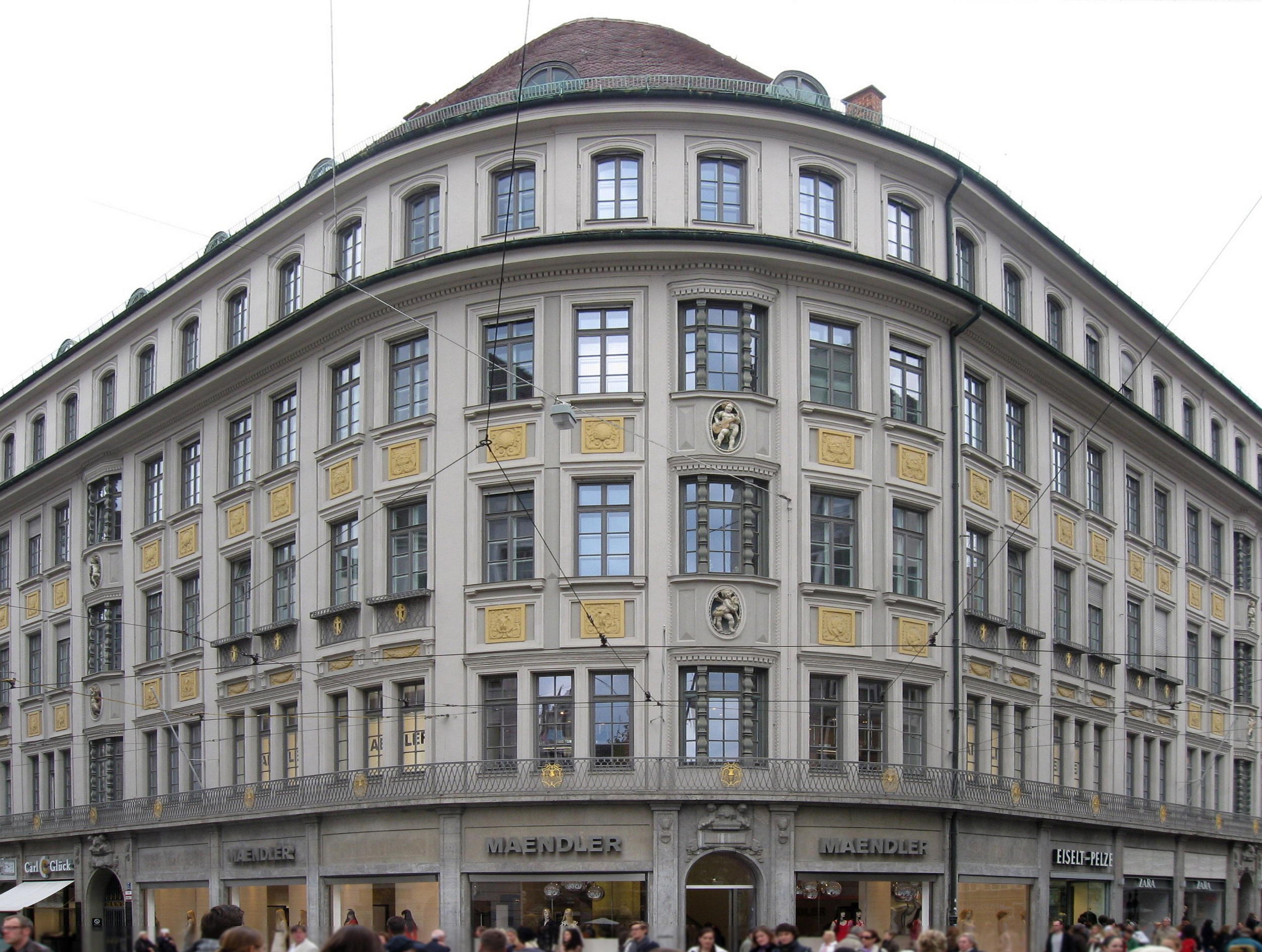
Arco-Palais, Theatinerstraße 7, in Munich, where the 1st exhibition was held in Heinrich Thannhauser's Modern Gallery, between 1st-15th December 1909

The catalogue of the first N.K.V.M. exhibition lists 128 items by 16 artists: Paul Baum, Vladimir Georgievich Bekhteev, Erma Bossi, Dresler, Eckert, Erbslöh, Pierre Girieud, Karl Hofer, Jawlensky, Kandinsky, Kanoldt, Kogan, Alfreds Kubin, Münter, Pohle, Werefkin, and is accompanied by 14 reproductions and a list of prices.

On view beginning on December 1, 1909, at the Moderne Galerie in Munich, this exhibition traveled to 9 venues:

- December 1–15, 1909: Munich, Moderne Galerie Heinrich Thannhauser
- Brünn
- Elberfeld
- Barmen
- Hamburg
- Düsseldorf
- Wiesbaden
- Schwerin
- Frankfurt am Main.

It received mainly negative criticism from the local press.

== 2nd Exhibition: "Turnus 1910–1911" ==
The catalogue of the second N.K.V.M. exhibition lists 115 items by 29 artists: Bechtejew, Bossi, Braque, Derain, Kees van Dongen, Durio, Erbslöh, Le Fauconnier, Girieud, Haller, Hoetger, Jawlensky, von Kahler, Kandinsky, Kanoldt, Kogan, Kubin, Alexander Mogilewski, Münter, Nieder, Picasso, Rouault, Scharff, de Vlaminck, Werefkin, David Burljuk, Wladimir Burljuk, Denissoff, Soudbinine, and is accompanied by 20 reproductions and 2 pages of advertisements.

On view from September 1, 1910, at the Moderne Galerie in Munich, this exhibition visited 8 venues in:

- Moderne Galerie Munich
- Karlsruhe, Mannheim
- Hagen
- Paul Cassirer Berlin
- Leipzig
- Galerie Arnold Dresden
- Munich Weimar
- Neue Secession Berlin

== 3rd Exhibition: "Turnus 1911–1912" ==
The third and final N.K.V.M. exhibition showed 58 paintings by 8 artists: Erma Barrera-Bossi, Wladimir von Bechtejeff, Adolf Erbslöh, Pierre Girieud, Alexej von Jawlensky, Alexander Kanoldt, Moissey Kogan and Marianne von Werefkin, and 8 illustrations – one for each participant.

On view from December 18, 1911, at the Moderne Galerie in Munich, this exhibition originally was intended for 8 or 9 venues, but probably ceased to travel after the 2nd venue:

- December 18, 1911 – January 1, 1912: Munich/München, Moderne Galerie
- Zürich & Bremen (?)
- Köln
- Elberfeld
- Mannheim
- Munich, Secession
- Heidelberg
- Frankfurt am Main
- Jena
- Breslau
