= Adolf Erbslöh =

German painter (1881–1947)

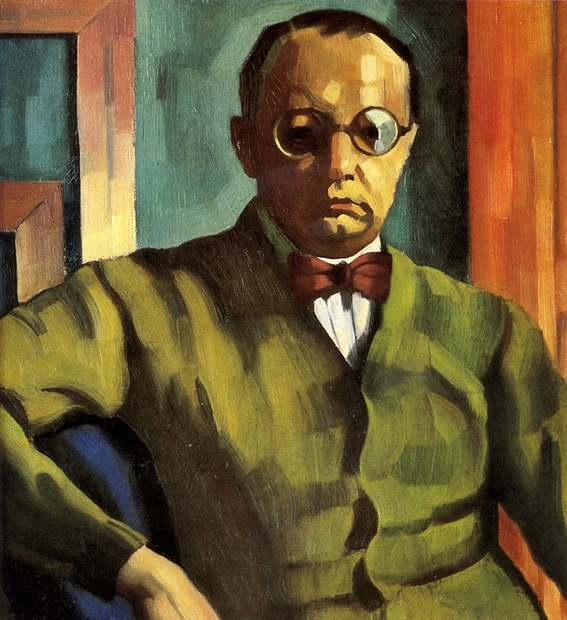
- Self-portrait (1928)
- Born: May 27, 1881; New York City, New York, U.S.
- Died: May 2, 1947 (aged 65); Icking, Bavaria, Allied-occupied Germany
- Education: State Academy of Fine Arts Karlsruhe; Academy of Fine Arts, Munich
- Known for: Paintings
- Movement: Expressionism, New Objectivity

Adolf Erbslöh (27 May 1881, New York – 2 May 1947, Icking) was a German Expressionist painter; one of the founders of the Neue Künstlervereinigung München.

== Biography ==
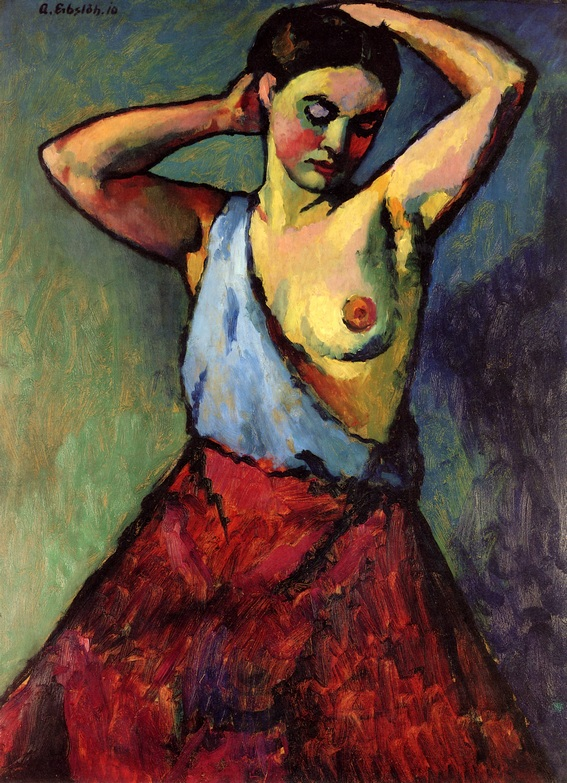
Girl with a Red Skirt

He was born to a merchant family; originally from Barmen. His father, Gustav Adolf (1844–1900), was a junior partner in the export firm, Dieckerhoff, Raffloer & Co., and spent fifteen years at their New York office; returning to Barmen in 1887. Adolf received commercial training, although he displayed some talent for drawing. The year after his father's death, he abandoned his business career to attend the Academy of Fine Arts, Karlsruhe, where he studied with Ernst Schurth and Ludwig Schmid-Reutte. In 1905, he continued his studies at the Academy of Fine Arts, Munich, with Ludwig von Herterich.

In 1907, he married his second cousin, Adeline Schuchard (1880–1974), the daughter of Hugo Schuchard, who owned a large import-export business. The following year, he came up with the plan for the "Neue Künstlervereinigung München" (NKVM), which was chartered in 1909. He initially served as its Secretary. Their first informal showing was in Barmen, followed by a public exhibition at the Galerie Heinrich Thannhauser in Munich. Their first museum exhibition was in 1910, at what is now the Von der Heydt Museum in Wuppertal. That same year, he was elected the association's Chairman, upon the resignation of Wassily Kandinsky, who helped co-found a competing art group, "Der Blaue Reiter". In 1913, he participated in creating the Münchener Neue Secession, with some of his associates from the NKVM and former members of the Munich Secession. They held their first exhibition in 1914.

He was conscripted in 1915; serving in Flanders and France. The following year, he was chosen to be a war painter for the regimental staff in Verdun but, as there was no such official position for non-commissioned officers, he was employed as an assistant clerk. His drawings from the field show portraits of his war comrades, forests and houses that had been destroyed. The colors of his oil paintings from that time were generally dull and pale. He returned to Munich in 1919.

Shortly after, he and Adeline took a trip through Westphalia, where he composed an album of sketches. In the 1920s, he turned to the New Objectivity; an art movement that was a reaction against Expressionism. A major feature of the new style was a return to lighting and shading effects, which the Expressionists had disdained.

His last solo exhibition during his lifetime took place in 1931. A joint exhibition was planned for 1934, but had to be cancelled because most of the works by former NKVM members were declared to be "Degenerate". In 1937, four of his paintings were confiscated from public collections and destroyed. After that, he retired to his home near Icking and avoided any publicity. He remained in seclusion until his death in 1947.

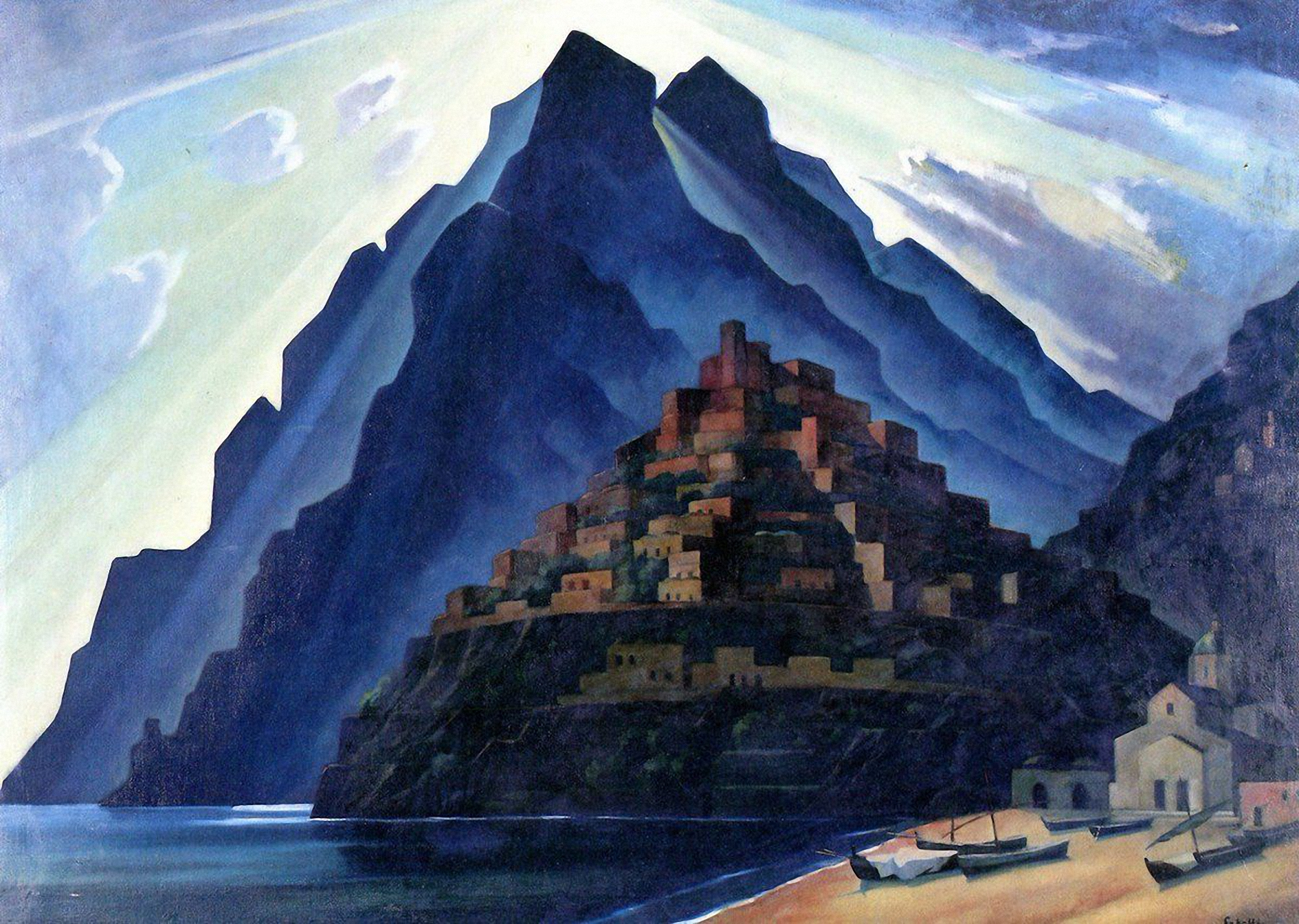
Positano
