= Alexander Kanoldt =

German artist (1881–1939)

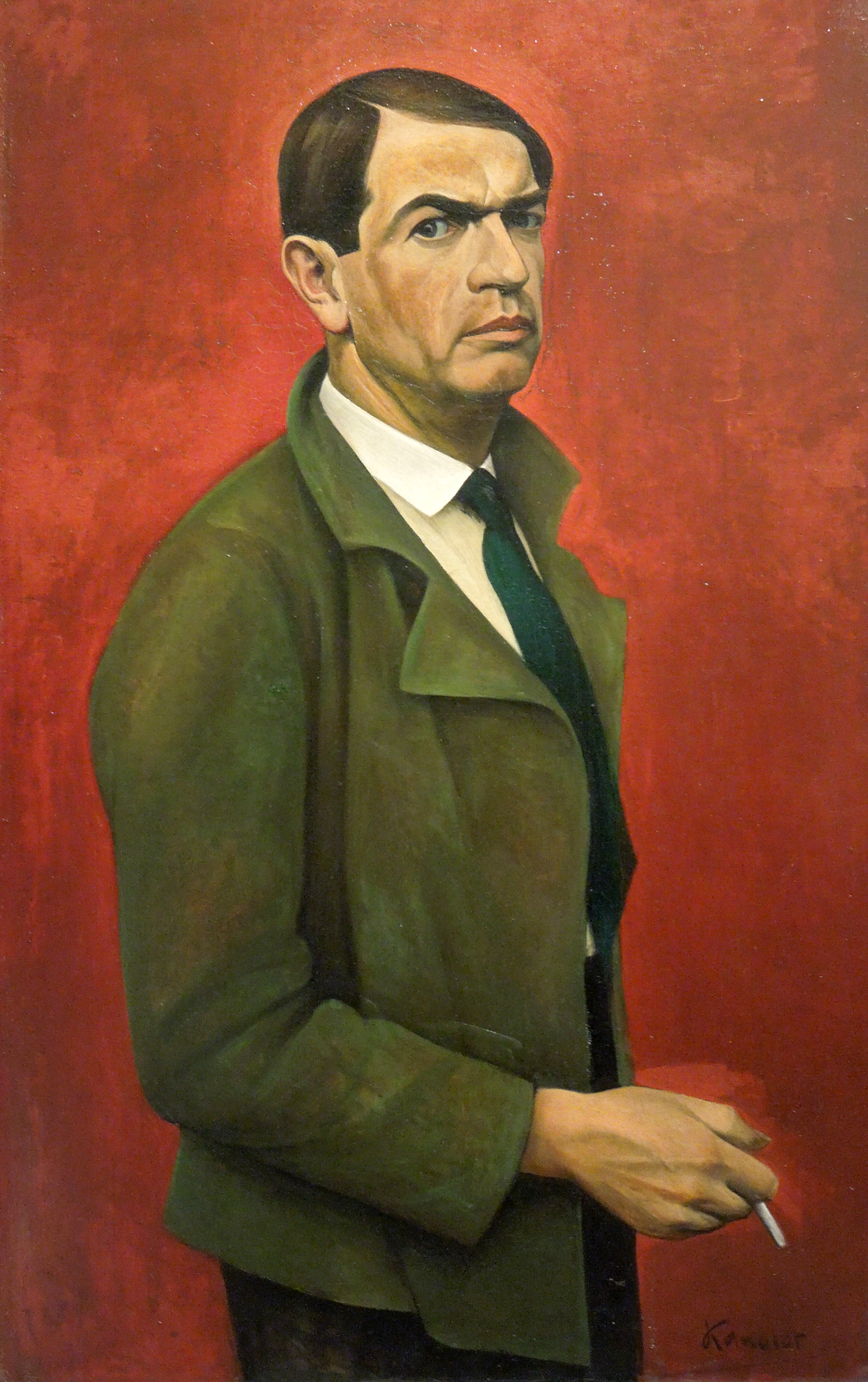
- Born: September 29, 1881; Karlsruhe, Baden-Württemberg, Germany
- Died: January 24, 1939 (aged 57); Berlin, Germany
- Education: Academy of Fine Arts Karlsruhe
- Occupation: painter

Alexander Kanoldt (29 September 1881 – 24 January 1939) was a German magic realist painter and one of the artists of the New Objectivity.

== Early life and education ==
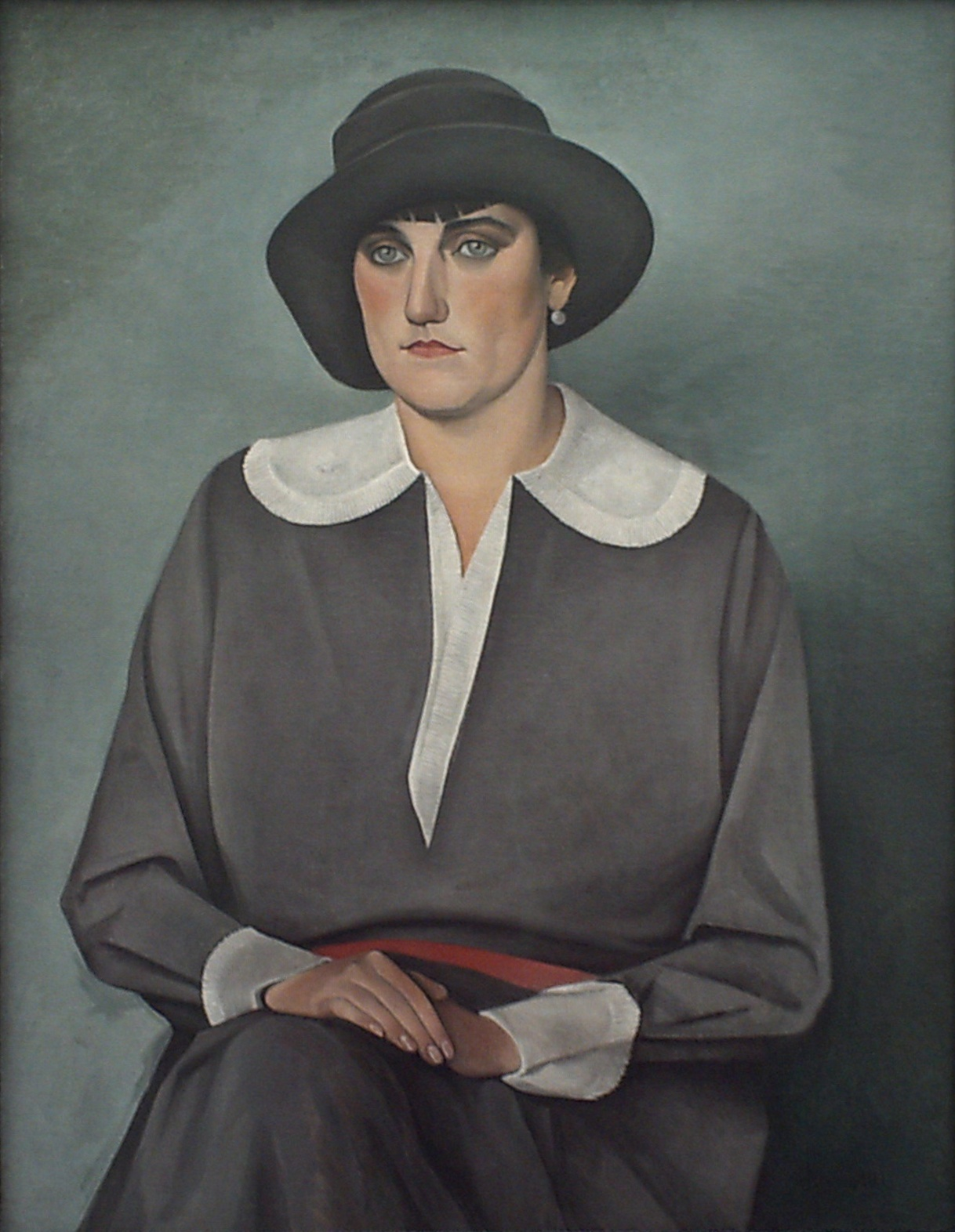
Kanoldt, Der rote Gürtel (English: The Red Belt) (1929)

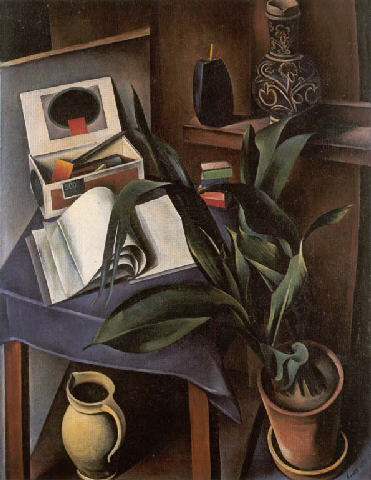
Kanoldt, Still Life II (1922)

Alexander Kanoldt was born on 29 September 1881 in Karlsruhe in Baden-Württemberg, Germany. His father was the painter Edmund Kanoldt, a late practitioner of the Nazarene style.

After studies at the Academy of Fine Arts Karlsruhe he went to Munich in 1908, where he met a number of modernists such as Alexej von Jawlensky, Wassily Kandinsky and Gabriele Münter. He became a member of the Munich New Secession in 1913, with Jawlensky and Paul Klee.

== Career ==
Following military service in World War I from 1914 to 1918, the still lifes Kanoldt painted show the influence of Derain and an adaptation of cubist ideas.

By the early 1920s Kanoldt developed the manner for which he is best known, a magic realist rendering of potted plants, angular tins, fruit and mugs on tabletops. He also painted portraits in the same severe style, as well as geometrical landscapes. In 1925 he was made a professor at Breslau Academy of Arts, a post he held until 1931. During this time he came into conflict with the Bauhaus faction at the academy, and he was increasingly at odds with the avant garde. From 1933 until his resignation in 1936 he was the director of the State School of Art in Berlin.

With the rise of the Nazi regime in 1933 Kanoldt attempted accommodation, painting in a romantic style, but nonetheless many of his works were seized by the authorities as degenerate art in 1937.

He died in Berlin on 24 January 1939.

== See also ==
- Magic realism
