= Robert Genin =

Russian-born painter (1884–1941)

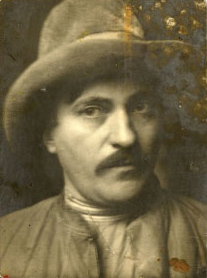
- Robert Genin, beginning of the 1920s
- Born: August 11, 1884; Vysokoye, near Klimovichi in the Region of Mogilev, Russian Empire
- Died: August 16, 1941 (aged 57); Moscow, USSR
- Occupation: Artist
- Spouse: Martha Genin née Karpow (m. 1907) Margarete Genin née Gurth (m. 1920)

Robert Genin (Russian: Роберт Генин; French: Robert Guénine; born 11 August 1884 in Vysokoye near Klimovichi in the Region of Mogilev, now Belarus; died 16 August 1941 in Moscow) was a Russian artist, painter, draftsman, and illustrator of Jewish origin, who lived in the Russian Empire, Germany, France, Switzerland and the USSR.

== Biography ==
Born on 11 August 1884 in the family of a Jewish tradesman, Genin studied art in Vilna (1898–1900) and in Odessa (1900–1902). At the end of 1902 he moved to Munich where for a couple of weeks he attended the school of Anton Ažbe. In 1903, he moved to Paris, where he lived in La Ruche from 1905 to 1907. In Paris, he admired the art of Puvis de Chavannes, and many notable early works of Genin (until 1914) bear his influence.

In 1907, Genin returned to Munich and began to work for the magazine Jugend, where 40 of his illustrations were published. In 1912, he became one of the founding members of the artists group Sema, and in 1913 became a member of the Münchener neue Secession. The outbreak of the First World War (1914–1918) was a disastrous turn for this rise in the German art scene, and during the war Genin was interned in Munich as citizen of a hostile state. After the war he moved to Berlin.

In 1919, Genin has acquired a small house in the fishing village of Ascona in Switzerland, where he subsequently spent several months each year.

Over the period of 1915–1926, the Genin's styles of painting and drawing developed in line with the direction of German expressionism.

In 1926, Genin undertook a voyage to the island of Bali, which provided important impulse to his work. Genin wrote and illustrated a book about his impressions, which was published 1928.

In 1929, Genin moved to Paris. There, his artistic style developed further under the influence of Fauvism and Neo-primitivism.

In 1936, Genin finally returned to the USSR, with the intention of taking an active part in building up the new socialist society by painting frescos on the walls of Moscow's new buildings. In March of that year, while Genin was already in Moscow, his first (and the last) American exhibition was held in NYC at Lilienfeld Galleries.

In Moscow, his first major commission was a fresco for one of the pavilions at the All-Union Agricultural Exhibition (VSKhV). However, in October 1938, the fresco was covered up, in line with the political processes which had gained strength in the USSR. His second major commission in Moscow was frescoes for the Palace of Soviets, a commission which was terminated by the outbreak of the Second World War. Genin committed suicide in August 1941, a few days after a devastating air raid by German bombers.

== Monograph and catalogue-raisonné ==
During his life, Genin did not take care of his works, their integrity and preservation. Some of them he destroyed by his own hands, and many were lost during the Second World War. During the Nazi era in Germany, some of his works were removed from museums along with other so called degenerate art, and others belonging to Jewish art collectors were confiscated. Those works which survived after Second World War are widely spread. Information about them is being collected by Friends club of Robert Genin with the aim of publishing the monograph and the catalogue-raisonné.

== Solo exhibitions during his lifetime ==
- 1913, Munich, Moderne Galerie Thannhauser (with catalogue)
- 1917, Munich, Moderne Galerie Thannhauser, 1st floor - paintings, 2nd floor - graphics (with catalogue)
- 1922, Berlin, Alfred Flechtheim Galeries
- 1928, Cologne, Kunstgewerbemuseum
- 1931, Paris, Galerie Jacques Bonjean
- 1932, Amsterdam, Galerie Kunstzalen A. Vecht
- 1936, New York, Lilienfeld Galleries (with catalogue)

== Major museum collections ==
- Kunstmuseum Basel, Basel
- Ostdeutsche Galerie, Regensburg
- RGALI, Moscow
- Art Institute of Chicago, Chicago
- Pushkin Museum, Moscow
- Berlinische Galerie, Berlin
- Museum Ludwig, Cologne
- Von der Heydt Museum, Wuppertal
- Lenbachhaus, Munich
- Belarusian National Arts Museum, Minsk
- MOMA, New-York

== Major publications about him ==
- 1914 Burger, Fritz. Robert Genin – München// Deutsche Kunst und Dekoration, 1914, 1, Heft 4, S. 288–296. (in German)
- 1931 Fierens, Paul. Guenine or childhood regained// Formes, 1931, No.19, p. 157-161. (versions in English and in French)
- 2011 Родионов, Алексей. Художник Роберт Генин (1884–1941). Творчество и судьба// Бюллетень Музея Марка Шагала, 2011, No.19-20, с. 137–156. (in Russian)
- 2011 Fischer, Matthias. Der Briefwechsel mit Robert Genin// Sie lieber Herr Im Obersteg sind unser Schweizer für alles, Kunstmuseum Basel, 2011, S. 41–75. (in German)
- 2013 Rodionov, Alexej. Robert Genin. Auf der Suche nach dem Paradies: Bali, 1926. St-Petersburg, 2013, 96 S. (versions in German and in Russian)
- 2019 Robert Genin (1884–1941). Russischer Expressionist in München. Ausstellungskatalog. Hrsg. vom Schloßmuseum Murnau. 2019. 216 S. (versions in German or in Russian)

== Gallery ==
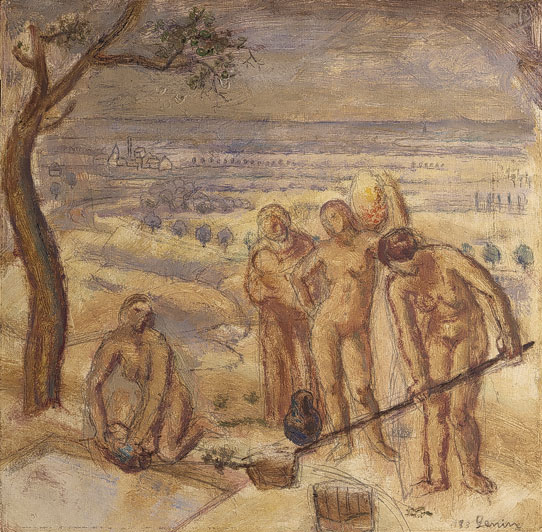
Women at work (ca. 1912). Collection Im Obersteg in Kunstmuseum Basel

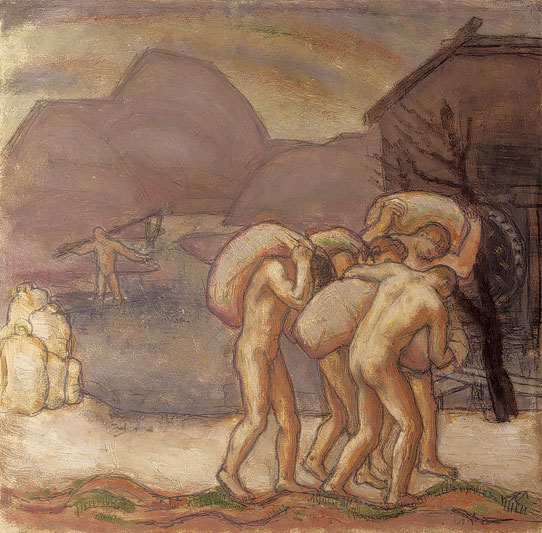
Men at work (ca. 1912). Collection Im Obersteg in Kunstmuseum Basel

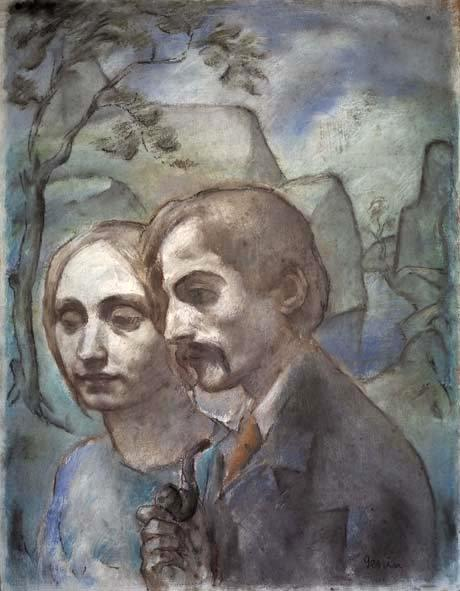
Self-portrait with his wife Martha, Pastell (1913). Kunstforum Ostdeutsche Galerie, Regensburg

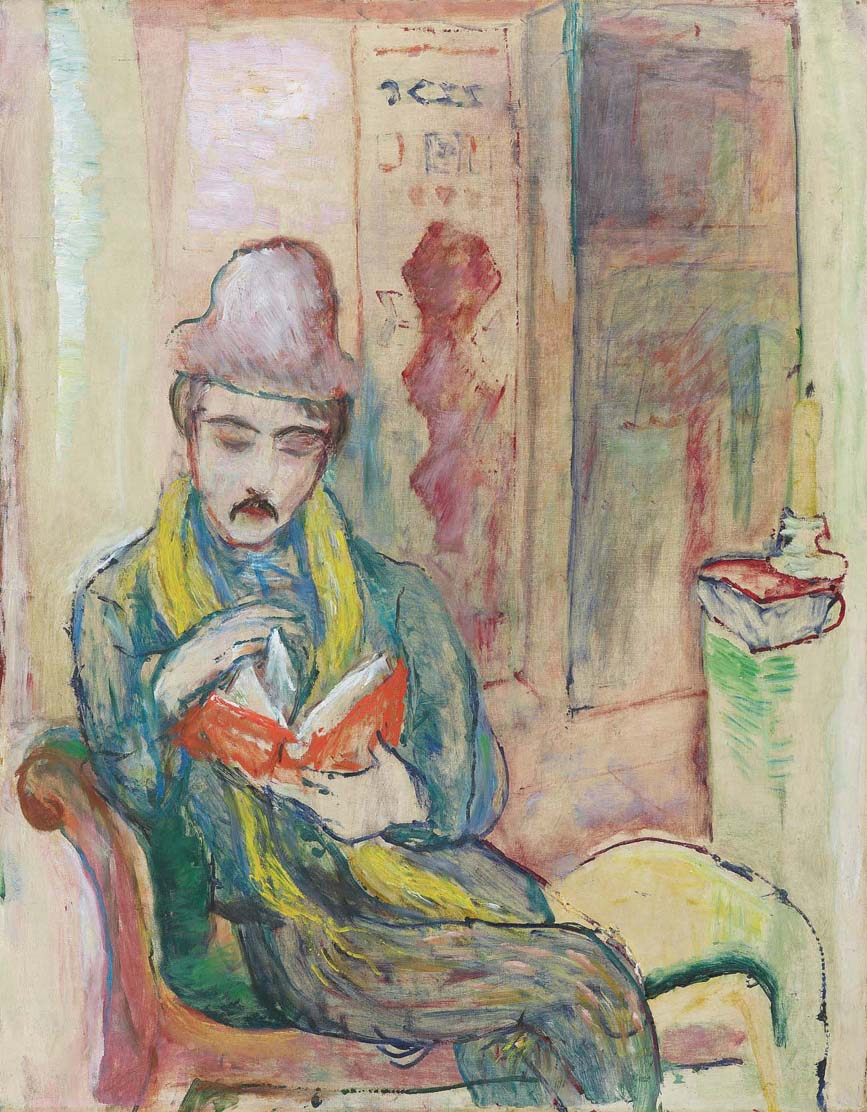
Portrait of Charlie Chaplin (1921)

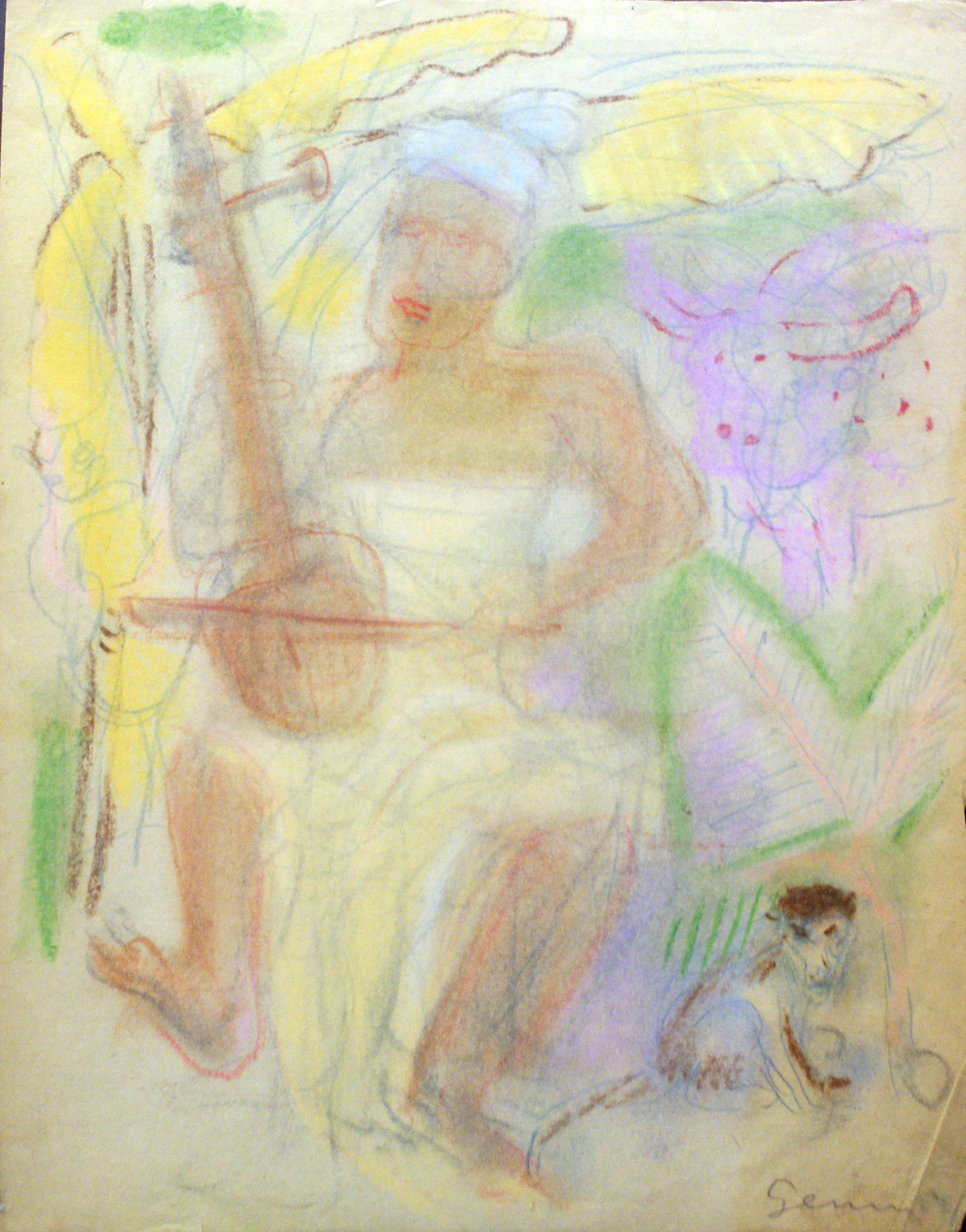
Musician with purple bull and monkey (1926)

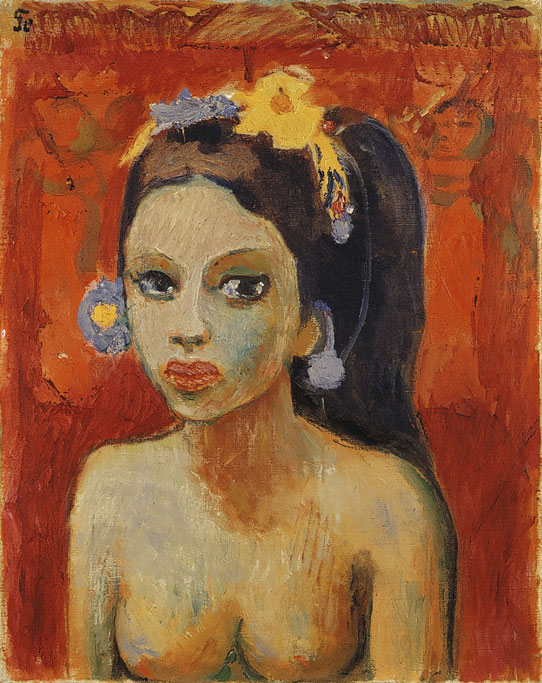
Balinese (1926). Collection Im Obersteg in Kunstmuseum Basel

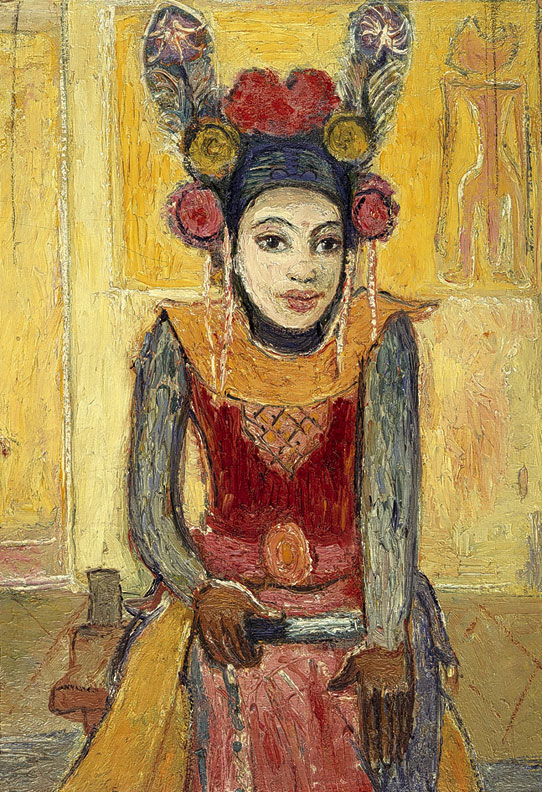
Legong dancer (1926). Collection Im Obersteg in Kunstmuseum Basel

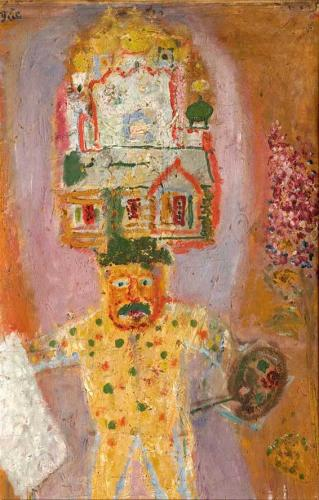
Self-portrait with church (1930)
