= Hildegard Reinhardt =

German translator and art historian (born 1942)

Hildegard Reinhardt (born 14 December 1942) is a German translator and art historian.

== Life ==
Born in Hagen, Reinhardt was a graduate translator at the University of Mainz from 1969-2006. She completed her studies of art history and Romance studies at the Rheinische Friedrich-Wilhelms-Universität Bonn with the rank Magister Artium in 1974. She received her doctorate in 1987 with the dissertation Gustav Wunderwald (1882–1945) – Untersuchungen zum bildkünstlerischen Gesamtwerk.

In addition to her freelance work as a curator, she writes articles for exhibition catalogues and specialist and popular science publications, especially on women visual artists of the Expressionism and the Social realism (among others Lea Grundig, Sella Hasse, Marta Hegemann, Grethe Jürgens, Victoria, Princess Royal, Elfriede Lohse-Wächtler, Marie von Malachowski-Nauen, Jeanne Mammen, Olga Oppenheimer, Gerta Overbeck, Henriette Schmidt-Bonn, Fifi Kreutzer, Elisabeth Epstein, Elisabeth Erdmann-Macke and the dancer Tatjana Barbakoff).

== Publications ==
- Published with Margarethe Jochimsen: Elisabeth Erdmann-Macke: Begegnungen. Bielefeld 2009.
- „…das oft aufsteigende Gefühl des Verlassenseins“, Arbeiten der Malerin Elfriede Lohse-Wächtler in den Psychiatrien von Hamburg-Friedrichsberg (1929) und Arnsdorf (1932–1940). ISBN 978-3865724779 Dresden 2000.
- Jeanne Mammen, Das symbolistische Frühwerk 1908–1914., Berlin 2002.
- Gustav Wunderwald und Wilhelm Schmidtbonn, Dokumente einer Freundschaft 1908–1929. Bonn 1980 (Publications of the Stadtarchiv Bonn, vol. 24).
- Gustav Wunderwald (1882–1945) – Untersuchungen zum bildkünstlerischen Gesamtwerk. Hildesheim, Zürich, New York 1988.
- Die Abstraktion ist kein Anfang, sondern ein mögliches Ziel, in Ab nach München. Künstlerinnen um 1900, Munich 2014 (Auss. Kat. des Stadtmuseums Museum).
