= Jochimsen =

Jochimsen is a surname. Notable people with the surname include:

- Luc Jochimsen (born 1936), German television journalist and politician of The Left party
- Margarethe Jochimsen (1931-2016), German curator, art critic, and museum director
