= Elisabeth Erdmann-Macke =

German writer (1888–1978)

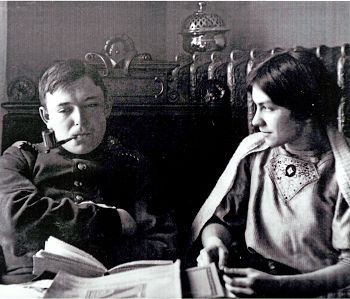
- August Macke and Elisabeth Gerhardt photographed in Bonn during 1908
- Born: Elisabeth Gerhardt; 11 May 1888; Bonn, German Empire
- Died: 17 March 1978 (aged 89); Berlin, Germany
- Other name: Elisabeth Macke
- Occupation: Writer
- Spouses: August Macke; Lothar Erdmann

Elisabeth Erdmann-Macke (née Gerhardt; 11 May 1888 – 17 March 1978) was a German writer who focused on memoirs of her time as the wife of the expressionist painter August Macke, who had portrayed her more than 200 times. He died in World War I. Later, she lived in Berlin with her second husband, Lothar Erdmann, who died in a concentration camp during World War II. She saved Macke's paintings and copies of his letters by moving them from her house in Berlin before it was bombed in 1943.

== Life ==
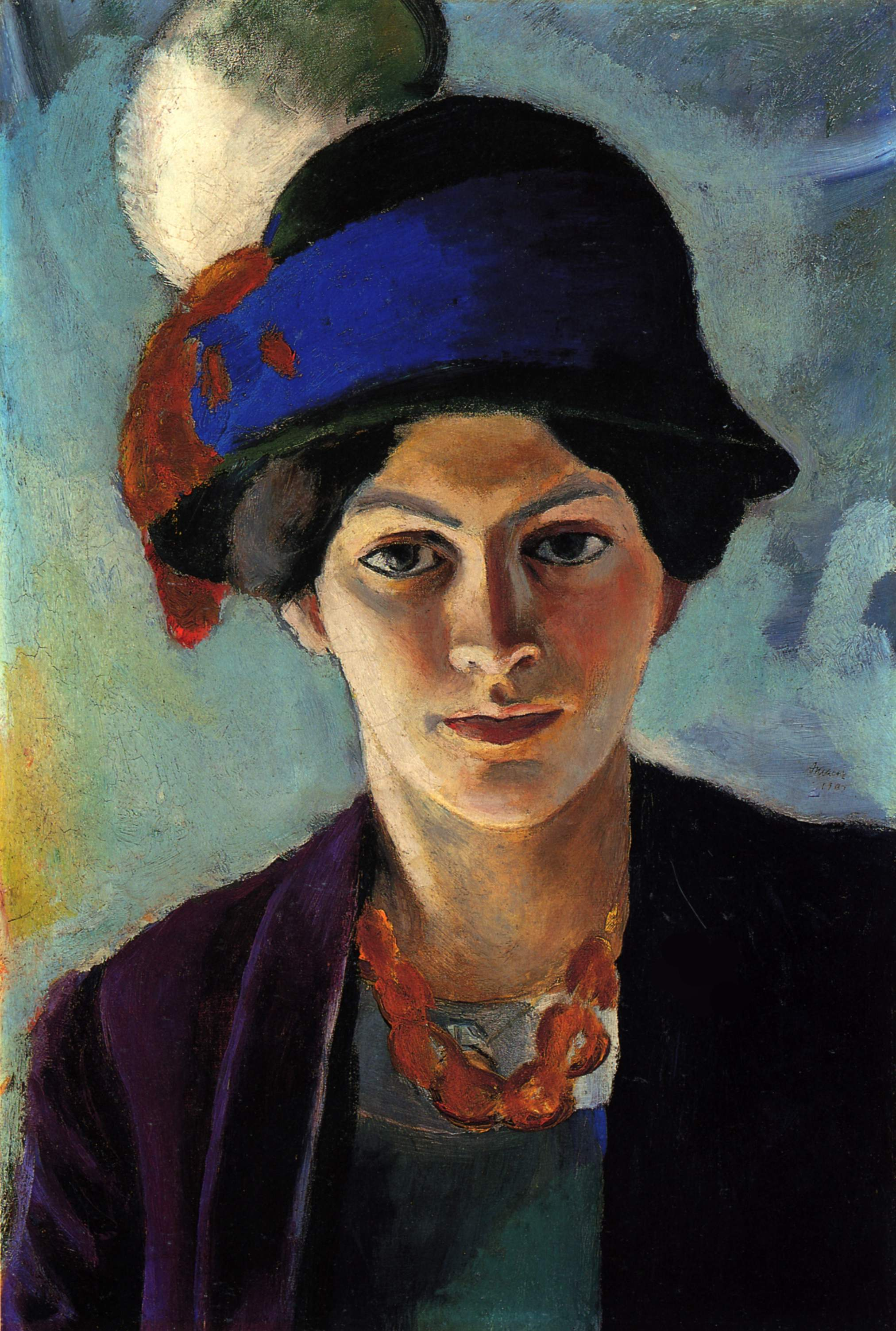
August Macke: Porträt der Frau des Künstlers mit Hut (1909)

Born in Bonn, Elisabeth Gerhardt, called Lisbeth, was the daughter of a family of merchants. Her father, Carl Gerhardt, owned a factory for pharmaceutical appliances. Her mother came from Erfurt. Her uncle was German industrialist and art collector Bernhard Koehler. Elisabeth met August Macke in 1903, when he was 16. They kept their relationship secret, but he often visited her parents' house under the pretence of painting her brother. When her father was seriously ill in 1905, she was sent for education to Bern. She learned French, English, Italian, music, home economics, and gardening.

On 5 October 1909, she married Macke. The couple had two sons, Walter and Wolfgang. The Mackes were friends with Franz Marc and his wife Maria whom they met at the Blauer Reiter group at the house of Gabriele Münter in Murnau.

On 1 August 1914, Macke was drafted into World War I and sent to the French Front. He died in battle on 26 September that year. Elisabeth received the information a month later. In 1915 she began to write about their love and marriage, episodes of family life, and travels and meetings with artists, mainly, as she put it, to "preserve an image of their father", or "ein Bild ihres Vaters zu bewahren", for her sons.

In 1916, she married Lothar Erdmann, a friend of her husband from school days, with whom she had three more children, Dietrich, Constanze and Klaus. The family moved to Berlin-Tempelhof in 1925. Her oldest son died in 1927 of scarlet fever. Her husband was arrested in 1939 under the Nazi regime and died in Sachsenhausen concentration camp.

Elisabeth saved Macke's paintings by moving them from the house in Berlin. Macke's original letters were almost completely lost when the house was bombed in 1943, but she had made copies of his letters, which were saved.

She returned to Bonn in 1948, where she lived in a small apartment in August Macke's atelier until 1976. Their home is now a museum, the August-Macke-Haus. She took part in the cultural life of the town and published her memoirs as a book in 1962.

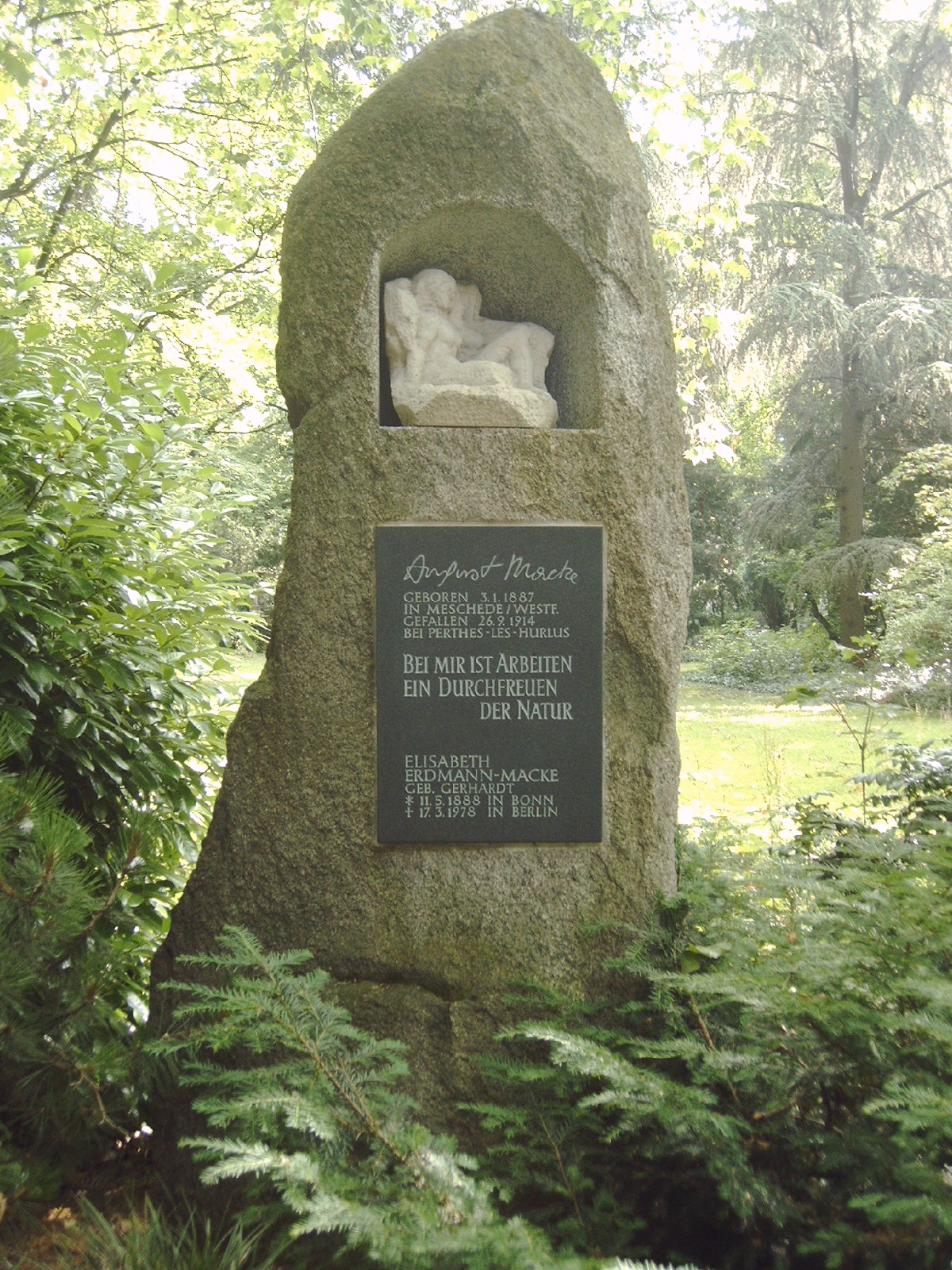
Memorial for August Macke and Elisabeth Erdmann-Macke in the Alter Friedhof, Bonn

Erdmann-Macke wrote memoirs in the 1970s of meetings with artists, including Robert and Sonia Delaunay, Lyonel Feininger, Paul Hindemith, Wassily Kandinsky, Paul and Lily Klee, the Marcs, Paul Magar, Herwarth Walden, and Mary Wigman. A collection based on 110 manuscripts, entitled Begegnungen (Encounters), was published in 2009.

Elisabeth spent her last two years with her children in Berlin, where she died in 1978 at the age of 89.

== Publications ==
- Erinnerung an August Macke (with an essay by Lothar Erdmann and 20 illustrations), Kohlhammer 1962; 16th edition, Fischer Taschenbuch, Frankfurt am Main 2006, ISBN 978-3-596-25660-0
- Begegnungen, edited and with a biographical overview by Margarethe Jochimsen and Hildegard Reinhardt, Kerber Verlag, Bielfeld 2009, ISBN 978-3-86678-292-1

== Sources ==
- Hildegard Möller: Lisbeth und August Macke, in: Malerinnen und Musen des "Blauen Reiters", Piper Verlag, München/Zürich 2012, ISBN 978-3-492-27492-0; pp. 228–278

== Catalogue ==
- "Mein zweites Ich": August und Elisabeth Macke, in Schriftenreihe August Macke Haus, Bonn 2009, ISBN 978-3-929607-58-1
