= Dietrich Erdmann =

German composer

Dietrich Erdmann (20 July 1917 – 22 April 2009) was a German composer and university lecturer.

== Life ==
Erdmann was born in Bonn. His father was the publicist and trade union official Lothar Erdmann, his mother Elisabeth Erdmann-Macke, the painter August Macke's widow. Erdmann had lived in Berlin since he was eight years old. His childhood was characterised by a family environment with a strong cultural interest.

He received his first piano lessons at the age of nine. Already during his school days at the Humanistisches Gymnasium In Berlin, he paid visits to the composers Paul Hindemith, Ernst-Lothar von Knorr and Harald Genzmer.

In 1931, he began his cello lessons with Pál Hermann. From 1934 to 1938, Erdmann studied choir conducting and musical composition with Kurt Thomas and conducting with Walter Gmeindl at the Universität der Künste Berlin. He completed his studies with the künstlerische Reifeprüfung in choral conducting and the private music teacher examination in musical composition.

Erdmann was co-founder of the Arbeitskreis für Neue Musik at the Berlin University of the Arts.

From 1947, Erdmann taught at the Pädagogische Hochschule Berlin, where he became head of the music seminar two years later. He then was appointed associate professor in 1954. Twelve years later, he became Ordinarius and in 1970 prorector of the college. He retired in 1982.

Erdmann was married to Gisela Cludius from 1940 to 1946, to Bianca Kuron from 1949 to 1958 and to Gertrud Schulz from 1959.

Erdmann died in Berlin at the age of 91.

== Activities ==
Erdmann's work encompasses a wide variety of instrumentations and almost all types of musical form: 16 concertos, 12 pieces for grand orchestras, piano music, and solo and chamber music for Strings and wind instruments, as well as lieder, cantatas and choir music. In addition, Erdmann composed numerous Zupfmusik (music for plucked instruments) works.

== Awards ==
- Order of Merit of the Federal Republic of Germany am Bande (15 January 1987).
- 1988: Johann-Wenzel-Stamitz-Preis.
- 1990: Honorary member of the Bund deutscher Zupfmusiker
- 1993: Honorary Chairman of the Deutscher Tonkünstlerverband Berlin
- 1998: Humboldt-Plaketten.
- 2002: Kulturpreis Schlesien des Landes Niedersachsen.

== Work ==
- 1946: Der Maien for soprano, choir, flute and string quartet
- 1956: Concertino for piano and small orchestra
- 1965: Sonata for oboe and piano
- 1971: Dialoghi for Violoncello and piano
- 1979: Mandolin Concerto
- 1982–1983: Prisma for viola and piano
- 1984: Resonanzen for Saxophone-Quartet
- 1986: Concertino for viola (or English horn or clarinet) and ensemble of plucked instruments
- 1990: Double Concerto for bassoon, contrabassoon and orchestra

== Recording ==
- Werke für Zupforchester. Mühlheimer Zupforchester (Ltg. Detlef Tewes). Telos music records, 2002
