= Bernhard Koehler =

German industrialist and art collector

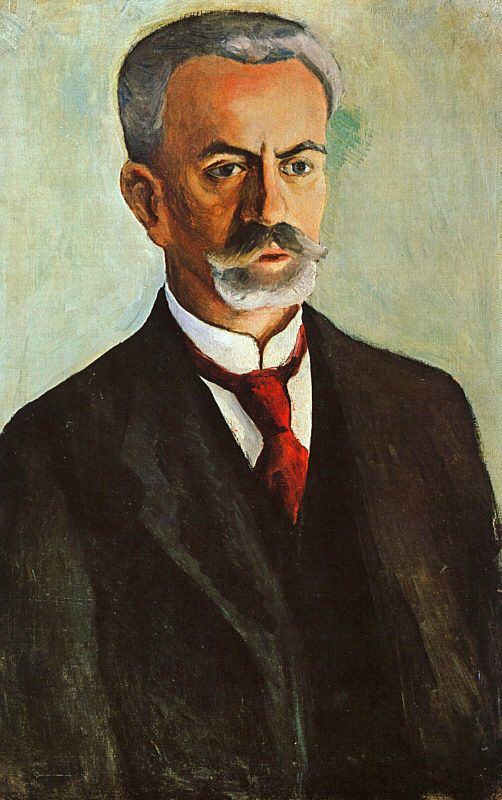
August Macke: Bildnis Bernhard Koehler, 1910

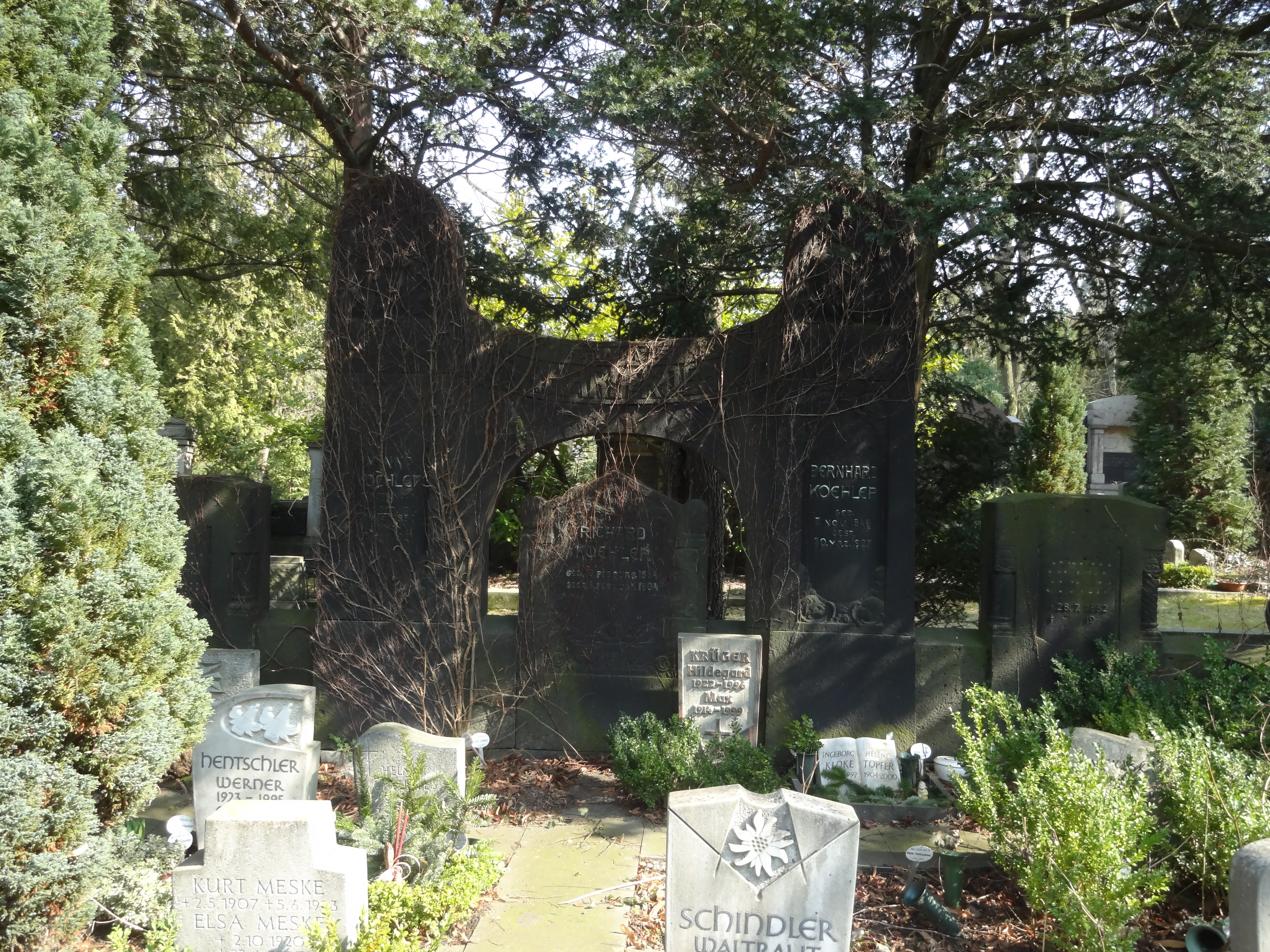
Headstone of Bernhard Koehler

Bernhard Koehler (born 7 November 1849 in Berlin; died 30 March 1927 in Berlin) was a German industrialist and art collector.

== Life ==
Koehler, who came from a family of merchants, grew up in Berlin. In 1876, Koehler founded the Mechanische Werkstätten (lit. 'Mechanical Workshops'). The company, located in Berlin-Kreuzberg, was internationally successful and allowed Koehler to amass a substantial fortune.

Beside his businesswork Koehler became an art collector. In the 1900s, Koehler came into contact with German painters in Munich such as August Macke or Franz Marc via his niece Elisabeth Gerhardt, who in 1909 eventually married Macke. He became a patron of Macke and gave him 300 Franc for a journey to Paris. Since 1910, Koehler also gave 200 Mark each month to Franz Marc, who was rather poor. In return for his financial aid he received several paintings from both Macke and Marc.

In 1911, Koehler came into contact with artists of Neue Künstlervereinigung München. He was a financier of the almanach by Der Blaue Reiter in Munich and in 1913 of the Erster Deutscher Herbstsalon in Berlin, which was organized by Herwarth Walden, August Macke and Franz Marc. In 1914, he gave financial help to Franz Marc for his journey to Tunis.

During his lifetime, Koehler's art collection was located in his family home in Berlin. In 1927, Koehler died and was buried in Berlin-Neukölln. His son Bernhard Koehler (1882–1964) became owner of the art collection. He sold some paintings at the end of the 1920s and some paintings got lost during World War II, as the factory and the family home got destroyed. Some of the more important paintings, however, were given to the Nationalgalerie during the war and came to Russia at the end of the War due to art theft. Some other paintings of Koehlers art collections are located in the Städtischen Galerie im Lenbachhaus in Munich today.

== Art collection from Bernhard Koehler ==
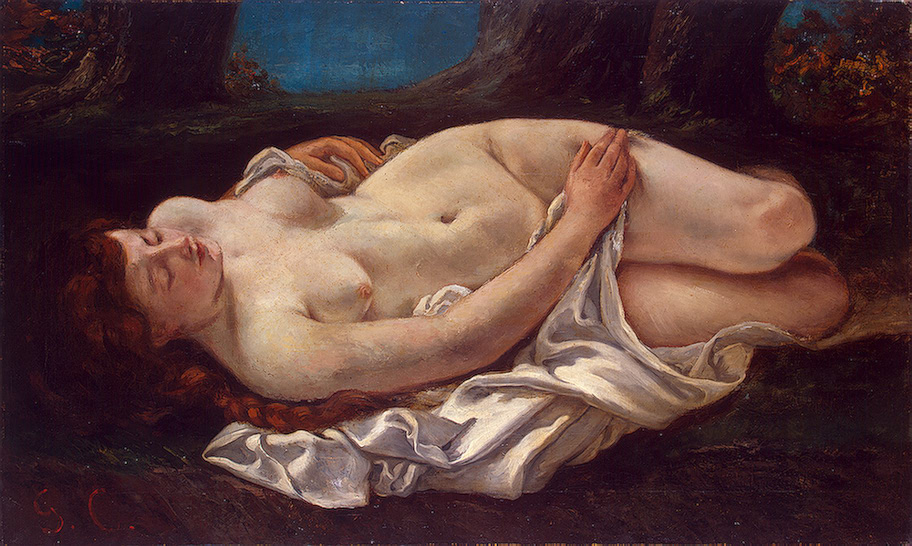
Gustave Courbet:
Femme couchée
today Eremitage,
St. Petersburg

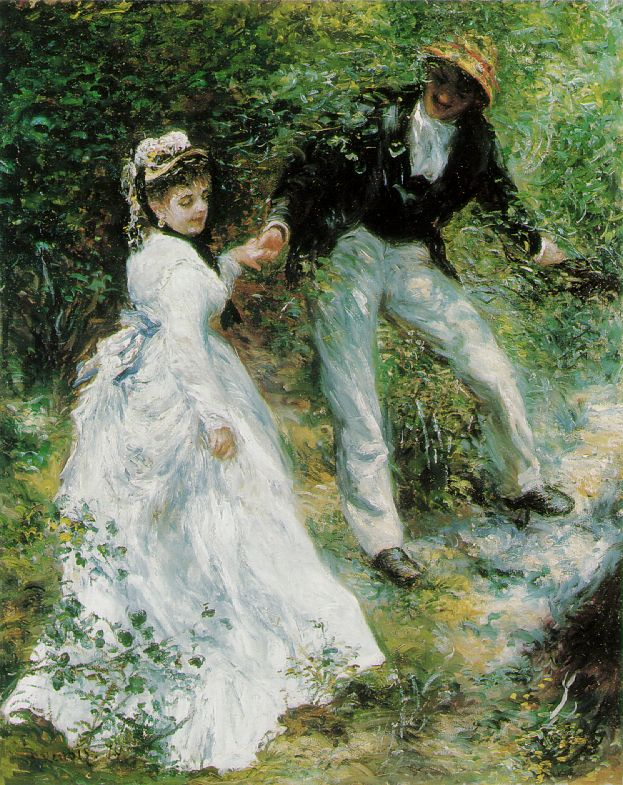
Pierre-Auguste Renoir:
La Promenade
today Getty Museum,
Los Angeles

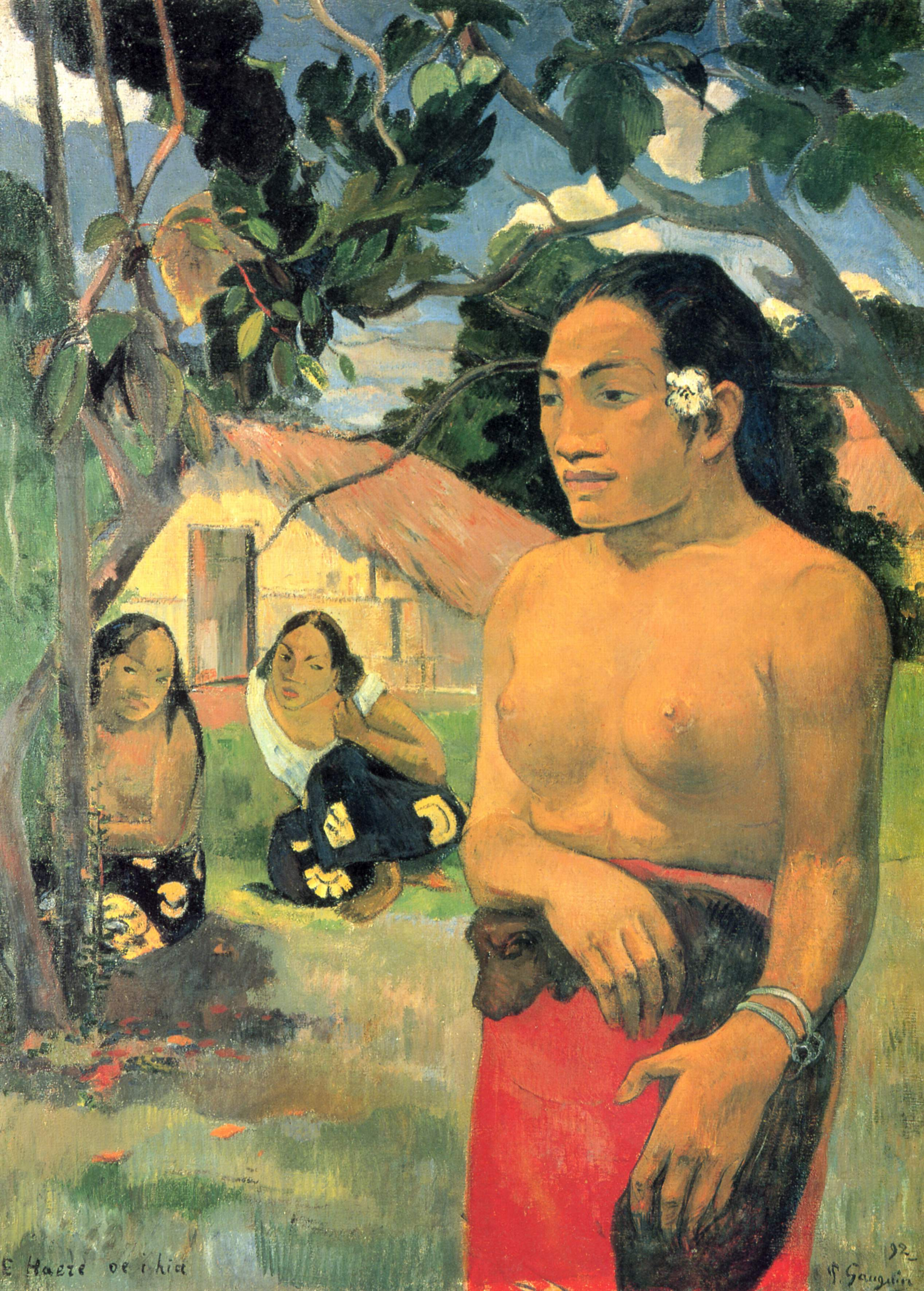
Paul Gauguin:
Wohin gehst Du?
today Staatsgalerie,
Stuttgart

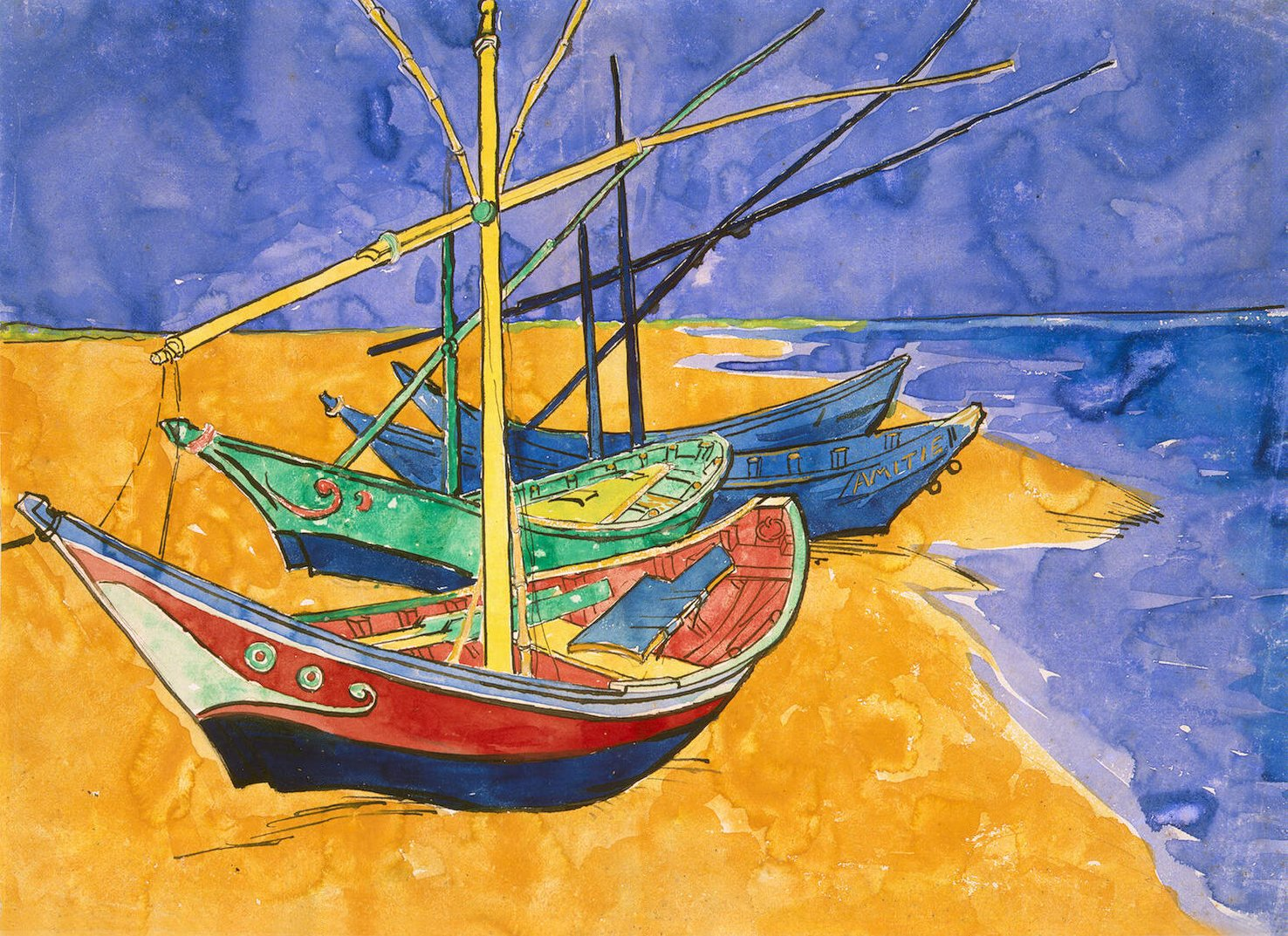
Vincent van Gogh: Fischerboote in Saintes-Marie
today Eremitage,
St. Petersburg

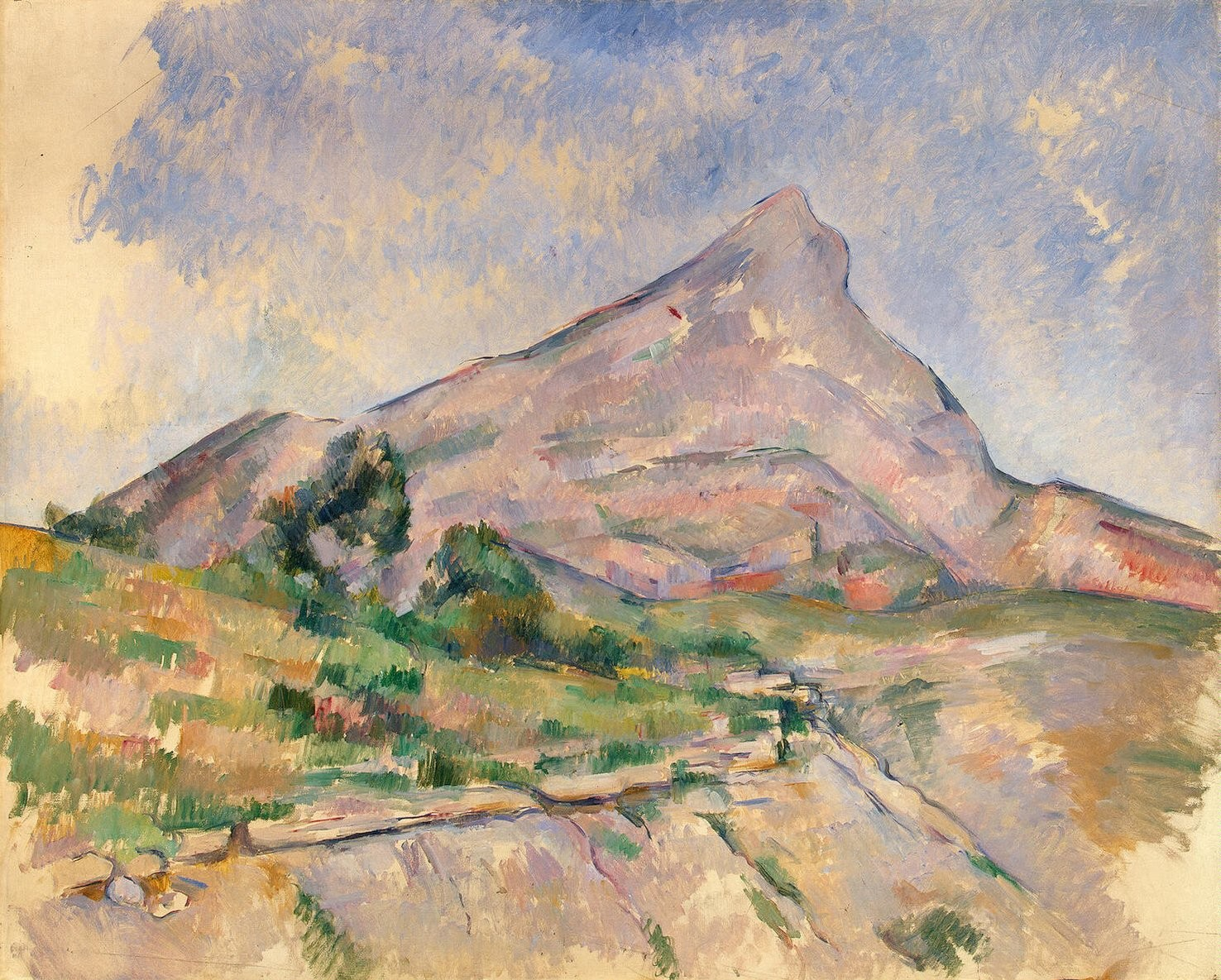
Paul Cézanne:
Mont Sainte-Victoire
today Eremitage,
St. Petersburg

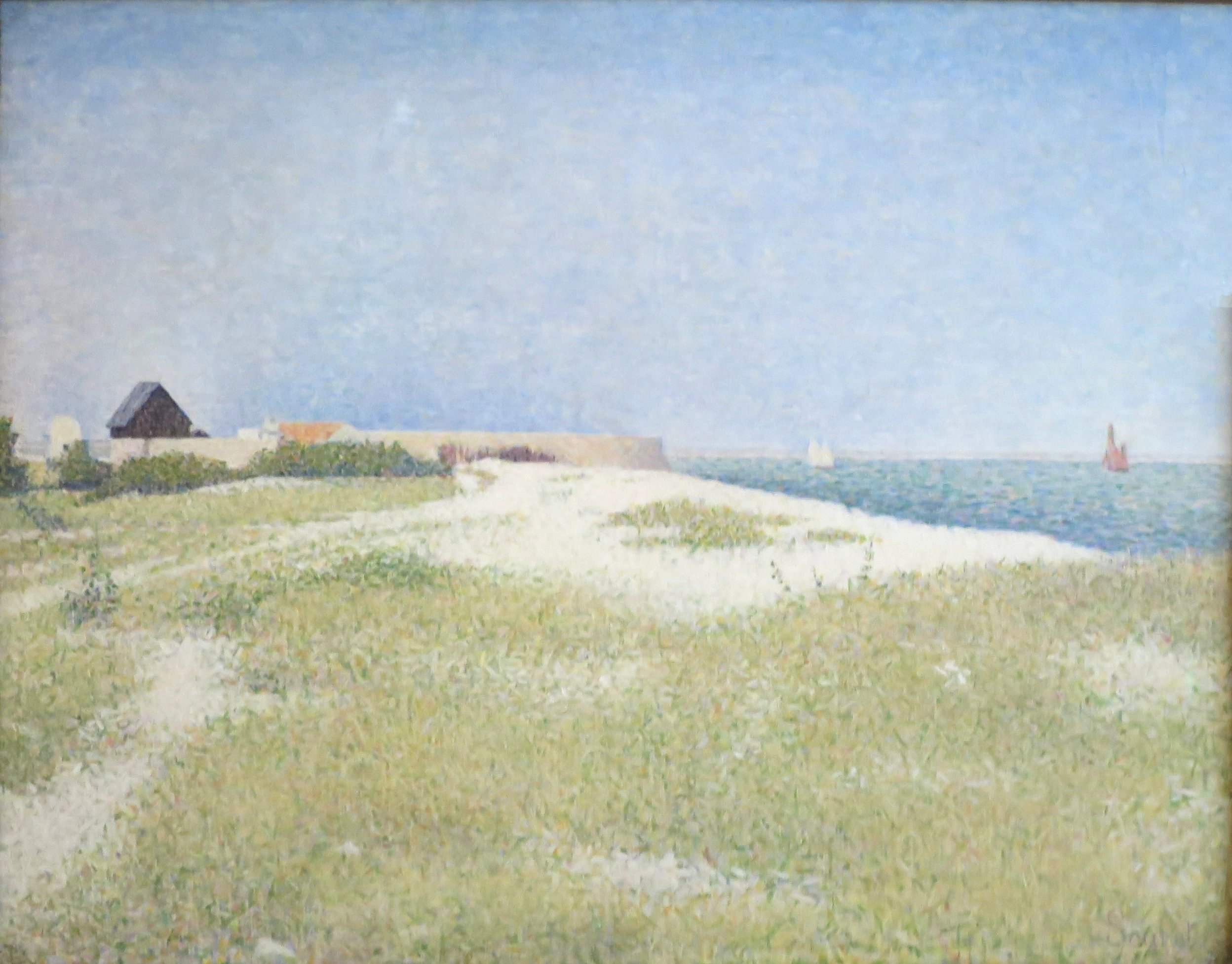
Georges Seurat:
Blick auf Fort Samson
today Eremitage,
St. Petersburg

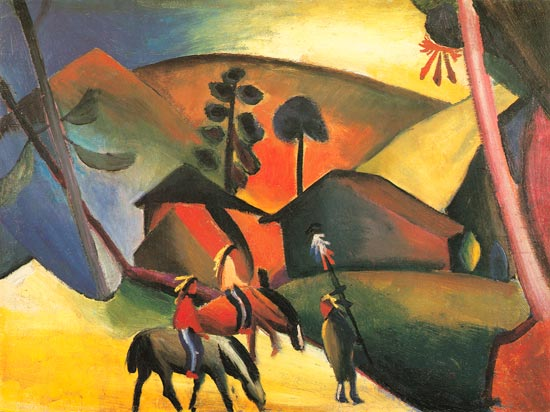
August Macke:
Indianer auf Pferden
today Lenbachhaus, Munich

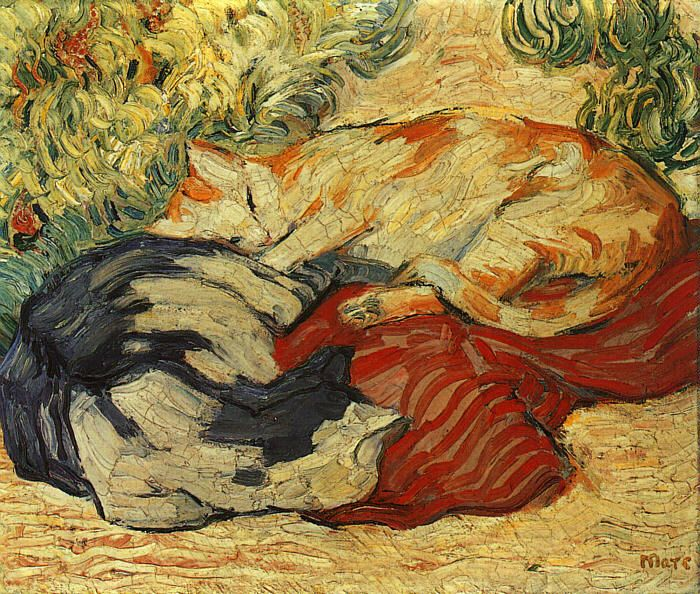
Franz Marc:
Katzen auf rotem Tuch, 1909/10, private collection

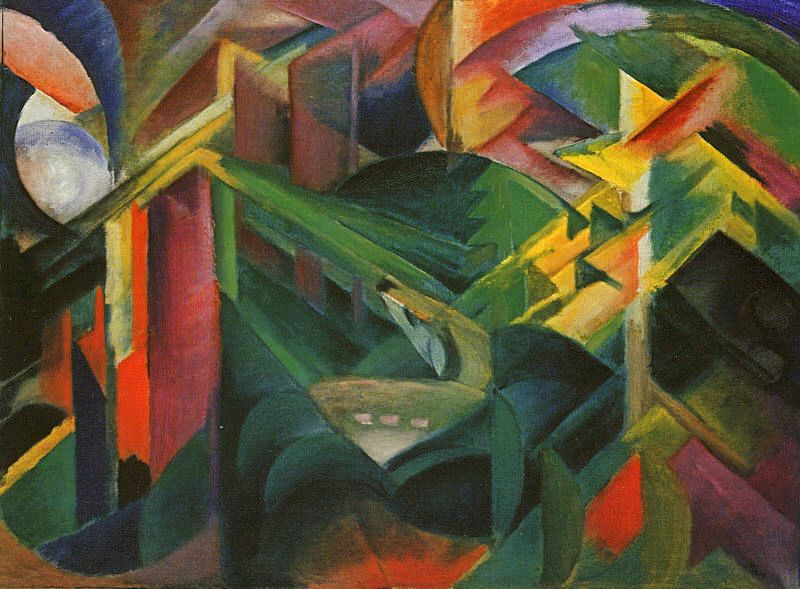
Franz Marc:
Franz Marc: Reh im Klostergarten, 1912,
today Lenbachhaus, Munich

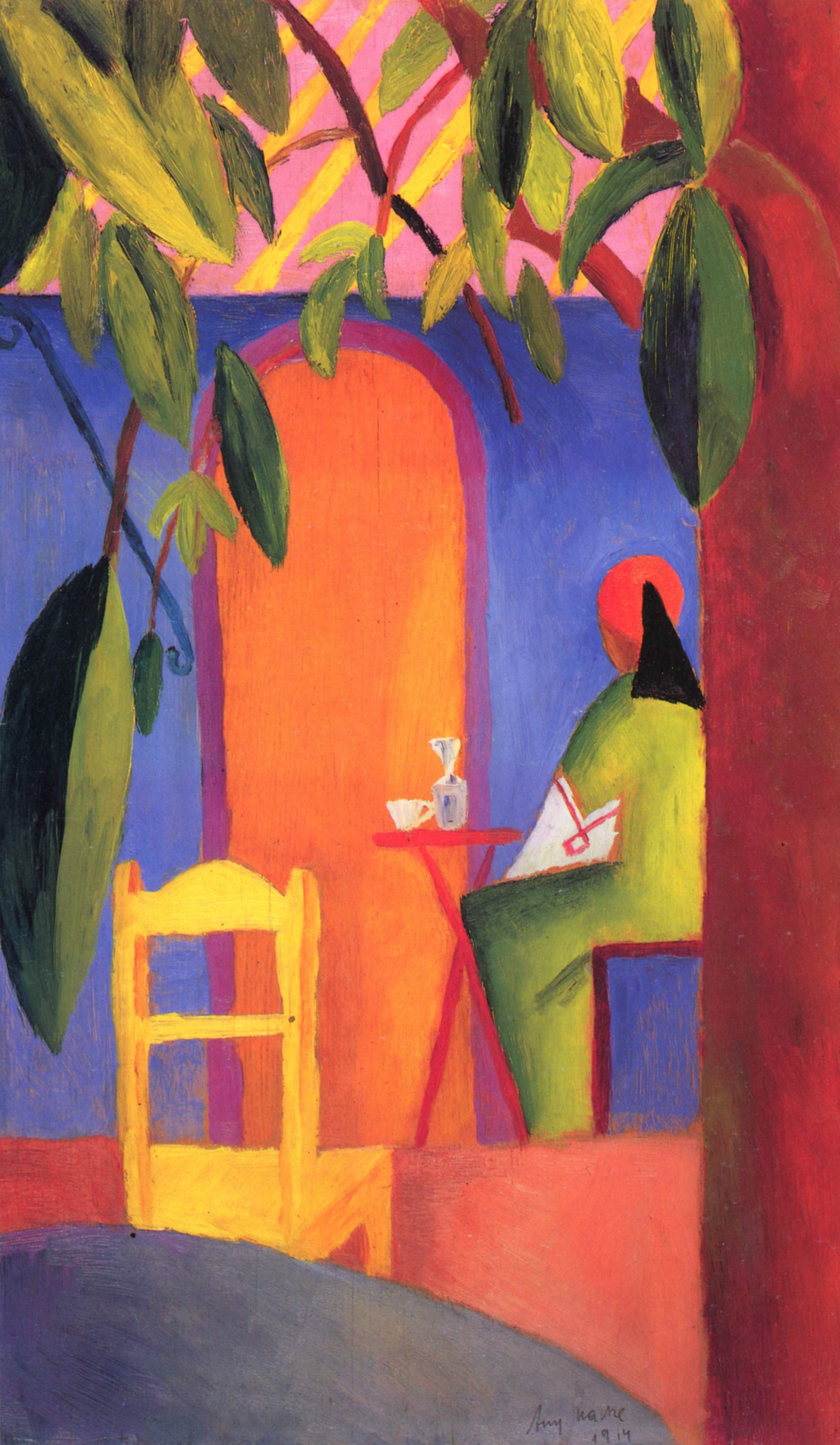
August Macke: Türkisches Café, 1914, today Städtische Galerie im Lenbachhaus, München

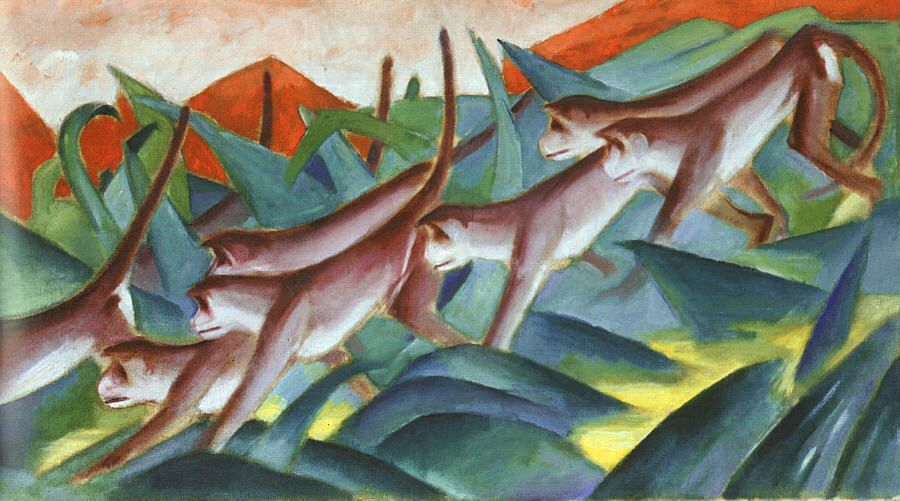
Franz Marc: Affenfries, 1911, today Kunsthalle Hamburg

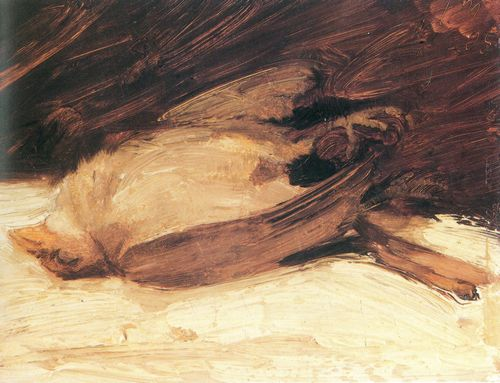
Franz Marc: Der tote Spatz, 1905

== Literature ==
- Berlinische Galerie: Stationen der Moderne Berlin 1988 ISBN 3-87584-256-1
- Albert Kostenewitsch: Aus der Eremitage, verschollene Meisterwerke deutscher Privatsammlungen Munich 1995 ISBN 3-463-40278-5
- Andrea Pophanken, Felix Billeter: Die Moderne und ihre Sammler Berlin 2001 ISBN 3-05-003546-3
