= Benno Erdmann =

German scholar (1851–1921)

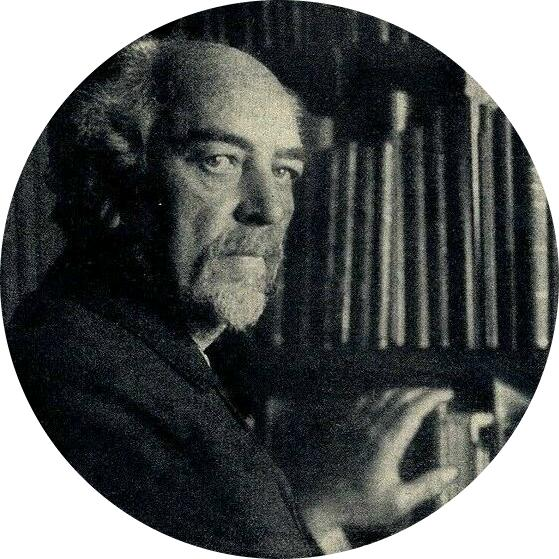
- Born: May 30, 1851; Guhren near Glogau, Province of Silesia, Kingdom of Prussia
- Died: January 7, 1921 (aged 69); Berlin, Germany
- Children: Lothar Erdmann

Education
- Education: University of Berlin
- Thesis: Die Stellung des Dinges an sich in Kants Aesthetik und Analytik (1873)
- Doctoral advisor: Eduard Zeller; Hermann Bonitz

Philosophical work
- Era: 19th-century philosophy
- Region: Western philosophy
- School: Neo-Kantianism
- Institutions: University of Kiel; University of Breslau; University of Bonn
- Doctoral students: Wolfgang Köhler; James Rowland Angell; Raymond Dodge
- Main interests: Logic, psychology
- Notable ideas: Logical laws as having mere hypothetical necessity

Benno Erdmann (German: [ˈeːɐ̯tman]; 30 May 1851 – 7 January 1921) was a German neo-Kantian philosopher, logician, psychologist and scholar of Immanuel Kant.

== Biography ==
Erdmann received his Ph.D. in 1873 from the University of Berlin with a dissertation on Kant. The title of his thesis was Die Stellung des Dinges an sich in Kants Aesthetik und Analytik (The Position of the Thing in Itself in Kant's Aesthetic and Analytic). Hermann von Helmholtz proposed Erdmann's publication Die Axiome der Geometrie (The Axioms of Geometry, 1877) as the basis for a habilitation.

In 1878 he became an extraordinary professor at the University of Berlin, in 1879 a full professor at the University of Kiel, and in 1884 he went to the University of Breslau, in 1890 to the University of Halle, in 1898 to the University of Bonn and in 1909 he returned to Berlin.

He was the father of journalist Lothar Erdmann.

== Works ==
- Martin Knutzen und seine Zeit. 1876
- Die Axiome der Geometrie, eine philosophische Untersuchung der Riemann-Helmholtz'schen Raumtheorie. 1877
- Kant's Kriticismus in der ersten und in der zweiten Auflage der Kritik der reinen Vernunft. 1878
- Logik. Bd. 1. Logische Elementarlehre. 1892 (review by Bernard Bosanquet in Mind (1892), N.S. No. 2)
- Abhandlungen zur Philosophie und ihrer Geschichte. 1893
- Psychologische Untersuchungen über das Lesen auf experimenteller Grundlage. 1898
- Die Psychologie des Kindes, und die Schule. 1901
- Historische Untersuchungen über Kants Prolegomena. 1904
- Über Inhalt und Geltung des Kausalgesetzes. 1905
- Umrisse zur Psychologie des Denkens. 1908
- Über den modernen Monismus. 1914
