= Raymond Dodge =

American experimental psychologist

- Born: February 20, 1871; Woburn, Massachusetts, United States
- Died: April 8, 1942 (aged 71); Tryon, North Carolina, United States
- Resting place: Mount Hope Cemetery, West Acton, Middlesex County, Massachusetts
- Education: Williams College; University of Halle
- Known for: Research on movements of the eye Tachistoscope
- Spouse: Henrietta Cutler (m. 1897)
- Parents: George Dodge (father); Anna (mother)
- Scientific career
- Fields: Psychology; Philosophy
- Workplaces: Wesleyan University
- Doctoral advisor: Benno Erdmann
- Doctoral students: Henry Foster Adams; Carleton Forman Scofield; Ernest Hilgard

Raymond Dodge (20 February 1871 – 8 April 1942) was an American experimental psychologist who studied the movements of the eye, developed an instrument known as the Tachistoscope to discover new eye movements and conduct experiments around reading. He began his education at Williams College and after receiving a degree in philosophy, Dodge decided to further his education at the University of Halle. Dodge became a philosophy professor for Ursinus College in 1896. In 1916, he was the 25th president of the American Psychological Association. He continued to conduct research and was active in professional associations until Parkinson's disease forced his retirement in 1936.

== Early life ==
Raymond Dodge, born in Woburn, Massachusetts in 1871. Dodge was the youngest of two sons to George and Anna Dodge. Raymond was the youngest of two sons to George and Anna Dodge. Growing up, Dodge was said to physically resemble his mother and resemble his father’s temperament and intellect. As a child, Dodge looked up to his father and grew interest in the same things as his father, including their shared interest in philosophy. Dodge and his father spent many hours at the library and his father’s store. With the help of his father, Dodge was introduced to topics of medicine, philosophy, physiology, and religion. It came to no surprise of his mother and father when Raymond Dodge decided he would study philosophy at Williams College in Williamstown, Massachusetts.

== Academic career ==
While attending Williams College, Dodge studied philosophy. During his time there he ran in to some financial problems which resulted in him finding a job at the college library. Even with limitations, Dodge was not set back from his peers. In 1893, Dodge graduated with a Bachelor of Arts in Philosophy and decided to further his education by getting his graduate degree. Raymond Dodge had the intentions of staying within the states and attending either Harvard or Columbia but was unfortunately rejected from both schools. He ultimately chose to further his education at the University of Halle in Germany. At the University of Halle, Dodge was introduced to Professor Benno Erdmann, who eventually became a huge asset to the beginning of Dodge’s successful career. Erdman expressed to Dodge and a few other classmates his interest in having a Tachistoscope to help with his research on reading and perception. With the help of other colleagues, Dodge built a Tachistoscope and began conducting research on the eye and experiments on reading. These studies lead Raymond Dodge to identifying five types of eye movement including saccadic and pursuit, convergence, reflex compensatory and the backswing. As well as creating the Tachistoscope, Dodge contributed to the world of psychology by becoming the editor for the Journal of Experimental Psychology (1916) and of the Journal of Comparative Psychology (1921). He also wrote many scientific monographs and papers on language, vision, eye movement, and dynamic psychology.

== Personal life ==
Dodge married Henrietta Cutler in August 1897. Dodge and his wife did not have any children. While teaching at Wesleyan, he and his wife opened their home to the boys attending Wesleyan.

== Death ==
Six years after Dodge's retirement, he died on April 8, 1942.
