= Henry Foster Adams =

American psychologist and writer

Henry Foster Adams (1882–1973) was an American psychologist and writer. He published several scientific articles and books on psychology and in particular the psychology of advertising, and advocated the use of empirical and statistical methods to understand people's responses to advertising.

A student of Raymond Dodge and a longtime professor at the University of Michigan, among Adams' works are Advertising and its Mental Laws (1916) and The Ways of the Mind: The Study and Use of Psychology (1925).

He also produced over 30 scientific articles that were published in Journal of Applied Psychology, Journal of Educational Psychology and Psychological Review.
