= Erster Deutscher Herbstsalon =

Art exhibition

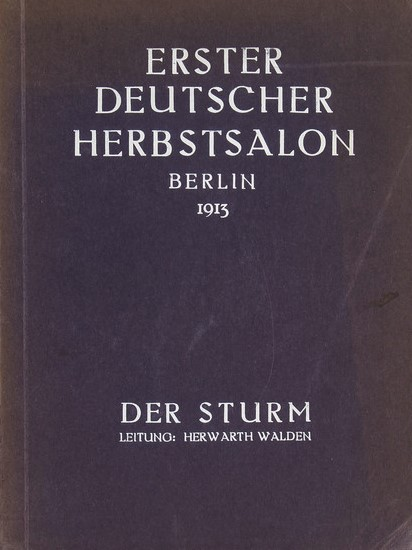
Exhibition catalogue

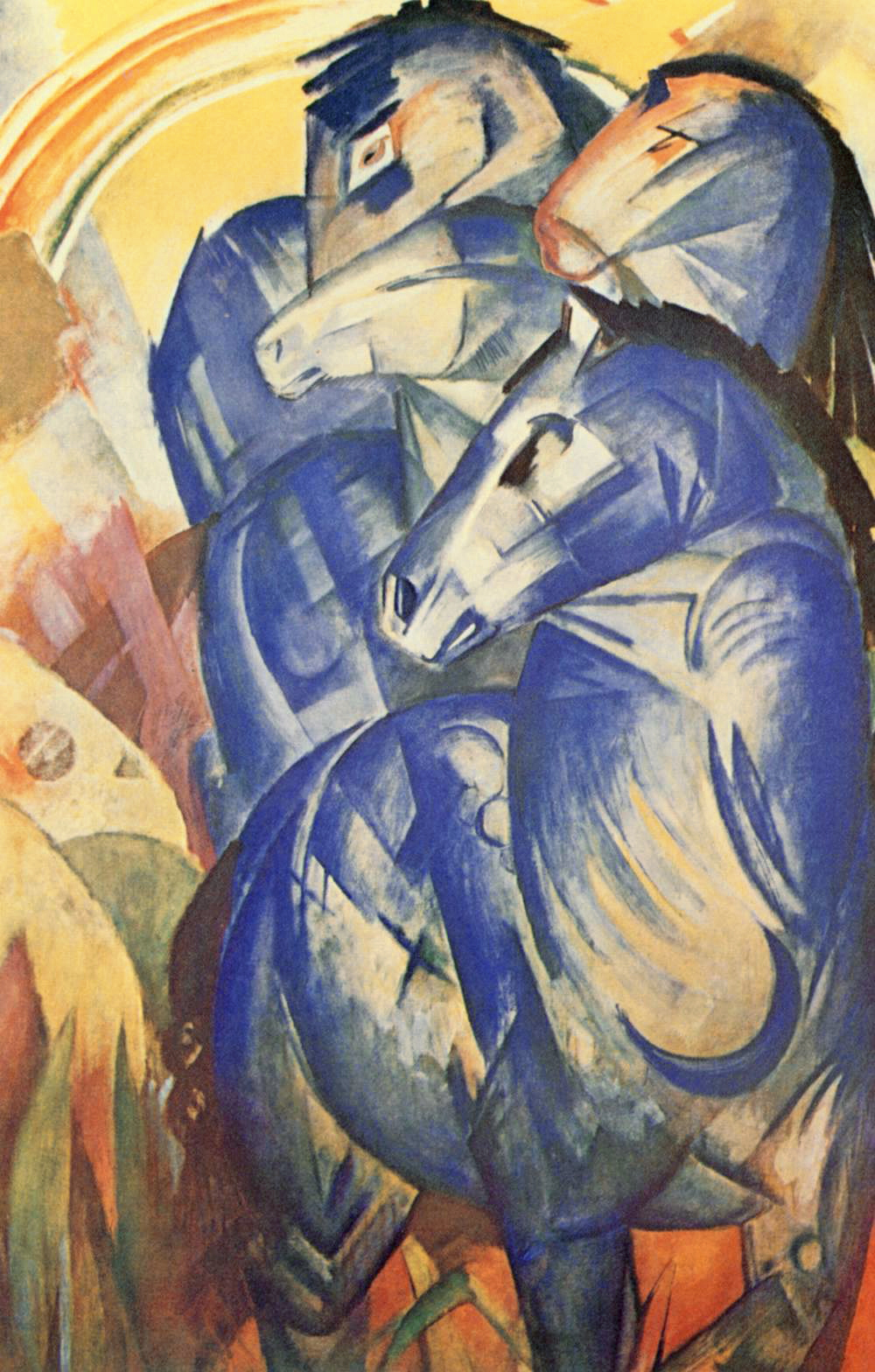
Franz Marc: The Tower of Blue Horses, 1913, Catalogue #272

Erster Deutscher Herbstsalon (First German Autumn Salon) was the title of an art exhibition that was organized in 1913 by Herwarth Walden in Berlin.

== Henri Rousseau memorial exhibition ==
The exhibition opened on 20 September 1913 in rented rooms ("Lepke-Räume") in the Potsdamer Straße 75, on the corner of the Pallasstraße on the third floor, on 1200 square metres, not far from Walden's gallery Der Sturm on der Potsdamer Straße 134a, and closed on 1 December 1913. The title of the exhibition refers to the Salon d'Automne held in Paris since 1903. The exhibition formed a contrast to the Sonderbundausstellung that had taken place in 1912 in Cologne and was dedicated to Impressionism, the more established modernism. There were artists in the autumn salon that had also exhibited there, but not come to the fore, like the painters of Der Blaue Reiter, as well as Carlo Mense and Alexander Archipenko. The latter had already exhibited in the salon in Paris. The (unnamed) sponsor Bernhard Koehler provided financial backing with 4000 marks, without which the exhibition would not have come about. August Macke and Franz Marc curated the exhibition. The painters of Der Blaue Reiter formed the main part of the exhibition. Marc himself exhibited his programmatic painting The Tower of Blue Horses.

In Germany, there were precursors in exhibitions of Die Brücke beginning in 1906 in Dresden and in the two exhibitions of Der Blaue Reiter in 1911 and 1912 in Munich, which were subsequently shown in various German cities. Walden took over the artists from the Futurism exhibition he had opened in his gallery, Der Sturm on April 12, 1912. In the aftermath of the Futurist exhibition and in the run-up to the autumn salon, the Prussian House of Representatives had debated art on April 12, 1913. One representative declared: "because, gentlemen, we are dealing here with a direction that means a degeneration, symptom of a sick time (lively cheers)." To be sure, the New York Times had also raised "suspicions of pathology" for the Armory Show, which brought modern painting to New York in the spring of 1913, at which Alfred Stieglitz had purchased Kandinsky's Improvisation No. 27 Improvisation 27 for $500.

Due to the outbreak of the First World War, the fall salon could not be continued in Berlin, so that no exhibition tradition was established under this name.

== Foreword ==
The exhibition catalogue had a preface by the gallerist Herwarth Walden and a foreword by the exhibitors, penned by Franz Marc.

Today, we do not live in a time when art is the helper of life. What real art is created today seems rather to be the precipitation of all the forces that life is not able to consume, to absorb; it is the equation that abstract-minded spirits draw from life, desireless, purposeless and without strife.

In other times, art is the yeast that leavened the dough of the world; such times are far away today. Until they are fulfilled, the artist must keep himself at an equal distance from official life.

This is the reason for our self-imposed seclusion from the proposals that the world makes to us; we do not want to mix with it. Among this "world" we also include the artists who are foreign to us, with whom it seems impossible for us to work together, not for 'art-political' reasons, of which there is so much talk today, but for purely artistic reasons.

The exhibitors

== Opening ==
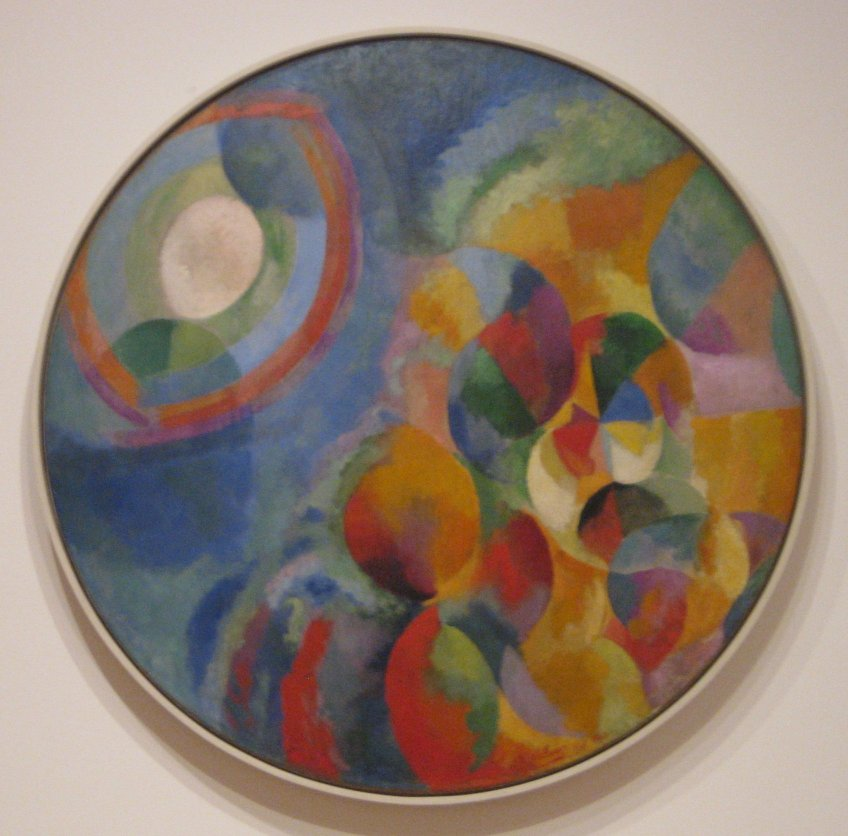
Robert Delaunay, Soleil Lune Simultané 1 catalogue #86

Hans Richter was present at the opening: "That was it! The Fauves! Picasso, Braque, the Futurists. Marinetti read from the Futurist Manifesto" This is how Richter thinks he remembers it, only: Picasso and Braques were, probably because of a their business relation to Paul Cassirer, not represented by Walden. Because of their connection to Cassirer or Flechtheim or the Sonderbund, Macke, Marc und Walden, who corresponded intensively about this, could not get the Brücke painters, nor Max Beckmann, Lovis Corinth, André Derain, Max Liebermann, Henri Matisse, Edvard Munch, Waldemar Rösler und Karl Schmidt-Rottluff, who they had been considering.

The First German Autumn Salon brought together exhibits of an international avant-garde, artists from America, Germany, the Netherlands, Austria, France, Italy, Russia and Switzerland. Walden wanted to provide an overview of the arts around the world. Among them, the Italian Futurists made a concentrated appearance with a total of fourteen works by Giacomo Balla, Umberto Boccioni, Carlo Carrà, Luigi Russolo, Gino Severini and Ardengo Soffici. Fernand Léger had fifteen works. Of the artists associated with Der Blaue Reiter, Paul Klee was represented with 22 watercolors and drawings, Wassily Kandinsky with seven paintings, Marianne von Werefkin with three, Alexej von Jawlensky with four, Alfred Kubin with 19, Gabriele Münter with six works. Robert Delaunay and his wife Sonia Delaunay-Terk had painted a series of oil paintings of sunlight and moonlight in the summer of 1913 in Louveciennes, which made up a large part of his 21 works here, with which Orphism also influenced Macke and Marc, while Sonja also had book covers, lamps and textiles among her 26 objects, in addition to these paintings. Marc was able to lure Lyonel Feininger out of his self-imposed "obscurity"; Kubin had arranged the contact.

Adolf Behne made the first guided exhibition tour for the visitors.

== Henri Rousseau memorial exhibition ==
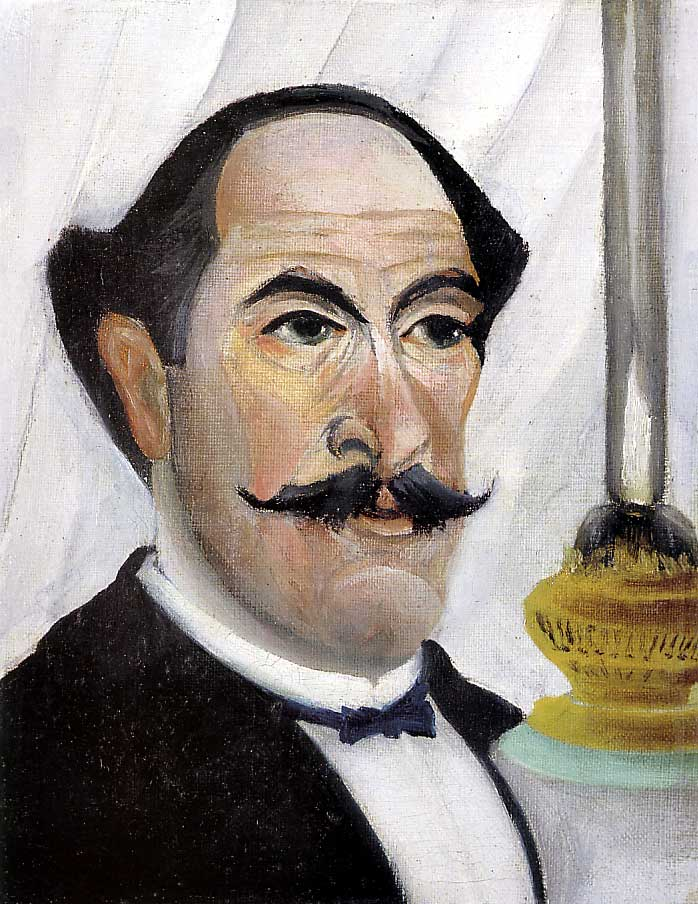
Henri Rousseau, Self portrait, 1903, from the collection of Delaunay, catalogue #3

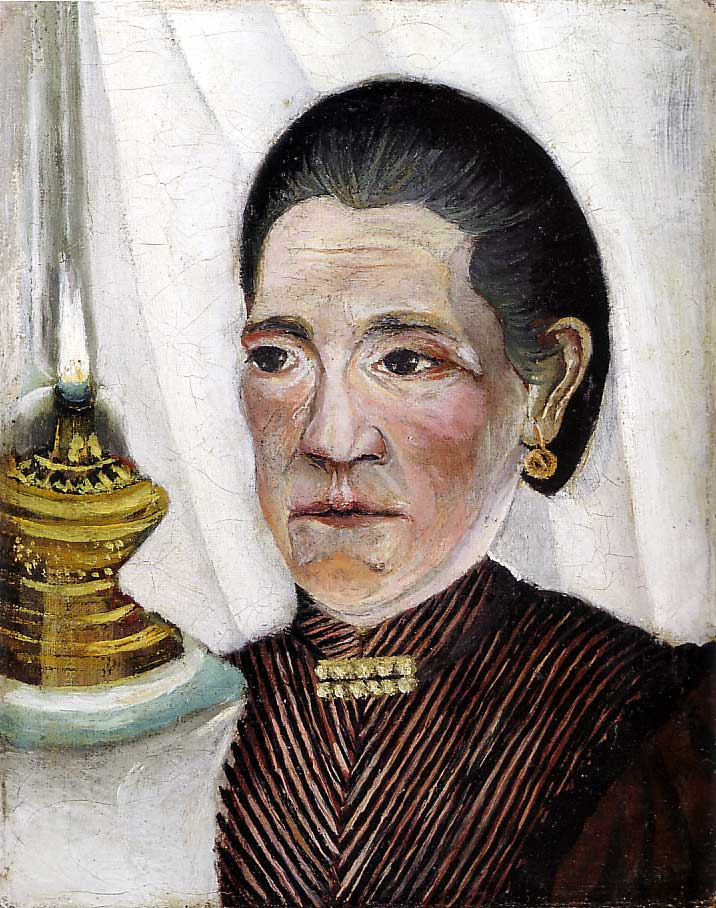
Henri Rousseau, Portrait de la seconde femme de Rousseau, 1903, from the collection of Delaunay, catalogue #21

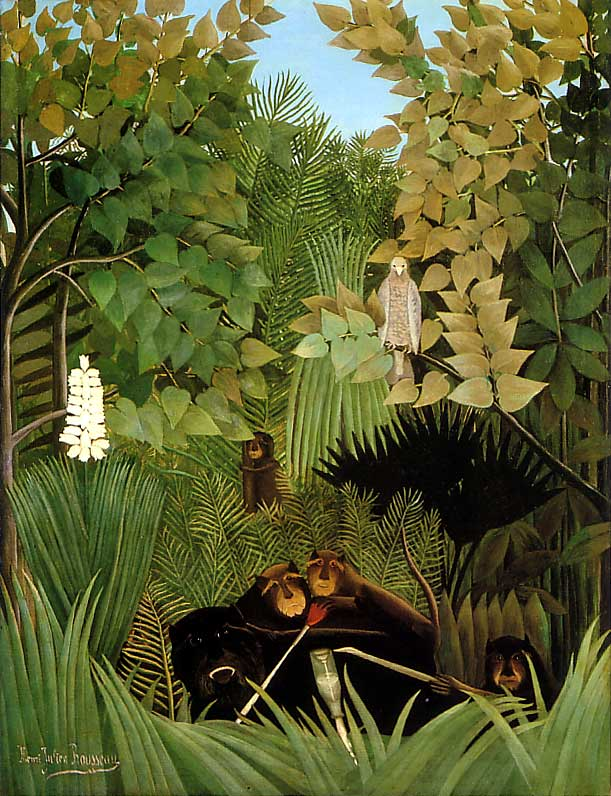
Henri Rousseau, The Merry Jesters, 1906, from the collection of Delaunay, catalogue #1

A special attraction of the exhibition was the memorial exhibition for Henri Rousseau, with 21 works and a pen and ink drawing–only the drawing was for sale–in memory of the painter who died in 1910. These paintings came mainly from Wilhelm Uhde and from the collection of Robert Delaunay, who was something like the executor of Rousseau's estate. From Delaunay came twelve works, including the two portraits. For Paul Westheim in the Frankfurter Zeitung, this was the part of the exhibition "that could be enjoyed without footnotes.".

== Polemic ==
When the First German Autumn Salon opened its doors in September 1913, it was met with a hail of vicious criticism. There was talk in the press that "the talentless were lined up here". Robert Breuer, in Vorwärts described the artists as "Hottentots in dress shirts, a horde of color-spraying howler monkeys. Herwarth Walden had to put up with being called an "incompetent academic, pretentious theoretician, colorful-skinned dolt and bastard talent." "In the new futurist-cubist-psychopathic-neopathological Berlin Autumn Salon", for the critic Emanuel of Simplicissimus there was not just "a Futurist portrait, whose main attraction was a glued-on mustache made from real hair", "made of futurist brushes", (this was the portrait of Gino Severini by Marinettti), but also the "Excrement of a mad cow" by Signor l'Asino, that was to be approached with the means of the excremental psychology. Karl Scheffler, apostrophized by Ludwig Justi as the "Pope of Art", also opposed Severini's hair collages. Walden countered with pointed remarks in his foreword for the catalogue with an Encyclopedia of German Art Criticism. Compiled from newspaper reports on the Autumn Salon, that he distributed as a pamphlet: He quoted from "boring the audience" through "negroes in tails" and "Malbotokuden" up to "art gallery of a madhouse", and ended with "and so on".

== Exhibition catalogue ==
The catalogue listed altogether 90 artists, painters, sculptors and architects with 366 images, designs and sculptures. The catalogue contained only 50 reproductions of exhibited works, however.

[the catalog] gives no impression at all and is weak in many respects; a number of pictures that were reproduced in it were not hung by us at all. Walden compiled it in advance according to the photographs sent in; the exhibition itself was basically something completely different. In any case, these boring photographs!

— Franz Marc to Alfred Kubin, 27 September 1913,

=== Represented artists with images ===
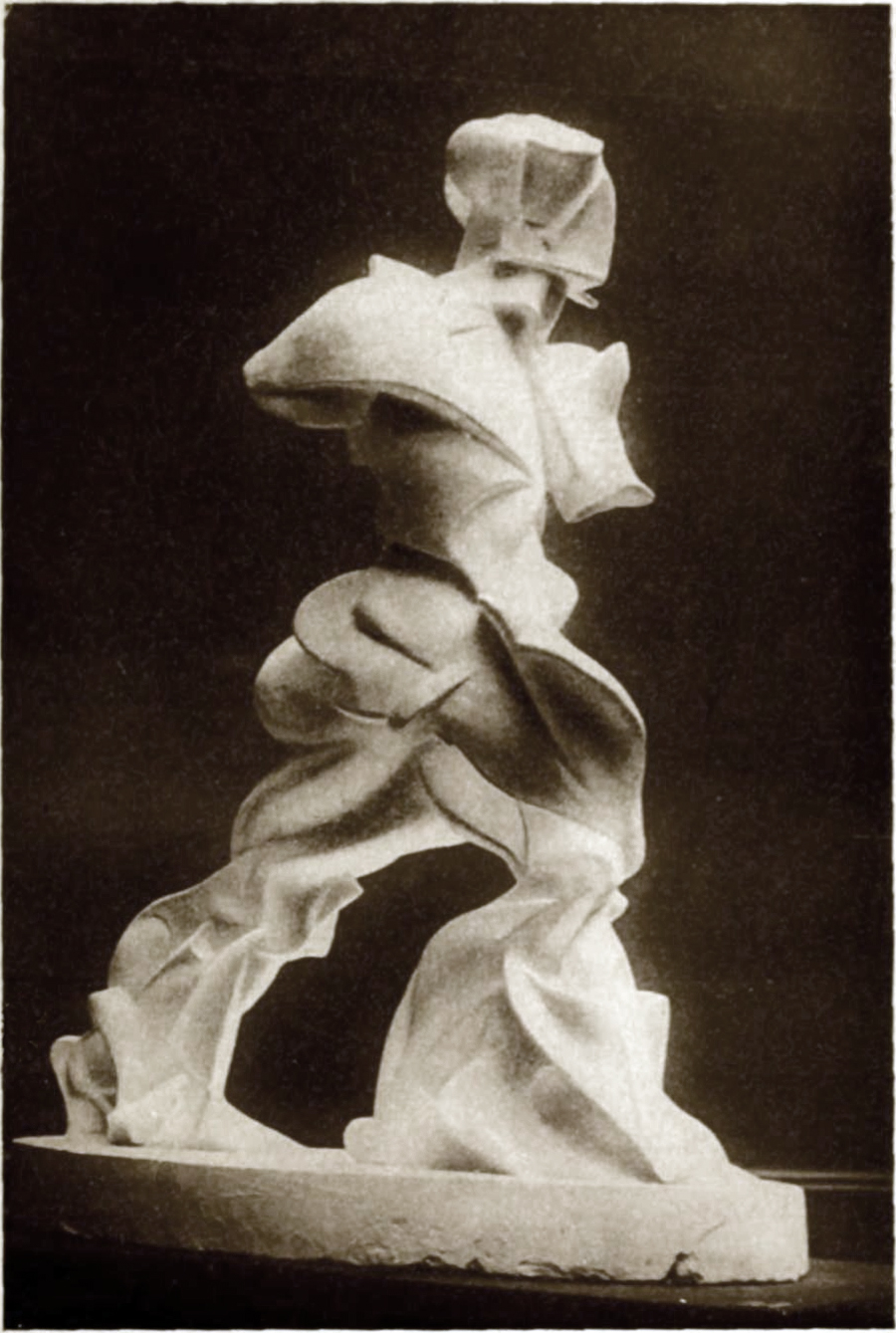
in the catalogue: Umberto Boccioni, Spiral Expansion of Muscles in Action.

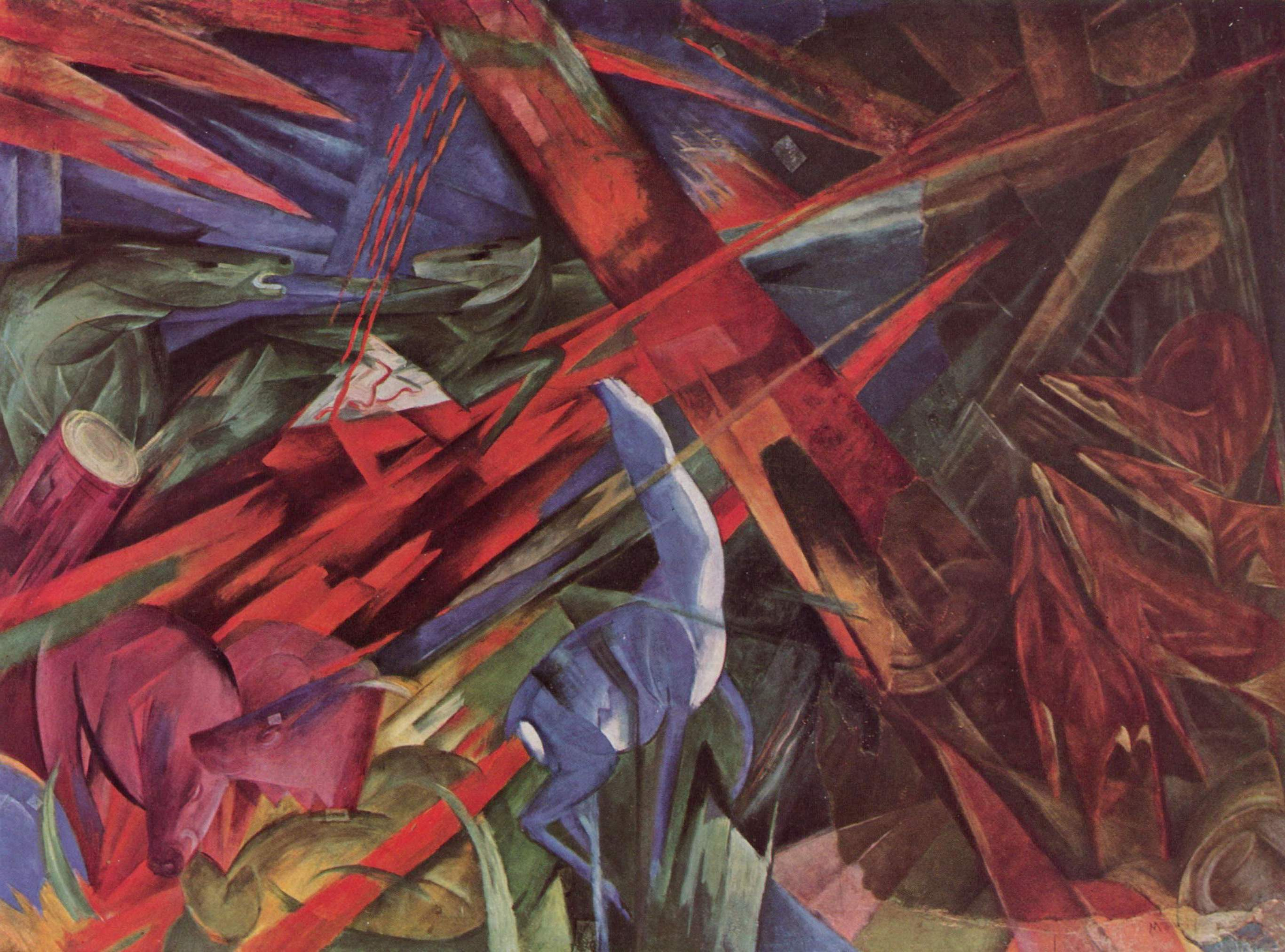
in the catalogue in black-and-white: Franz Marc: Fate of the animals, 1913, catalogue #271

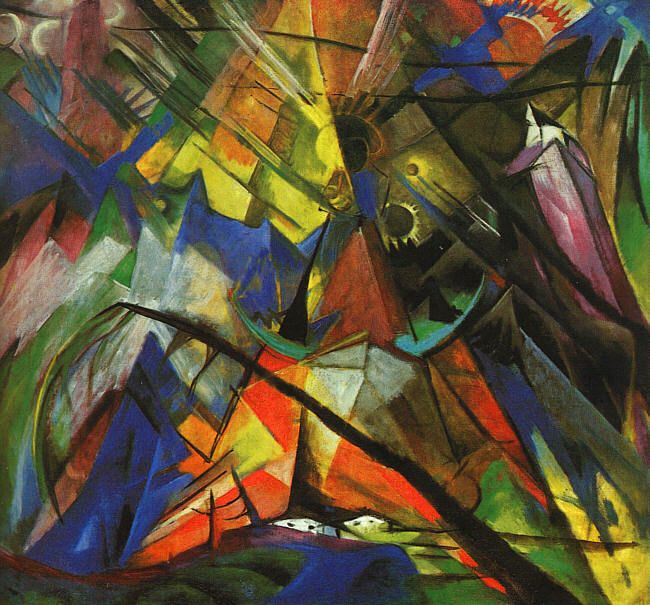
Franz Marc: Tirol, catalogue #274 (reworked after the exhibition

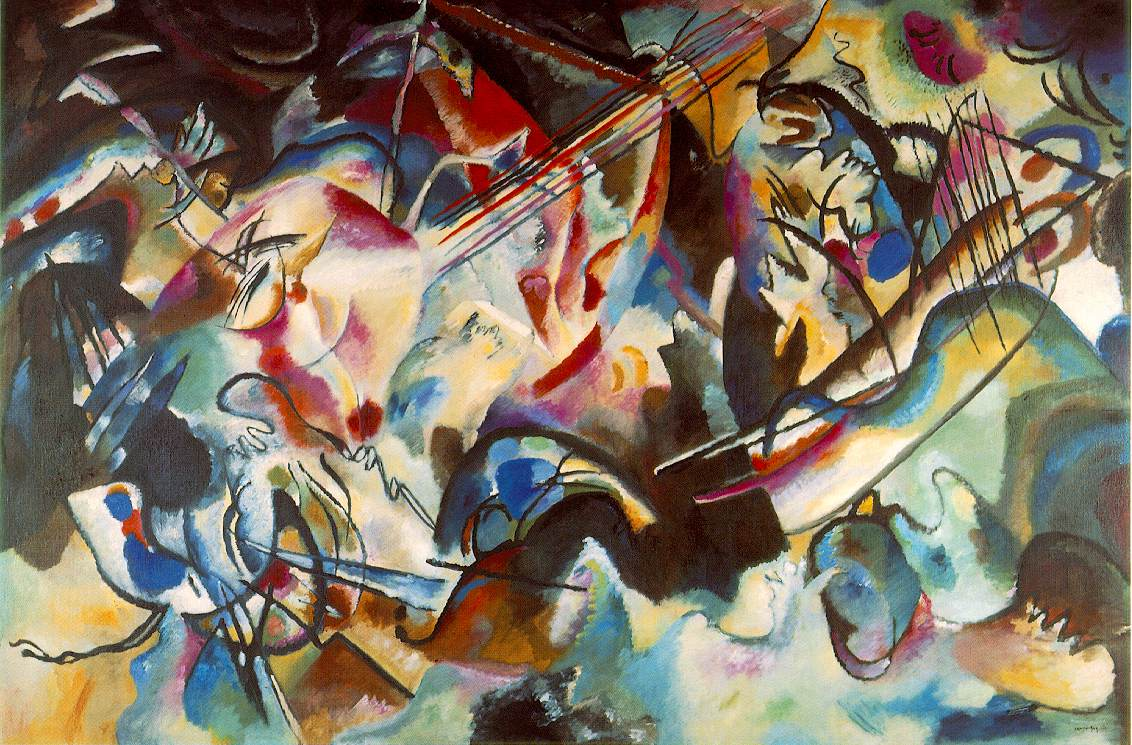
reproduced in black-and-white: Wassily Kandinsky, Komposition 6, 1913, catalogue #181

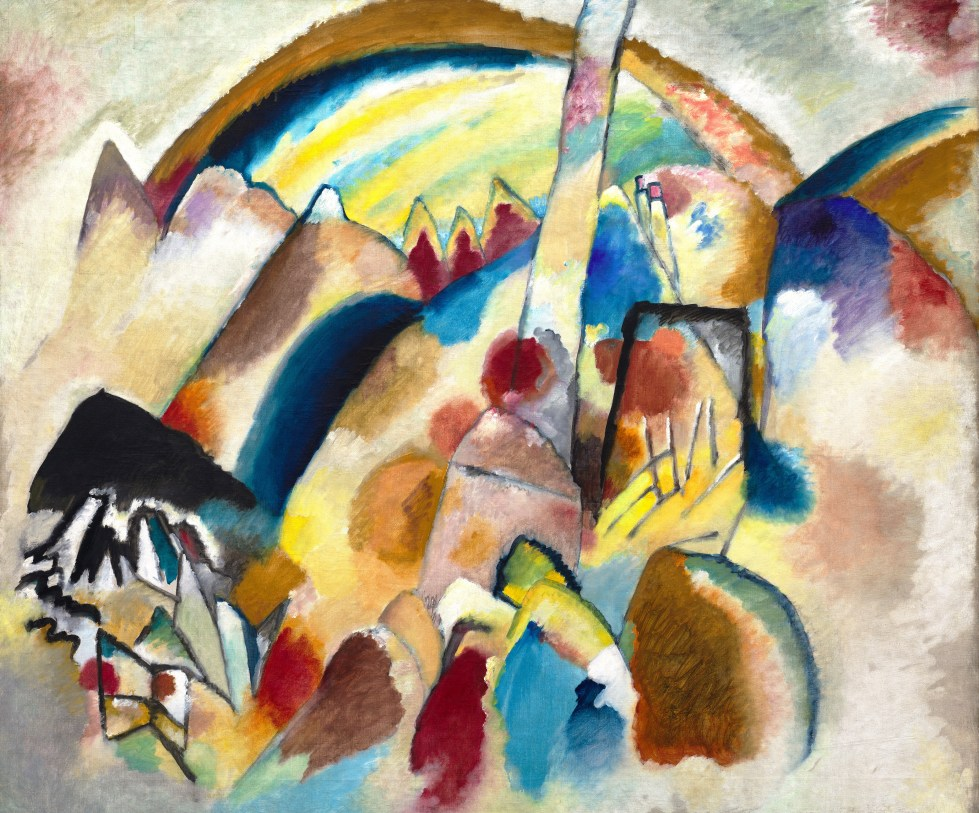
Wassily Kandinsky, Landscape with red spots, 1913, catalogue #184

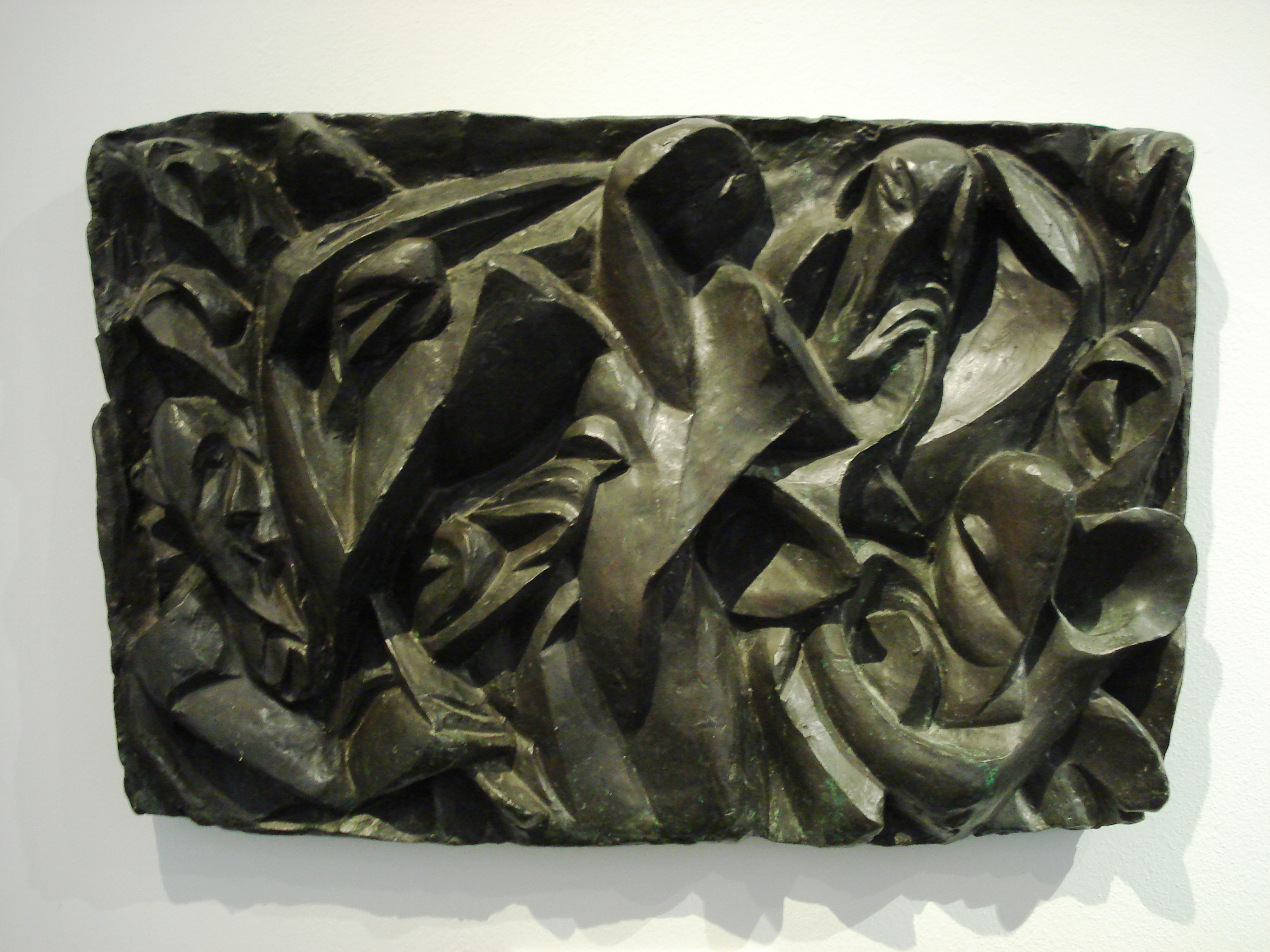
Otto Gutfreund, The Concert, plaster relief, 1912–1913, Ausstellungskatalog #152

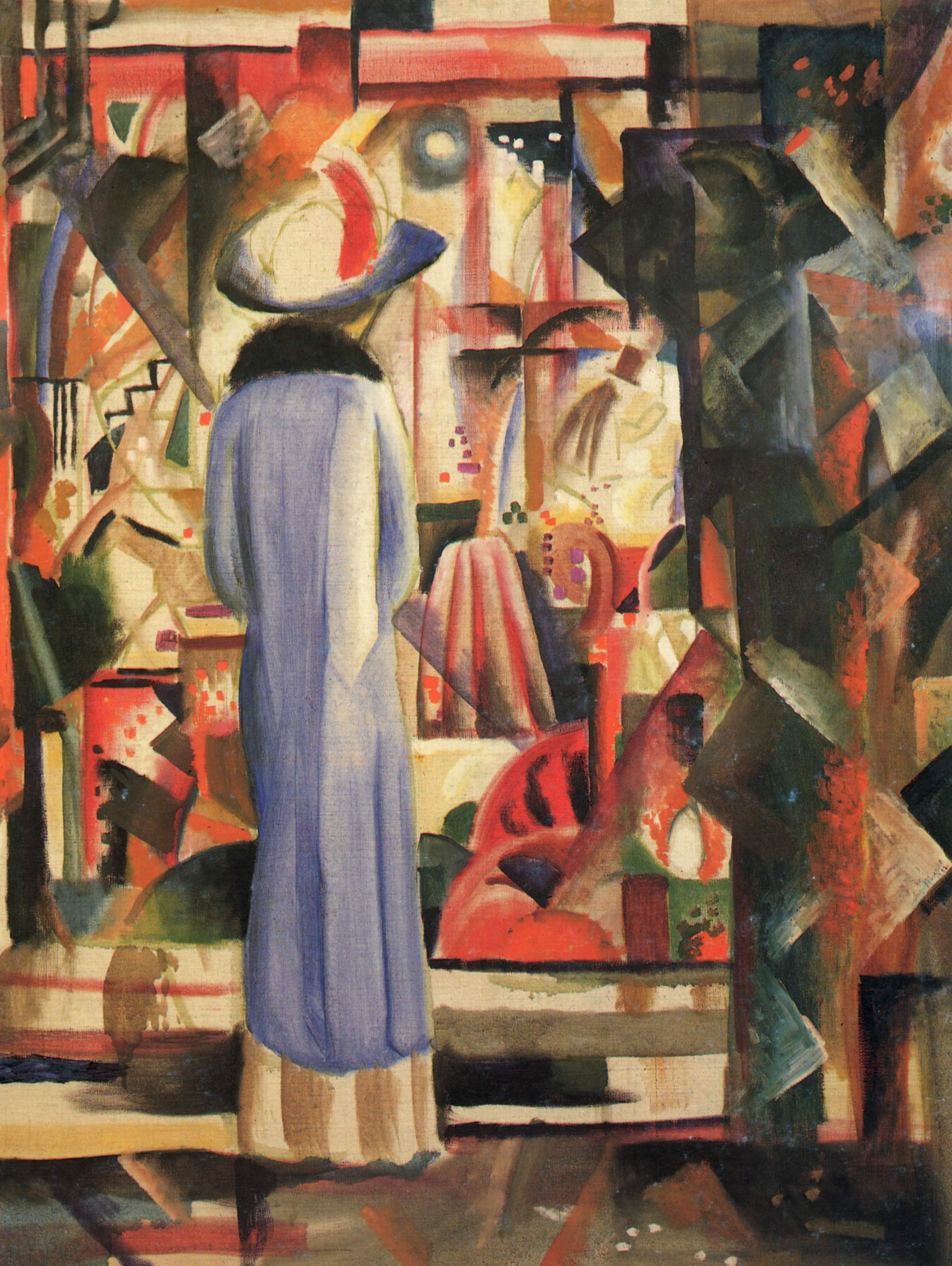
August Macke: Large bright shop window, 1912, catalogue #265

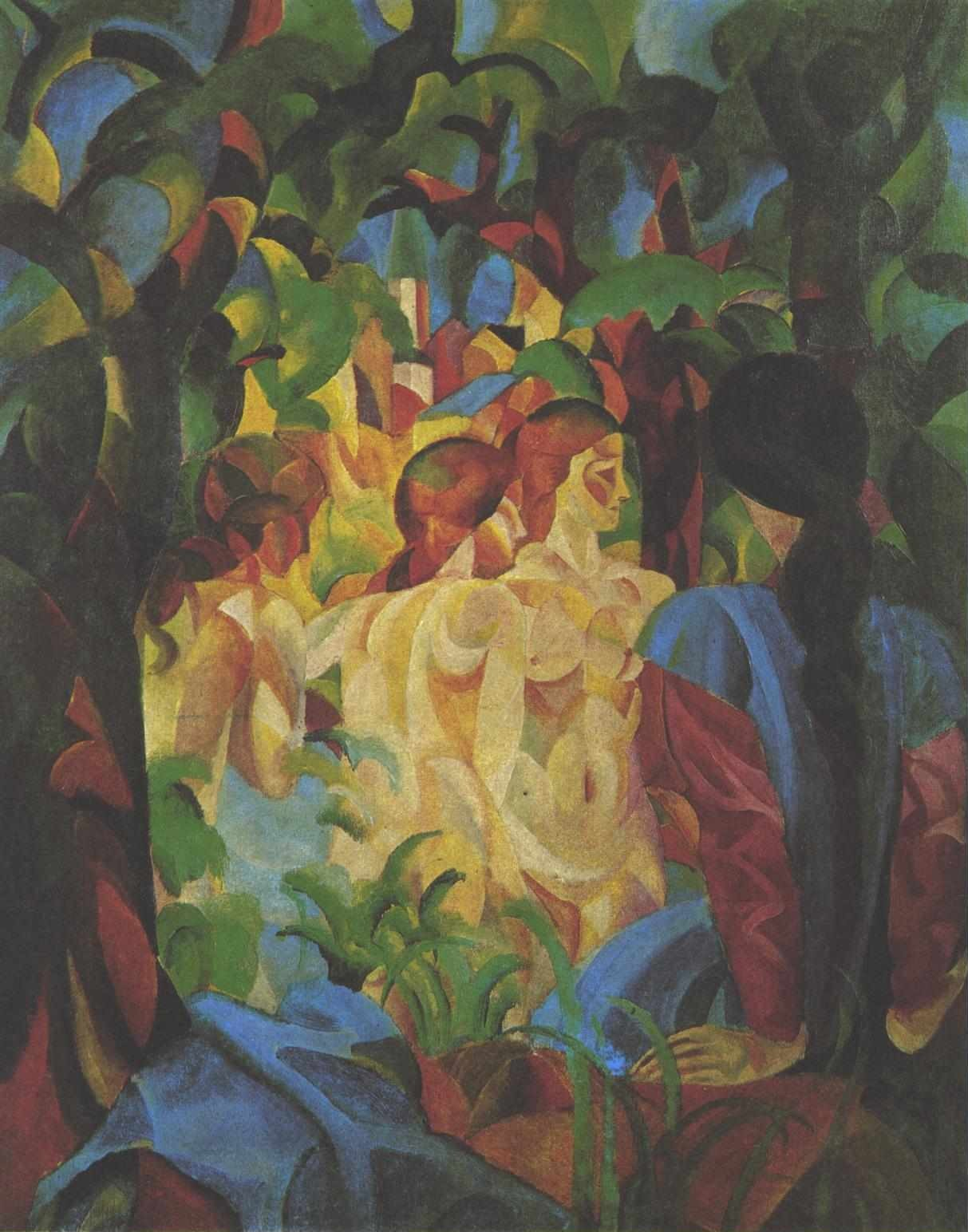
August Macke: Bathing girls with city in background, 1913, catalogue #262

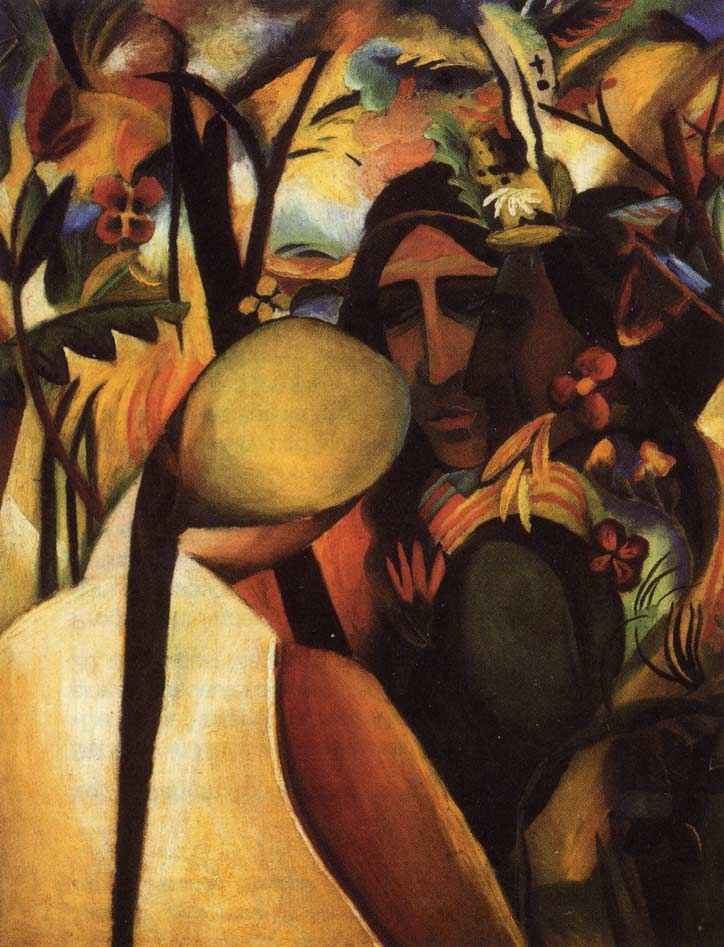
Not for sale: August Macke: Indians, 1911, catalogue #267

- Hans Arp
- Giacomo Balla
- Willi Baumeister
- Vincenc Beneš
- Albert Bloch
- Umberto Boccioni
- Hanns Bolz
- Patrick Henry Bruce
- Heinrich Campendonk
- Carlo D. Carra
- Marc Chagall
- Robert Delaunay
- Elisabeth Iwanowna Epstein
- Max Ernst
- Lyonel Feininger
- Emil Filla
- Ugo Giannattasio
- Natalie Gontscharoff
- Otto Gutfreund
- Walter Helbig
- Hermann Huber
- Alexej von Jawlensky
- Wassily Kandinsky
- Paul Klee
- Alfred Kubin
- Nikolai Iwanowitsch Kulbin
- Reinhold Kündig
- Michael Larionoff
- Fernand Léger
- August Macke
- Franz Marc
- Carl Mense
- Gabriele Münter
- Francis Picabia
- Albert A. Plasschaert
- A. Prochazka
- Adriana van Rees-Dutilh
- Otto van Rees
- Luigi Russolo
- Ludwig Schelfhout
- Paul Adolf Seehaus
- Richard Seewald
- Gino Severini
- Jan Sluyters
- Ardengo Soffici
- Amadeo de Souza-Cardoso
- Stanislas Stückgold
- Hans Thuar
- Marianne von Werefkin

=== Additionally exhibited artists listed in the catalogue ===
- Egon Adler
- Alexander Archipenko
- Fritz Baumann
- Wladimir Georgijewitsch Bechtejew
- David Burljuk
- Wladimir Burljuk
- Gordon M. Mac Couch
- Sonia Delaunay-Terk
- Heinrich Ehmsen
- Léo Gestel
- Albert Gleizes
- Gocar
- Marsden Hartley
- Jacoba van Heemskerck
- Franz Henseler
- George Jacouloff
- Pavel Janák
- Oskar Kokoschka
- Josef Kölschbach
- Adrian Johan Korteweg
- Otakar Kubín
- Alfred Loeb
- Helmuth Macke
- Louis Marcoussis
- Corrado-Alberto Mazzei
- Jean Metzinger
- Alexander Mogilewsky
- Louis Moilliet
- Piet Mondrian
- Ernst Sonderegger
- Jakob Steinhardt
- Curt Stoermer
- Charles de Tholey
- Erich Wichmann
- Ortiz de Zarate
- As well as Russian, Indian, Turkish, Japanese und Chinese paintings from the collections of and Kandinsky that were not for sale.

== Bibliography ==
- Hüneke, Andreas, ed. (1986). Der blaue Reiter: Dokumente e. geistigen Bewegung. Reclams Universal-Bibliothek (1. Aufl ed.). Leipzig: Reclam.
- Peter Selz: „Der Erste Deutsche Herbstsalon. Berlin 1913“, Klüser, Bernd; Hegewisch, Katharina (1995). Die Kunst der Ausstellung: eine Dokumentation dreißig exemplarischer Kunstausstellungen dieses Jahrhunderts (in German). Frankfurt am Main: Insel. ISBN 978-3-458-16203-2. OCLC 901145234.
- Presler, Gerd (2003). "Ein Mann sät Sturm". Art. 2003 (2): 66–72.
- Ursula Prinz, Futuristen in Berlin in Belli, Gabriella; Martin-Gropius-Bau (Berlin, Allemagne) (2009). Sprachen des Futurismus Literatur, Malerei, Skulptur, Musik, Theater, Fotografie: [Exposition (in German). Berlin: Jovis. ISBN 978-3-86859-066-1. OCLC 690403191.
- Adriani, Götz; Thomas, Karin; Kunsthalle (Tübingen, Allemagne) (2001). Henri Rousseau: der Zöllner : Grenzgänger zur Moderne : [exposition, Tübingen, Kunsthalle, 3 février-17 juin 2001 (in German). DuMont. ISBN 978-3-7701-5590-3. OCLC 492759032.
- Bilang, Karla (2013). Frauen im "STURM" Künstlerinnen der Moderne. Berlin. ISBN 978-3-932338-57-1. OCLC 864471251.
