= Lothar Erdmann =

German journalist (1888–1939)

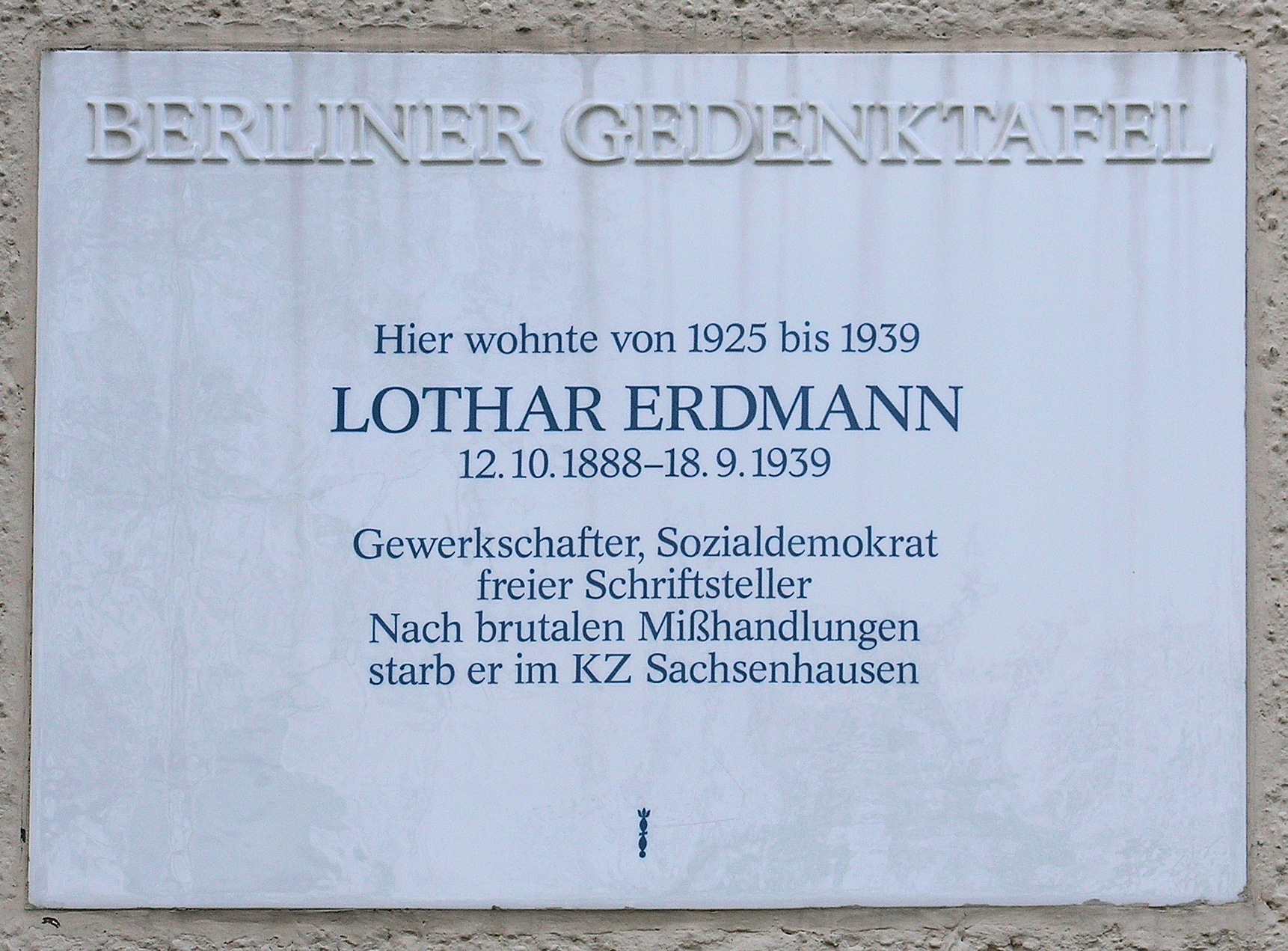
Berlin memorial plaque at Erdmann's house, Adolf-Scheidt-Platz 3, Tempelhof, Berlin

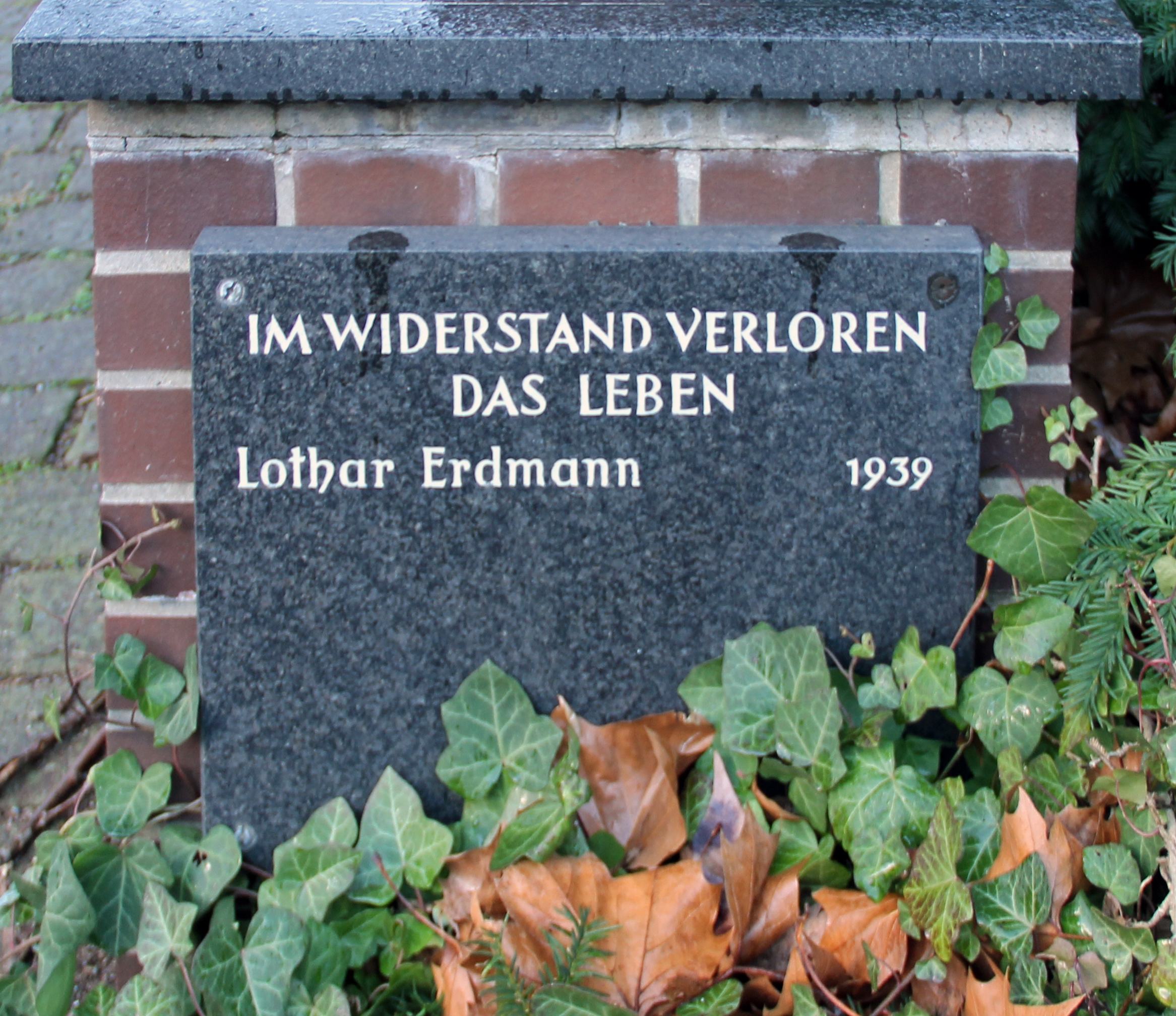
Memorial plaque at Gottlieb-Dunkel-Straße 27, Tempelhof.

Karl Hermann Dietrich Lothar Erdmann (German: [ˈeːɐ̯tman]; 12 October 1888 – 18 September 1939) was a German journalist. During the Weimar Republic he was the editor of the trade union theory organ Die Arbeit. He was a main supporter of the turning away of trade unions from social democracy at the end of the Republic. Despite his rapprochement with National Socialism, he died after maltreatment in the Sachsenhausen concentration camp.

== Early years ==
Erdmann was born in Breslau. His father was the philosopher Benno Erdmann. He attended the municipal grammar school in Bonn after his father had been appointed to the university. Later he studied history and philosophy. He was a student of Friedrich Meinecke. In England Erdmann met George Bernard Shaw. Through this he came into contact with the Fabian Society. He in turn came to socialism. From then on he did not want to pursue an academic career, but wished to become a journalist.

Before he could establish himself in this sector, the First World War broke out. Erdmann volunteered and was deployed on the Western front. Here he was a company commander and was promoted to lieutenant. The death of his friend August Macke affected him deeply and led to a change in his attitude toward war. A severe nervous breakdown in 1916 put an end to the front assignment. Instead, he was detached to the Wolffs Telegraphisches Bureau. Erdmann worked for this company in Amsterdam as a translator. In 1916 he married Elisabeth Macke, née Gerhardt, the widow of his friend August Macke. Three children were born out of this marriage including Dietrich Erdmann.

During this stay he got in touch with leading representatives of the International Federation of Trade Unions (1901–1945). He favored a very moderate direction and rejected radical trade union ideas. His conception of socialism was associated with a strong sense of national identities.

== Weimar Republic ==
After the end of the war Erdmann returned to Germany. There he became a member of the Social Democratic Party of Germany (SPD). He worked in Cologne as an editor of the Rheinische Zeitung. As a friend of Macke, Erdmann also arranged his artistic estate. One of the first larger works about Macke was created. It appeared in 1928 in an anthology published by Ernst Jünger under the title Die Unvergessenen.

After some time in Germany, Erdmann worked in Amsterdam as a press officer for the International Trade Union Confederation. When he again returned to Germany, he founded the newspaper Die Arbeit in 1924. This was the theoretical journal of the Allgemeiner Deutscher Gewerkschaftsbund. He was commissioned by the latter to act as trade union secretary for the Berlin area. Erdmann remained editor-in-chief of the new journal until 1933, from which position he was able to exert considerable influence on the trade union leadership's attitude toward current issues. Erdmann was also a close collaborator of the union boss Theodor Leipart. Before the 1930 German federal election, Erdmann said that it was not the National Socialists with their (supposedly) lesser following, but instead the German People's Party and the German National People's Party, which could possibly form an alliance with the NSDAP, that would be a danger to "democratic socialism".

In 1932 Erdmann tried to win Kurt von Schleicher for the support of the trade unions. Erdmann, who was also active as a speech writer for Leipart, was instrumental in introducing ideas from Ernst Jünger's publication The Worker: Dominion and Form into the trade union environment.

== Approach to the Nazi regime ==
In the last issue of his journal of April 29, 1933, Erdmann's article Nation, Gewerkschaften und Sozialismus (Nation, Trade Unions, and Socialism) appeared, which, like Heinrich August Winkler assumes, was in essence agreed with Leipart. In this article, Erdmann distanced himself from the SPD in a hitherto unknown sharpness and emphasized the difference in character with the trade unions. According to Erdmann, the Marxism of the trade unions had never been a belief in a single-minded theory. We are socialists because we are Germans. And precisely for this reason the goal for us is not socialism, but socialist Germany. (...) German socialism grows from German history into the future living space of the German people. Socialist Germany will never become a reality without the nationalization of the socialist movement. For Erdmann, National Socialism was a logical consequence of the Treaty of Versailles and the inability of the SPD to transform itself into a national party. He ended his contribution with an appeal to the National Socialists to integrate the trade unions into the new State. The national organization of labor, which they have built up in decades of hard struggle and immense effort, supported by the trust and sacrifice of the German workers, is a national value which the allied forces of the national revolution must also respect and guard, especially the great movement which claims that its revolution is both national and socialist. (...) Even if the trade unions have to give up many things that represented their historical nature, they do not need to change their motto 'Through socialism to the nation' if the national revolution follows its will for socialism with socialist deeds. Erdmann was not alone with these theses. Other younger ADGB functionaries at the middle level also shared his positions, for example Walter Pahl.

== Last years and death in concentration camp ==
The goal of ensuring the survival of the trade unions by largely adapting to the regime was not successful. When the trade-union headquarters were occupied on the Tag der nationalen Arbeit (2 May 1933), Erdmann lost his employment. Subsequently, he worked as a writer and freelance journalist. However, he could only publish in a few newspapers and magazines. He mainly wrote reviews of books and about visual artists.

At the beginning of the Second World War, he was arrested as part of the Kriegs-Sonderaktion. Erdmann was taken to Sachsenhausen concentration camp. There he protested against the mistreatment of a fellow prisoner upon his arrival. As a result, he was forced to punish himself, which was extended by one hour a day. After six days he collapsed, which was interpreted as insubordination. Now followed three hours of "hanging from the post" as well as numerous blows and kicks. Finally he died from the enormous internal injuries.

His estate holdings are located in the Archiv der sozialen Demokratie.

== Honour and remembrance ==
In 1960, the German Democratic Republic postal authority issued a stamp series of portraits of anti-fascists murdered in a concentration camp. The 5 pfennig stamp shows the portrait of Erdmann.

In the ring wall of the Gedenkstätte der Sozialisten in the Zentralfriedhof Friedrichsfelde, Erdmann is also remembered on a red porphyry plaque.

At his house in Tempelhof the Senate of Berlin had a Berliner Gedenktafel affixed.

In 2003 in the Gedenkstätte und Museum Sachsenhausen, above all, former active trade union functionaries whose fate is little known were honoured.

In 2004 Ilse Fischer published a biographical study about Erdmann, which also contains his diary entries.
