= August-Macke-Haus =

House museum in Germany

Coordinates: 50°44′15″N 7°5′10″E

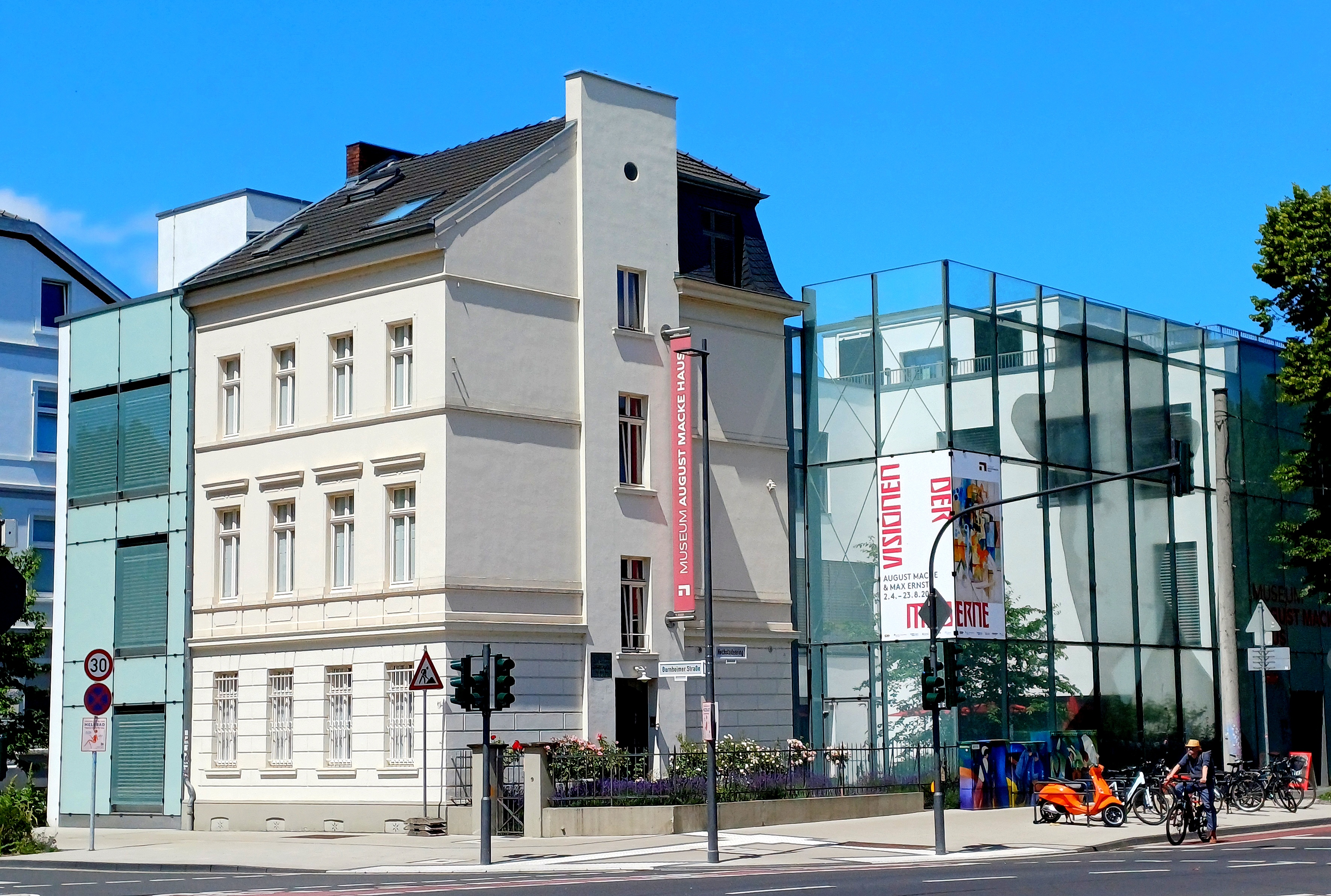
The August-Macke Haus in Bonn

The August-Macke-Haus or August Macke House is a museum in Bonn, Germany, opened in 1991, dedicated to the expressionist painter August Macke. It is located in Macke's former home, where he lived from 1911 to 1914. The museum displays reconstructed interiors and houses temporary exhibitions, usually focusing on Expressionism. In the August-Macke-Haus, Macke's studio has been restored, including furniture from his Tegernsee days. A basic archive of Rhenish Expressionism is available in addition to a reference library.

== History ==
On 5 October 1909 August Macke married his long-time girlfriend, Elisabeth Gerhardt. The couple first lived on Tegernsee, then moved to Bonn. Macke painted continuously, was increasingly finding his direction and urgently needed a studio. This was set up in the attic of the house of his mother-in-law, Sophie Gerhardt, built in 1877–1878, at Bornheimer Strasse 88 (now 96); the renovation was carried out according to plans by the Bonn architect Hermann Schmitt. The father-in-law, the entrepreneur Carl Heinrich Gerhardt, had bought the house in 1884 as his company's archive and furnished it for the purpose. He died in 1907. In February 1911 Macke moved into this house with his wife and son Walter. The studio was Macke's first and only. The few years when was able to work there turned out to be his most productive. The artist completed more than 400 paintings while living in the house. He also often painted his surroundings, the view from the house, the streets and the garden. At the time, Macke had made relatively long journeys to know better modern painting, innovative artists and new surroundings. In the place where he now lived, he welcomed people like Franz Marc, Max Ernst, Guillaume Apollinaire, Robert Delaunay, Gabriele Münter and Paul Klee. With Franz Marc, Macke painted the large mural Paradise on the studio wall in 1912. It was dismantled in 1980 and is now in the Westphalian State Museum of Art and Cultural History in Münster. It was replaced by a copy in the original size, now on display in the Macke Museum.

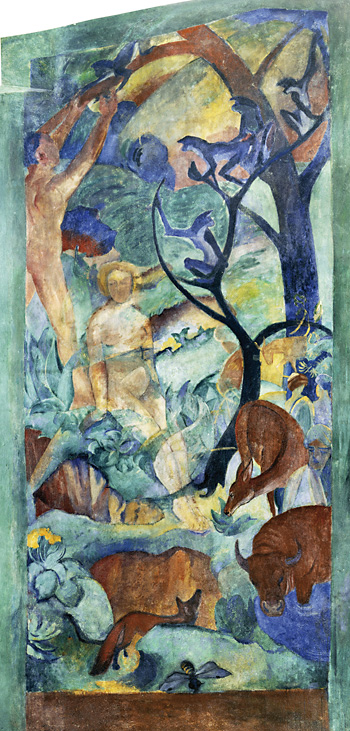
Paradise (1912), the mural by August Macke and Franz Marc

In 1914, shortly after the start of the World War I, Macke was killed in action in France at the age of 27. After two years, his widow married a friend of her husband's, Lothar Erdmann. She lived with him and Macke's two sons (Erdmann's two children would come later) in the same house until 1925, when she moved to Berlin. The house was then rented, but not the studio. Her second husband died in Sachsenhausen concentration camp in 1939. Elisabeth returned to the house in 1948 and set up in the studio, in which she lived until 1975, before moving back to Berlin, where she died in 1978.

A bronze plaque commemorating August Macke was attached to the house in the presence of the students who had suggested it and Ms. Erdmann-Macke in 1972 and still hangs there.

The house, which had not been listed until then, was acquired by a building contractor from Berlin who wanted to gutt the house and convert it into a restaurant, after the above-mentioned mural had been translocated. Margarethe Jochimsen, chairwoman of the Bonner Kunstverein, founded a citizens' initiative to put the house under a preservation order and thus prevent the renovation. In 1989 the association "August Macke Haus" was founded, which became responsible for the museum's artistic program. In the same year the house was taken by the state of North Rhine-Westphalia and the sponsor and building contractor Herbert Hillebrand bought it to be properly renovated, to have Macke's studio restored and open to the public.

On 26 September 1991 the August-Macke-Haus was officially opened in the presence of the then Prime Minister of North Rhine-Westphalia, Johannes Rau. Margarethe Jochimsen was the founding director. The financial sponsor of the house, the "August Macke Haus der Sparkasse Bonn Foundation", was founded in 1994.

== See also ==
- List of single-artist museums
