= Grethe Jürgens =

German painter

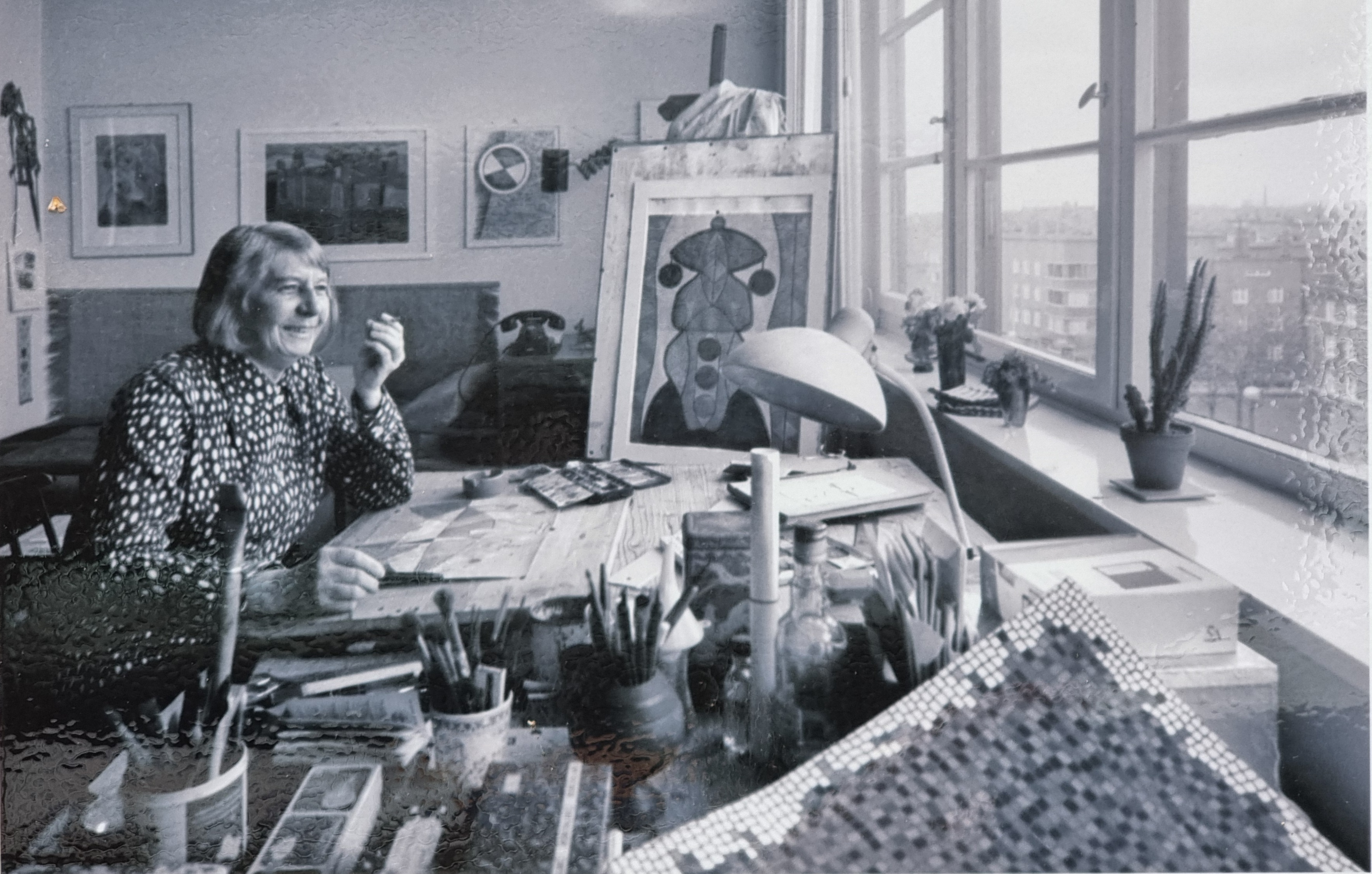
A 1972 photo of Grete Jürgens in her home studio in Hanover

Grethe Jürgens (February 15, 1899 – May 8, 1981) was a German painter associated with the New Objectivity.

Jürgens was born in Holzhausen and grew up in Wilhelmshaven. In 1918 she enrolled in the Technische Hochschule in Berlin (now Technische Universität Berlin), where she studied architecture. From 1919 until 1922 she studied at the Hanover School of Arts and Crafts under Fritz Burgr-Mühlfeld. She was employed in advertising as a draftswoman for the Hackethal Wire Company in Hanover from 1923 to 1927, and she continued afterward to work as a freelance commercial artist. Her paintings from this period, such as Garden Picture (1928) and Employment Exchange (1929), show the influence of French artists such as Henri Rousseau and Auguste Herbin.

From 1931 to 1932, Jürgens co-edited the 12-issue run of the magazine Der Wachsbogen with fellow artist Gerta Overbeck. The journal served as a theoretical organ of the Hanover artists of the New Objectivity movement. In an essay she published in the magazine, she described the group's artistic approach:

One paints a landscape, trees, houses, vehicles, and sees the world in a new way. Unemployed people, tramps, or beggars are painted, not because they are "interesting characters" ... or through a desire to appeal to the sympathy of society, but because one suddenly realizes that it is in these people that the most powerful expression of the present time is to be found.

In 1932, she participated in the exhibition "Neue Sachlichkeit in Hanover" ("New Objectivity in Hanover") at the Herzog Anton Ulrich Museum in Brunswick. In 1933, she had a solo exhibition in Cologne. After 1933, she worked extensively as an illustrator and designer of book covers. In 1951, the Wilhelm Busch Museum in Hanover presented a retrospective exhibition of her works.

Jürgens died in 1981 in Hanover.
