= Gerta Overbeck =

German photographer (1895-1938)

Gerta Overbeck-Schenk
- Born: January 16, 1898; Dortmund, Germany
- Died: March 2, 1977 (aged 79); Lünen, Germany
- Known for: Painting
- Movement: New Objectivity

Gerta Overbeck (1898-1977) was a German painter known for her participation in Neue Sachlichkeit (New Objectivity) .

Overbeck was born on January 16, 1898 in Dortmund, Germany. She studied at the Kunstgewerbeschule Düsseldorf and later at the Kunstgewerbeschule in Hannover where one of her teachers was Fritz Burger-Mühlfeld. Overbeck co-published the journal Wachsbogen with her friend and colleague Grethe Jürgens from 1931 to 1932.

In 1937 she married fellow artist Gustav Schenk (Schriftsteller) (1905–1969) with whom she had a child. The couple divorced in 1940.

Overbeck died on March 2, 1977 in Lünen, Germany.

Her work was included in the 1997 exhibition The New Objectivity: Realism in Weimar-Era Germany at the Galerie St. Etienne in New York City, as well as the 2023 exhibition Look at the People! at the Kunstmuseum Stuttgart, as well as the 2024 exhibition Splendor and Misery. New Objectivity in Germany at the Leopold Museum.

Her work is in the collection of the Museum der Stadt Lünen and the Museum für Kunst und Kulturgeschichte Dortmund.
