= Margarethe Jochimsen =

German curator, art critic and museum director

Margarethe Jochimsen, née Müller, (14 August 1931 - 15 September 2016) was a German curator, art critic and museum director.

== Life and career ==
Müller studied political science and art history. In 1961 she married the politician Reimut Jochimsen (1933-1999), with whom she had a daughter and a son. From 1978 to 1986 Jochimsen was director of the Bonner Kunstverein as an art historian with a doctorate and its chairman until 1996. In 1988 she was the initiator for the rescue of the house of August Macke in Bonn; subsequently she was the founding director of the August-Macke-Haus in 1991 and headed it until 2002. Among other things she was editor of the series of publications of the association August Macke Haus.

Müller died in Freiburg im Breisgau at age 85.

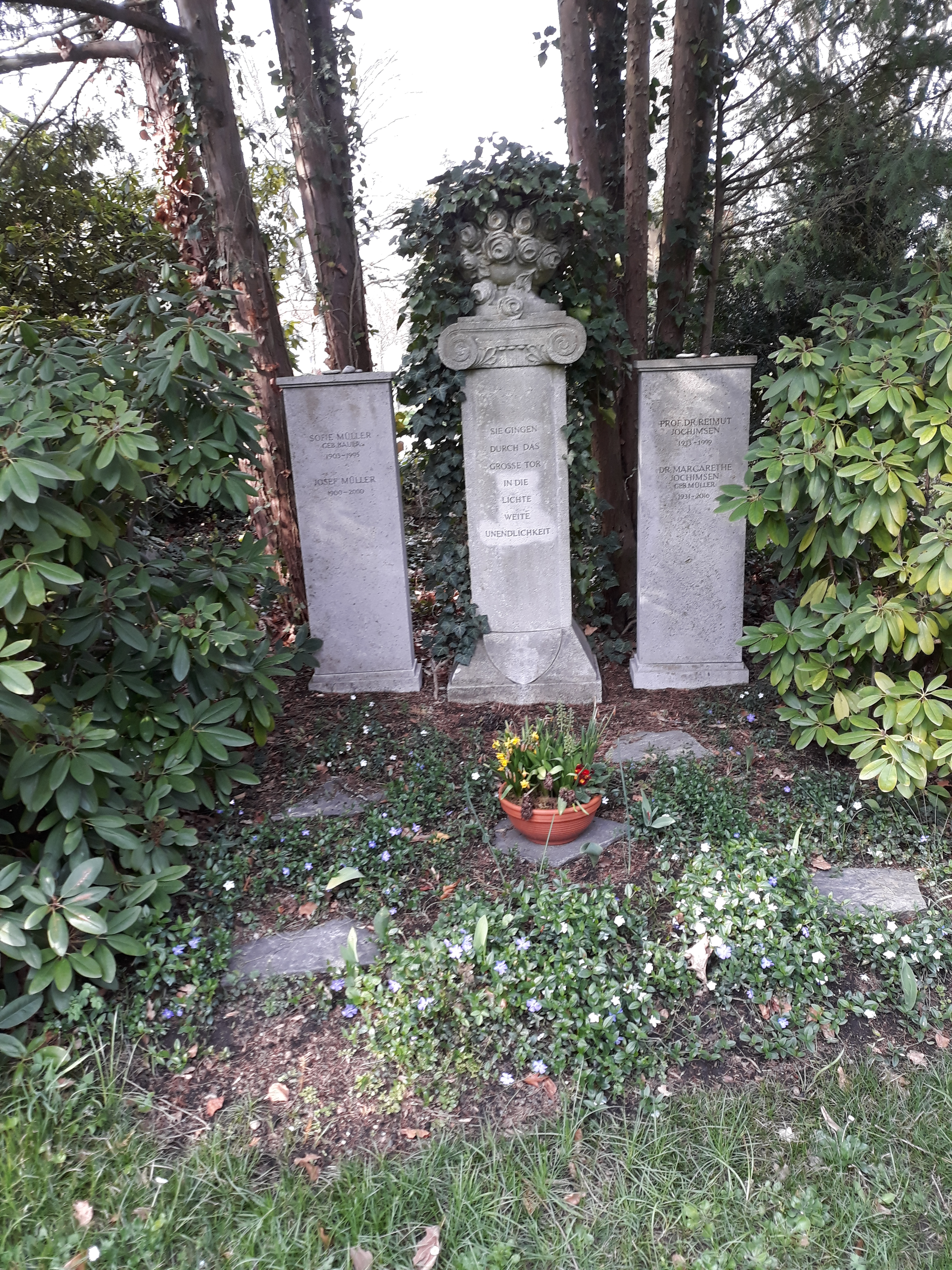
Family grave of Margarethe Jochimsen with parents and husband Reimut, Hauptfriedhof Freiburg (Breisgau)

== Honours ==
- 2004: Bundesverdienstkreuz 1. Klasse.
- 2017: Honour for life and work by the Bonner Kunstverein on 29 January 2017.
