= List of works by August Macke =

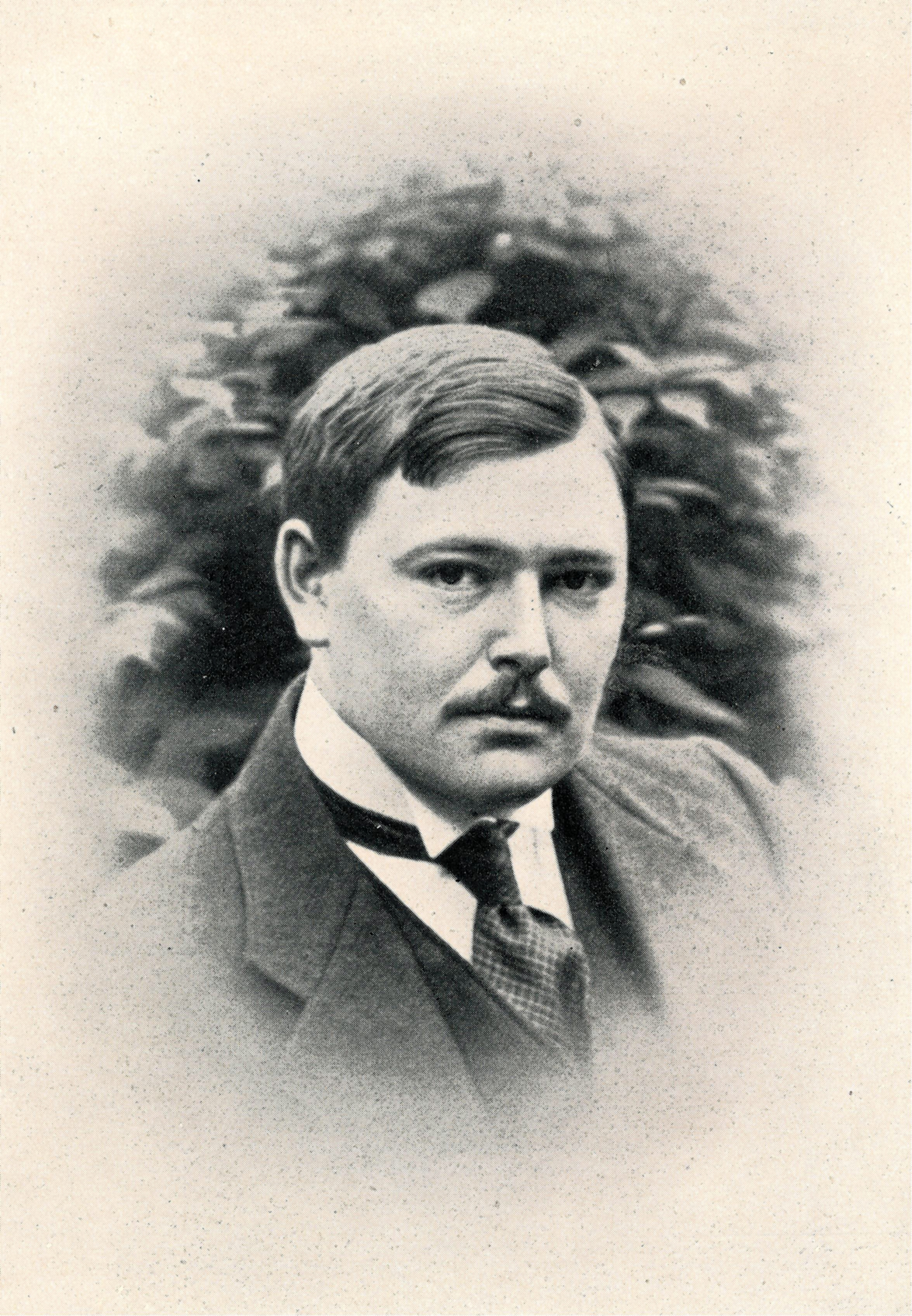
August Macke, 1913

This article lists a selection of notable works created by August Macke. The listing follows the book August Macke, 1887-1914.

== Paintings ==
Image Title in German	Year Title in English	Location	Made from Material H x W in cm Wikimedia
Selbstbildnis	1906; Self-portrait	Westphalian State Museum of Art and Cultural History, Münster	Oil paint Canvas; 54.2 x 35.4; More images
Ottilie Macke mit weißer Bluse	1907; Ottilie Macke with white blouse	Westphalian State Museum of Art and Cultural History, Münster	Oil paint Cardboard; 63.5 x 47.5; More images
Wäsche im Garten in Kandern	1907; Laundry in the garden in Kandern	Museum für Neue Kunst, Freiburg	More images
Selbstporträt	1907; Self-portrait	Westphalian State Museum of Art and Cultural History, Münster	25.6 x 19; More images
Angler am Rhein	1907; Anglers on the Rhine	Lenbachhaus, Munich	Oil paint Paperboard; 40.3 × 44.5; More images
Am Rhein bei Hersel	1908; On the Rhine near Hersel		More images
Sonniger Garten	1908; Sunny garden	Private collection	Oil paint Canvas; 50.8 x 66; More images
Frau des Künstlers mit Hut	1909; Wife of the artist with hat	Westphalian State Museum of Art and Cultural History, Münster	Oil paint Canvas; 49.7 x 34; More images
Porträt mit Äpfeln: Frau des Künstlers	1909; Portrait with Apples (Portrait of the Artist's Wife)	Lenbachhaus, Munich	Oil paint Canvas; 66 x 59.5; More images
Selbstbildnis mit Hut	1909; Self Portrait with Hat	Kunstmuseum Bonn	Oil paint Panel; 41 x 32.5; More images
Stickende Frau im Sessel	1909; Embroidering Woman in an Armchair		More images
Elisabeth am Schreibtisch	1909; Elisabeth at her desk	Westphalian State Museum of Art and Cultural History, Münster	Oil paint Panel; 22 x 16; More images
Waldbach	1910; Forest creek	Eskenazi Museum of Art, Bloomington, IN	Oil paint Canvas; 61.6 × 61.4; More images
Landschaft am Tegernsee mit lesendem Mann	1910; Landscape at Lake Tegernsee with a man reading		Oil paint Canvas; 21.6 × 23.6; More images
Segelboot auf dem Tegernsee	1910; Sailing boat on the Tegernsee	Albertina	Oil paint Canvas; 72 x 50.5; More images
Staudacherhaus am Tegernsee	1910; Staudacherhaus at Lake Tegernsee		More images
Tegernsee Landschaft	1910; Tegernsee Landscape	Germanisches Nationalmuseum, Nuremberg	Oil paint Canvas; 67 x 66.4; More images
Unsere Straße in Grau	1911; Our street in grey	Lenbachhaus, Munich	Oil paint Canvas; 80 x 57.5; More images
Straße mit Kirche in Kandern	1911; Street with church in Kandern	Museum für Neue Kunst, Freiburg	80 x 102; More images
Marienkirche im Schnee	1911; St.Mary's in the Snow	Kunsthalle, Hamburg	Oil paint Card stock 105 x 80; More images
Gartenbild	1911; Garden Picture		Oil paint Canvas; 70 x 88; More images
Der Sturm	1911; The Storm	Saarland Museum, Saarbrücken	Oil paint Canvas; 70 x 88; More images
Amerikanische Ureinwohner auf Pferden	1911; Native Americans on Horses	Lenbachhaus, Munich	Oil paint 44 x 60; More images
Marienkirche mit Häusern und Schornstein (Bonn)	1911; St. Mary's Church with houses and chimney (Bonn)	Kunstmuseum, Bonn	Oil paint Canvas; 66 x 57.4; More images
Cirkusbild I: Kunstreiterin mit Clowns	1911; Circus picture I: Artistic rider with clowns	Westphalian State Museum of Art and Cultural History, Münster	Mischtechnik; 47 x 63; More images
Gartenweg	1912; Garden Path	Westphalian State Museum of Art and Cultural History, Münster	Oil paint Canvas; 81 x 59; More images
Farbige Komposition I	1912; Colourful composition I	Wilhelm-Hack-Museum, Ludwigshafen	Oil paint Cardboard; 102 x 82; More images
Farbige Komposition II: Großer Blumenteppich	1912; Colourful composition II: Large carpet of flowers	Private collection	Oil paint Cardboard; 80.5 x 101; More images
Wandteppich mit orientalischem Liebespaar	1912; Tapestry with Oriental Lovers	Bundesrepublik Deutschland	Tapestry; 120 x 210; More images
Abend	1912; Evening	Private collection	Oil paint Canvas; 88 x 70; More images
Gartenrestaurant	1912; Garden Restaurant	Kunstmuseum, Bonn	Oil paint Canvas; 81 x 105; More images
Kinder mit Ziege	1912; Children with goat	Westphalian State Museum of Art and Cultural History, Münster	Gouache paint Canvas; 58 x 38; More images
Großes helles Schaufenster	1912; Large Bright Showcase	Sprengel Museum, Hanover	Oil paint Canvas; 106.8 x 82.8; More images
Paar im Walde	1912; Couple in the forest	Private collection	Oil paint Canvas; 100 x 100; More images
Paradies	1912; Paradise; Cooperation with Franz Marc	Westphalian State Museum of Art and Cultural History, Münster	Tempera on oil Plaster (mural); 400 x 200; More images
Russisches Ballett 1	1912; Russian Ballet I	Kunsthalle, Bremen	Oil paint Cardboard; 103 x 81; More images
Spaziergang auf der Brücke	1912; Walk on the bridge	Hessisches Landesmuseum, Darmstadt	Oil paint Canvas; 86 x 100; More images
Spaziergänger am See I	1912; Strollers by the Lake I	Private collection	More images
Zoologischer Garten I	1912; Zoological Garden I	Lenbachhaus, Munich	Oil paint Canvas; 100.6 x 80.6; More images
Kinder im Garten	1912; Children in the garden	Kunstmuseum Bonn	More images
Vier Mädchen	1912 to 1913; Four girls	Museum Kunstpalast	Oil paint Canvas; 105 x 81; More images
Spaziergang in Blumen	1912 to 1914; Walk in flowers	Berlin State Museums	More images
Zirkus	1913; Circus	Thyssen-Bornemisza Museum, Madrid	Oil paint Canvas; 47 x 63.5; More images
Husaren	1913; Hussars on a Sortie	Thyssen-Bornemisza Museum, Madrid	Oil paint Canvas; 37.5 x 56.1
Farbige Formen I.	1913; Coloured Forms I.	Westphalian State Museum of Art and Cultural History, Münster	Oil paint 53.1 x 38.5; More images
Paar auf dem Waldweg	1913; Couple on the forest track	Private collection	Oil paint Cardboard; 81.5 x 61.5; More images
Frauen im Park (mit weißem Schirm)	1913; Women in the Park (with white umbrella)	Private collection	Oil paint Cardboard; 45.5 x 33; More images
Garten am Thuner See	1913; Garden on Lake Thun	Kunstmuseum, Bonn	Oil paint Canvas; 49 x 65; More images
Spaziergänger	1913; Strollers	Westphalian State Museum of Art and Cultural History, Münster	Oil paint 81 x 103.5; More images
Badende Mädchen mit Stadt im Hintergrund	1913; Bathing girls with city in the background	Pinakothek der Moderne, Munich	Oil paint Canvas; 58.5 x 98; More images
Dame in grüner Jacke	1913; Lady in Green Jacket	Museum Ludwig, Cologne	Oil paint Canvas; 44.5 x 43.5; More images
Großer Zoologischer Garten, Triptychon	1913; Great Zoological Garden, Triptych	Museum Ostwall, Dortmund	Oil paint Canvas; 129.5 x 230.5; More images
Hutladen	1913; Milliner's Shop	Lenbachhaus, Munich	Oil paint Canvas; 54.5 x 44; More images
Leute am blauen See	1913; People on the Blue Lake	Staatliche Kunsthalle Karlsruhe	Oil paint Canvas; 60 x 48.5; More images
Kinder mit Ziege II	1913; Children with goat II	Lenbachhaus, Munich	24 x 34; More images
Mit gelber Jacke	1913; With yellow jacket	Ulmer Museum	Oil paint Canvas; 29.8 x 45; More images
Modegeschäft	1913; Fashion shop	Westphalian State Museum of Art and Cultural History, Münster	Oil paint Canvas; 50.8 x 61; More images
Mädchen vor dem Springbrunnen	1913; Girl in front of the fountain	Westphalian State Museum of Art and Cultural History, Münster	Oil paint Canvas; 142 x 73.5; More images
Promenade	1913; Promenade	Lenbachhaus, Munich	Oil paint Cardboard; 57 x 51; More images
Sonniger Weg	1913; Sunny way	Westphalian State Museum of Art and Cultural History, Münster	Oil paint Canvas; 30 x 50; More images
Zwei Maedchen	1913; Two girls	Städel Museum, Frankfurt	Oil paint Canvas; 130 x 100; More images
Drei Mädchen mit gelben Strohhüten I	1913; Three girls in yellow straw hats I	Kunstmuseum, Den Haag	Oil paint Canvas; 60 x 48.5; More images
Mädchen mit Fischglocke	1914; Girl with fish bell	Von der Heydt-Museum, Wuppertal	Canvas; 80.5 x 100; More images
Eine Ladenstraße unter Lauben	1914; A shopping street under arbours	Private collection	Watercolor painting 55 x 43; More images
Kairouan III	1914; Kairouan III	Westphalian State Museum of Art and Cultural History, Münster	Watercolor; Pencil; 22.5 x 28.9; More images
Tunesisches Hafenbild	1914; Tunisian Harbour	Westphalian State Museum of Art and Cultural History, Münster	Oil paint Canvas; 55 x 45; More images
Felsige Landschaft	1914; Rocky landscape		Watercolor; 20 x 24; More images
Eselreiter	1914; Donkey Rider	Kunstmuseum, Bonn	Watercolor; 24 x 28.5; More images
Blick in eine Gasse	1914; View into a Lane	Gelsenkirchen Art Museum	Watercolor; 29 x 22.5; More images
Das helle Haus	1914; The bright house		Watercolor; 26 x 20; More images
Händler mit Krügen	1914; Traders with jugs	Westphalian State Museum of Art and Cultural History, Münster	Watercolor; 26.5 x 20.5; More images
Im Basar	1914; In the bazaar		Watercolor; 28 x 22; More images
Innenhof des Landhauses in St. Germain	1914; Inner courtyard of the country house in St. Germain	Kunstmuseum, Bonn	Watercolor; 26 x 20; More images
Landschaft bei Hammamet	1914; Landscape near Hammamet		Watercolor; 20 x 24; More images
Terrasse des Landhauses in St. Germain	1914; Terrace of the country house in St. Germain	Westphalian State Museum of Art and Cultural History, Münster	Watercolor; 22 x 28; More images
Türkisches Café II	1914; Turkish Café II	Lenbachhaus, Munich	Oil paint Panel; 60 x 35.5; More images
Seiltänzer	1914; Tightrope walker	Kunstmuseum Bonn	Oil paint Canvas; 82 x 60; More images
Frau mit Sonnenschirm vor Hutladen	1914; Woman with Umbrella in Front of a Hat Shop	Museum Folkwang, Essen	More images
Landschaft mit Kühen und Kamel	1914; Landscape with Cows and Camel	Kunsthaus, Zürich	Colourant; Canvas; 47 x 54; More images
Reiter und Spaziergänger in der Allee	1914; Riders and Strollers in the Avenue	Museum Ostwall, Dortmund	Oil paint Canvas; 47 x 59.5; More images
Paar am Gartentisch	1914; Couple at the Garden Table	Private collection	Oil paint Canvas; 81 x 100.5; More images
Hutladen an der Promenade	1914; Hat shop on the promenade	Museum Ludwig, Cologne	Watercolor painting 51.5 x 73; More images
Männer auf der Terasse am See	1914; Men on the terrace by the lake	Sprengel Museum, Hanover	Watercolor painting 24.5 x 16.4; More images
Lesender Mann im Park	1914; Reading man in the park	Museum Ludwig, Cologne	More images
Große Promenade: Leute im Garten	1914; Grand Promenade: People in the Garden	Private collection	More images
Mädchen unter Bäumen	1914; Girls in Green	Alte Nationalgalerie, Berlin	Oil paint Canvas; 119.5 x 159; More images
Kathedrale zu Freiburg in der Schweiz	1914; Cathedral at Freiburg, Switzerland	Kunstsammlung Nordrhein-Westfalen, Düsseldorf	Oil paint Canvas; 60 x 50; More images
Abschied	1914; Farewell	Museum Ludwig, Cologne	Oil paint Canvas; 101 x 130.5; More images
Death in a trench of World War I by a gunshot to the head	26 September 1914		

== Museums ==
- Alte Nationalgalerie, Berlin
- Berlin State Museums
- Eskenazi Museum of Art, Bloomington, IN
- Gelsenkirchen Art Museum
- Germanisches Nationalmuseum, Nuremberg
- Hessisches Landesmuseum Darmstadt
- Kunsthalle Bremen
- Kunsthalle Hamburg
- Kunstsammlung Nordrhein-Westfalen, Düsseldorf
- Kunsthaus Zürich
- Kunstmuseum Bonn
- Kunstmuseum Den Haag
- Lenbachhaus, Munich
- Museum Folkwang, Essen
- de:Museum für Neue Kunst (Freiburg im Breisgau)
- Museum Kunstpalast, Düsseldorf
- Museum Ludwig, Cologne
- Museum Ostwall, Dortmund
- Pinakothek der Moderne, Munich
- Saarland Museum, Saarbrücken
- Sprengel Museum, Hanover
- Staatliche Kunsthalle Karlsruhe
- Städel Museum, Frankfurt
- Thyssen-Bornemisza Museum, Madrid
- Von der Heydt Museum, Wuppertal
- Ulmer Museum
- Westphalian State Museum of Art and Cultural History, Münster
- de:Wilhelm-Hack-Museum, Ludwigshafen

== Media ==
- Canvas
- Cardboard
- Card stock
- Colourant
- Gouache
- Mischtechnik
- Mural
- Oil paint
- Panel painting
- Paper
- Paperboard
- Pencil
- Plaster
- Tempera
- Watercolor painting
- Watercolor paper

== See also ==
- Donkey Rider
- Girls in Green
- Indians on Horseback
- Lady in Green Jacket
- Landscape with Cows and Camel
- Large Bright Showcase
- People on the Blue Lake
- Portrait with Apples
- Promenade (Macke)
- Woman with Umbrella in Front of a Hat Shop
