= Portrait with Apples =

Painting by August Macke

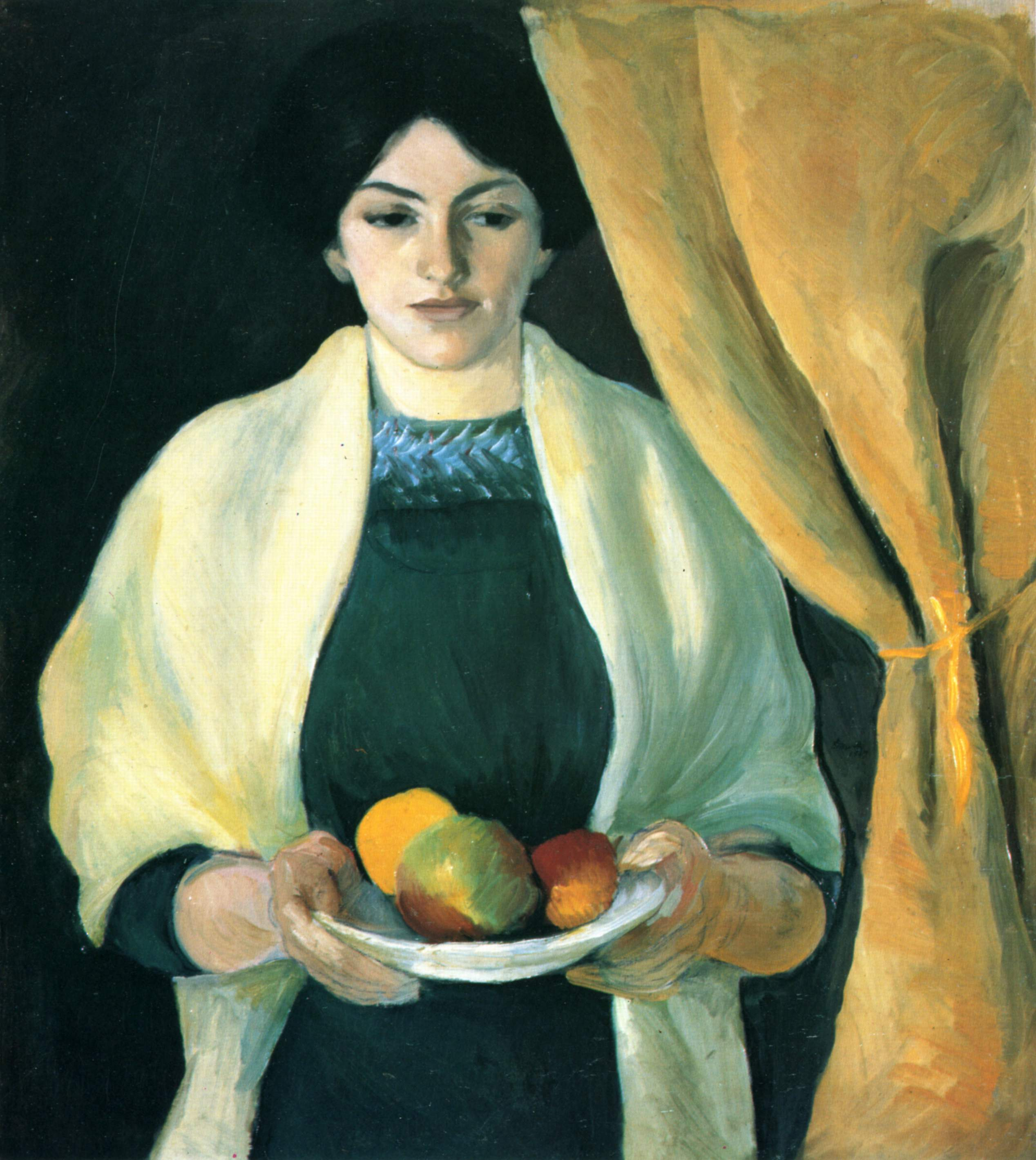
- Artist: August Macke
- Year: 1909
- Medium: Oil on canvas
- Dimensions: 66 cm × 59.5 cm (26 in × 23.4 in)
- Location: Städtische Galerie im Lenbachhaus, Munich

Portrait with Apples, also known as Elisabeth with Apples, is an oil-on-canvas painting executed in 1909 by the German Expressionist painter August Macke. It shows his wife Elisabeth Gerhardt and was created shortly after their wedding. Macke had studied the work of the Fauve artists during his honeymoon in Paris, and the painting shows their influence. It marks the beginning of his public artistic appreciation. The work belongs to the collection of the Städtische Galerie im Lenbachhaus, in Munich.

== Description ==
The painting shows the pregnant Elisabeth as a half-length figure, her quiet face turned towards the artist, but the slightly downcast eyes are directed to an imaginary point to the right, outside the frame. In her hands she holds a bowl with three apples in yellow, red and green. The figure is not in the center of the canvas, because the yellowish curtain on the right edge, gathered by a cord, moves it a little to the left. The lighting is gentle, the white cloak placed over the shoulders brightens the composition and suggests the gentle curve of her chest under the green dress. The background of the painting is brownish black and does not distract from the figure. So the artist shows his beloved wife as the main subject.

In 1912 the painting was bought by the art patron Bernhard Koehler, an uncle of Elisabeth Gerhardt, on the occasion of the Sonderbund exhibition in Cologne. Later, the Bernhard and Elly Koehler Foundation donated it to the Städtische Galerie im Lenbachhaus, in Munich, in 1965. The painting is signed in the middle right as Macke 1909, and on the back it is titled in German Porträt mit Äpfeln, Macke.

== Background ==
August Macke and Elisabeth Gerhardt married at the beginning of October 1909. Their honeymoon took them to Paris at the suggestion of Louis Moilliet. But on the first night Elisabeth, who was pregnant, began bleeding profusely and had to be taken to an hospital. There was great concern that she could miscarry. At the end of October 1909, they settled in Tegernsee, where this painting was made. This time was when the success of the artist began. Macke had studied the painting of the Fauves in Paris and become influenced by their style. Macke's early artistic phase was completed with this portrait. There are still weaknesses, for example in the representation of the hands, but Macke was now able to earn money with his works. Formally, the painting is strongly reminiscent of the late work of Paul Cézanne. While the bowl with the apples seems to consist only of “color substance”, the portrait looks like a still life. The art historian Gustav Vriesen suspects that the lighting, since the face is illuminated from the bottom left, is influenced by Edgar Degas, whose works Macke knew from the museums in Paris.

Elisabeth was always Macke's preferred model. She is special because, above all, she was one of the few individually portrayed people in his work. Many of the quiet paintings from the Tegernsee period, which are harmonious in composition, color and surroundings, show her in numerous poses, reading, sewing, holding the child, but always with lowered eyes. This gives the motif a secluded, concentrated atmosphere. Elisabeth described the creation of the picture in her book, Memory of August Macke. As a heavily pregnant woman, she could not stand for long time, so in between she sat on a chair, while the unborn child kept moving in her belly, which she described as a "happy feeling" for her. Both she and her husband liked the painting so much that it was not supposed to be sold, but Bernhard Koehler, whom Macke had given the free choice in the Sonderbund exhibition of 1912, and did not believe it was for sale, bought it.

== See also ==
- List of works by August Macke
