= Landscape with Cows and Camel =

1914 painting by August Macke

- Landschaft mit Kühen und Kamel (German)
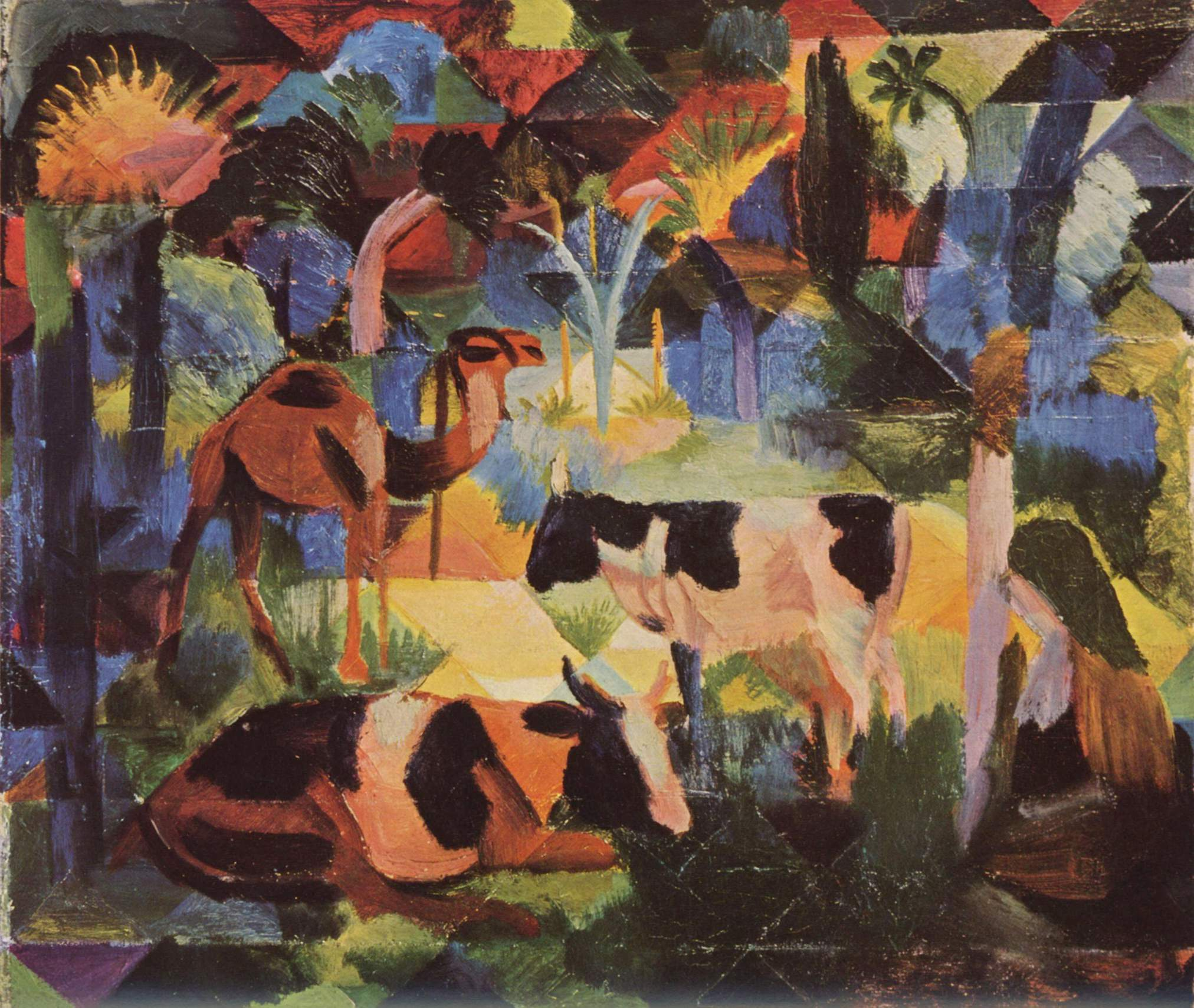
- Artist: August Macke
- Year: 1914
- Medium: Oil on canvas
- Dimensions: 47 cm × 54 cm (19 in × 21 in)
- Location: Kunsthaus, Zürich

Landscape with Cows and Camel (German: Landschaft mit Kühen und Kamel) is a 1914 oil-on-canvas painting by German Expressionist painter August Macke. It is now housed at Kunsthaus Zürich.

It depicts an exotic landscape with two cows, one lying, at the left, and the other standing, and one camel in the foreground. The background does have several palm trees. The setting and the different colours used give an exotic atmosphere to the painting. The work is drawn in an expressionist style with influences by cubism and orphism.

== See also ==
- List of works by August Macke
- Der Blaue Reiter
