= Large Bright Showcase =

Painting by August Macke

- Großes helles Schaufenster (German)
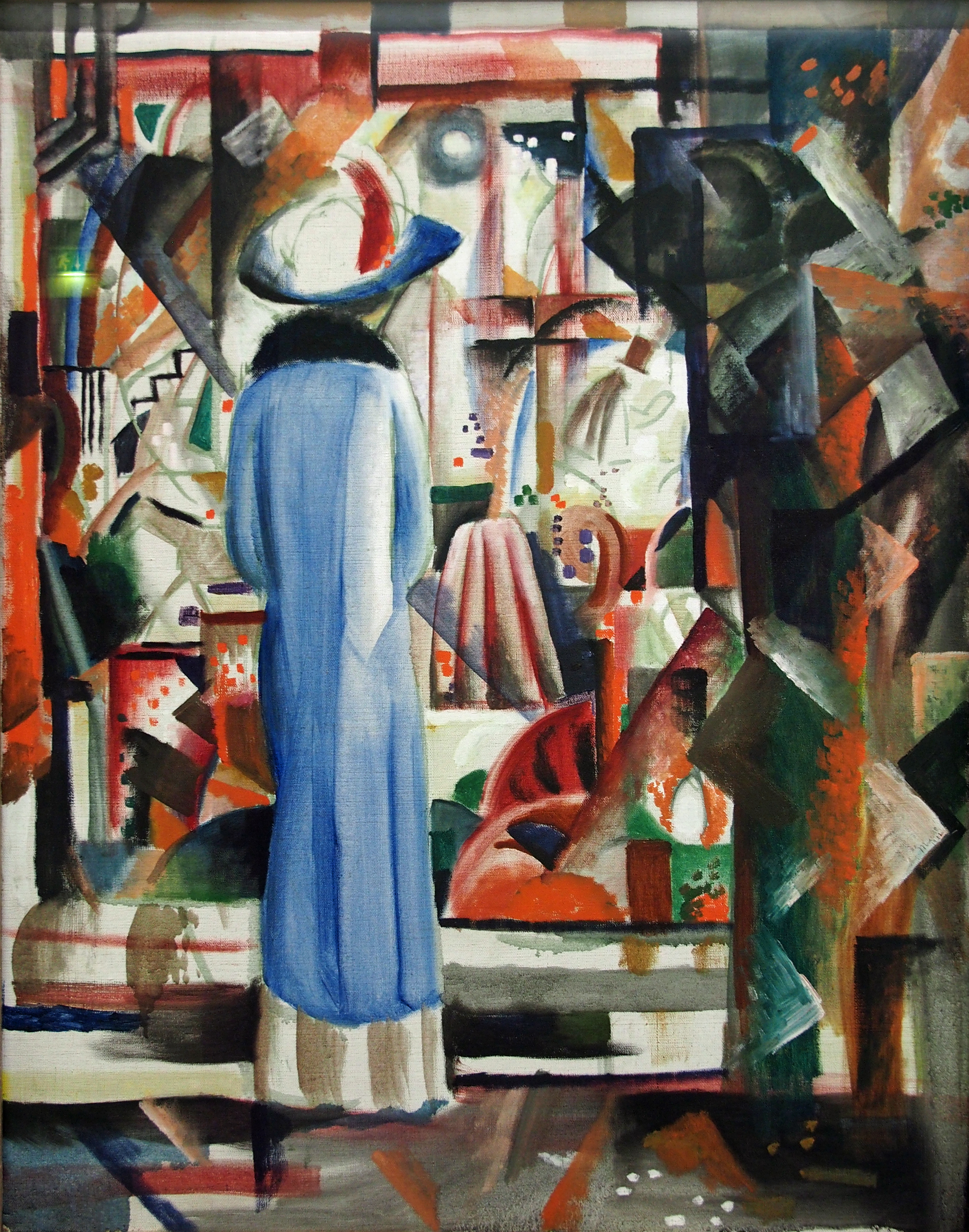
- Artist: August Macke
- Year: 1912
- Medium: Oil on canvas
- Dimensions: 106.08 cm × 82.8 cm (41.76 in × 32.6 in)
- Location: Sprengel Museum; Hanover

Large Bright Showcase is an oil-on-canvas painting by the German artist August Macke, executed in 1912. It is held at the Sprengel Museum in Hanover.

== History ==
The painting was created by Macke probably in November 1912. It was created after he had seen the canvases of the Italian Futurists at the Rhine Salon of Arts, in Cologne. The Rhine Salon presented works from a traveling exhibition of Futurists that had previously had been shown in Paris, London and in Berlin, at the gallery "Sturm". Macke had visited Cologne with his friend Franz Marc. He shared his impressions of the exhibition in letter to Bernhardt Köhler, dated of October 12, 1912.

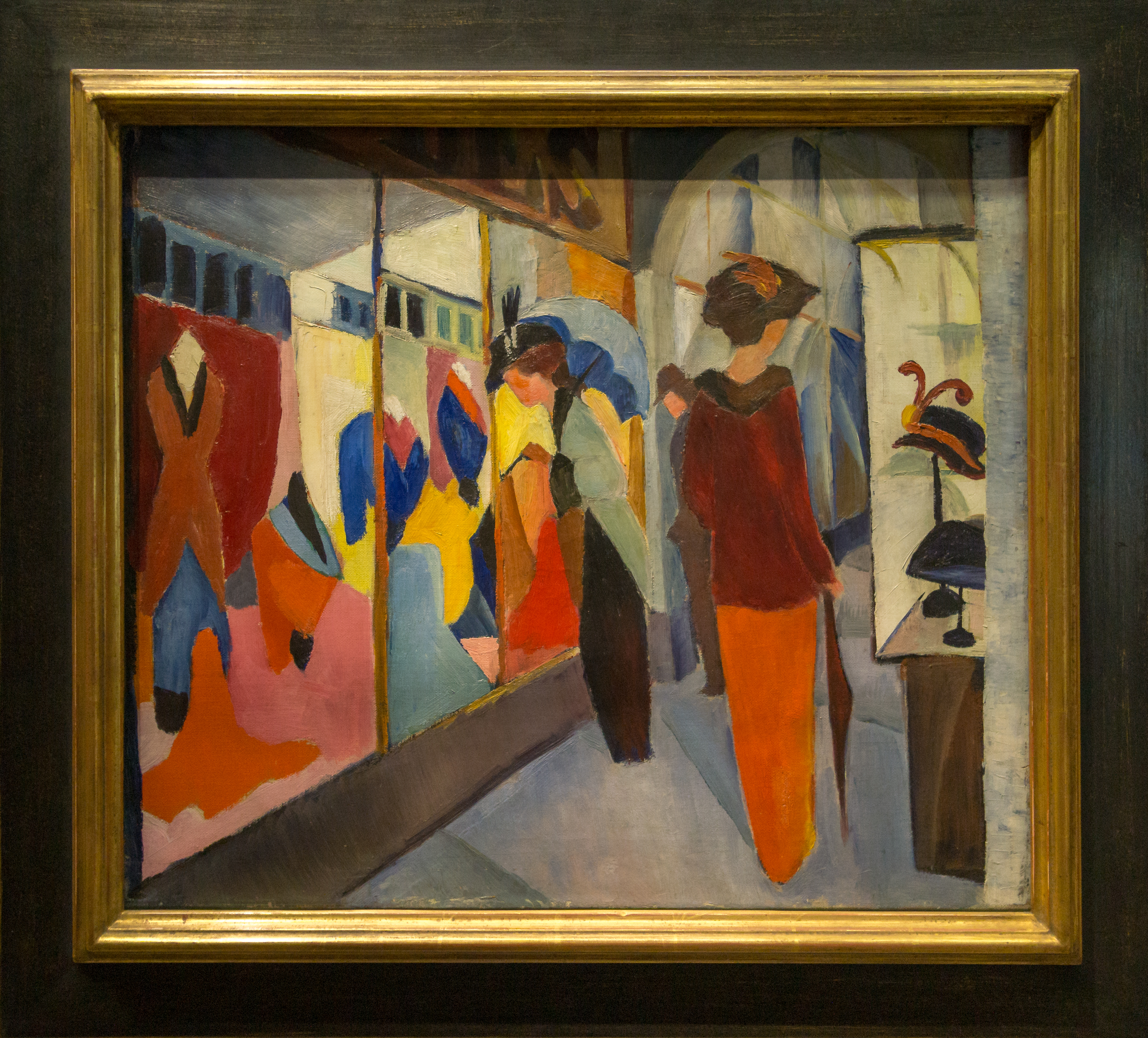
Fashion Store, 1913

A futuristic view of the big city life turned out to be a subject that appealed to Macke. Later, in 1913, the artist developed several variations of the theme of this painting, and in 1913, in Hilterfingen, he painted Fashion Store (German:Modegeschäft).

== Description ==
Macke's large-format canvas is reminiscent of Umberto Boccioni's painting The Street Enters the House (Sprengel Museum, Hanover, 1912), which was also exhibited at the Salon of Rhine. Like Boccioni, Macke's composition is centered on a female figure, but instead of houses and passers-by that are repeated and seen flowing over each other, a vortex of many reflections in the showcase glass is formed around the woman. Items displayed in a sunlit display case combine with the reflections of horses harnessed to carriages and people passing by. Mirror glass, where different plans are combined, lines whimsically intersect, embodies the bright, brilliant and hectic life of a metropolis. Paint strokes, mixing chaotically, help to visualize the street noise.

Like Boccioni, Macke uses the cubist technique, breaking into separate planes the wall of the house on the right, thus emphasizing the instability of the composition. Here he also shows the influence of Robert Delaunay, whose painting Simultaneous Windows he had seen in Paris at the end of October 1912.

== See also ==
- List of works by August Macke
