= Lady in Green Jacket =

Painting by August Macke

- Dame in grüner Jacke (German)
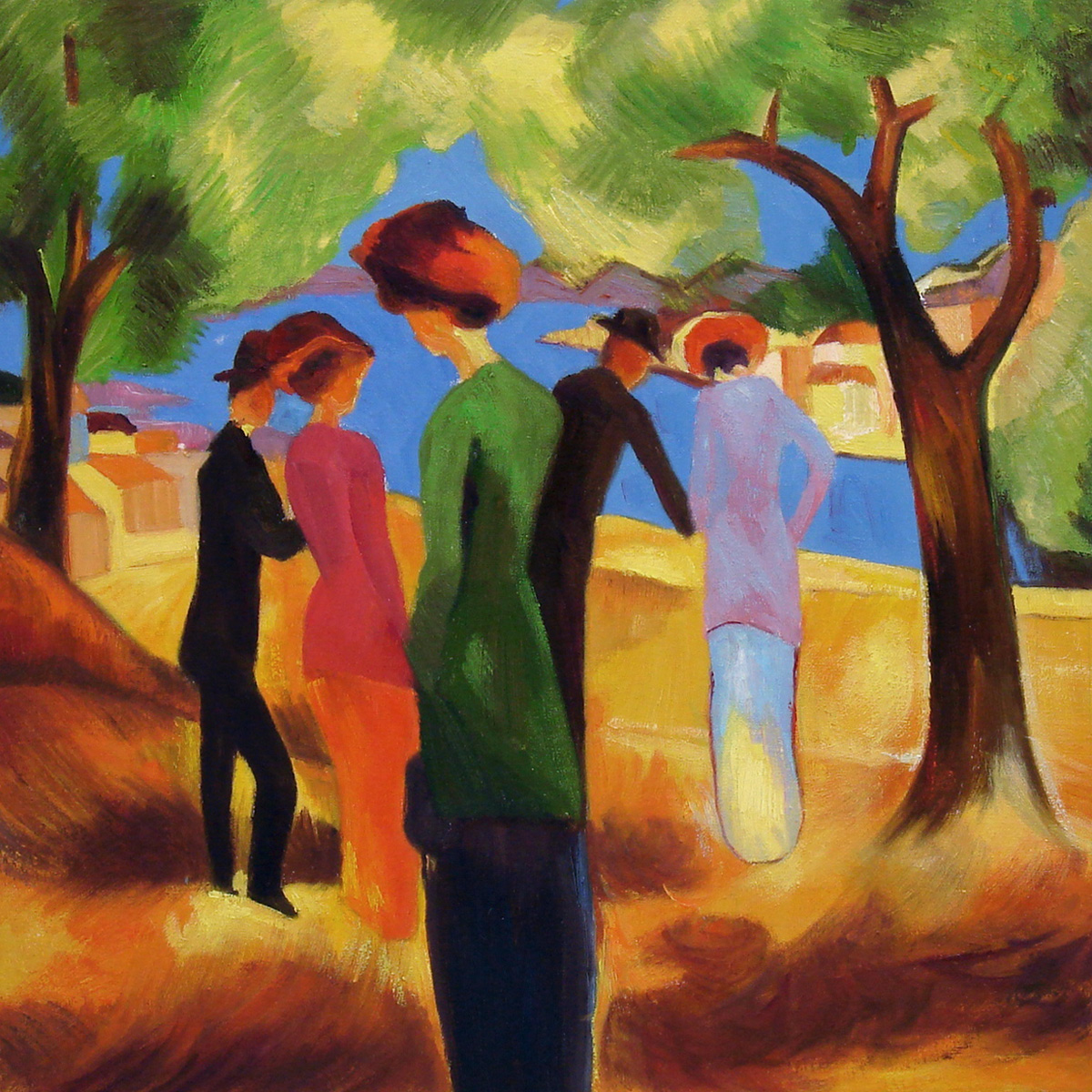
- Artist: August Macke
- Year: 1913
- Medium: Oil on canvas
- Dimensions: 44.5 cm × 43.5 cm (17.5 in × 17.1 in)
- Location: Museum Ludwig; Cologne

Lady in Green Jacket is an oil-on-canvas painting by German artist August Macke, executed in 1913. It is held in the Museum Ludwig, in Cologne.

== History and description ==
This was one of the first paintings created by Macke, after he moved to Hilterfingen, in Switzerland. In this work, as in many paintings of his late period, there can be noticed the influence of Robert Delaunay, but without rejection of figurativeness.

The theme of the painting is a walk in the park. Macke had developed this favorite motive since the beginning of his career. The artist creates around the characters a world in which the people seem to match their stylized environment: the ladies appear in elegant tight dresses and fashionable hats while men wear dark suits and bowler hats. Macke himself described the protagonists of his paintings: "The generally accepted attribute of men is bowler hats, and I put bowlers on them. Women with slender necks and hips hold umbrellas in their hands to protect them from light." Individuality is excluded, the faces are shown schematically, and clothes are of a uniform cut, further enhancing the anonymity of the characters.

In the center of the composition is a woman in a green jacket whose figure, presented half-turned, divides the canvas into two vertical parts. In the middle ground, under the canopy of tree crowns, two couples are walking. Two of them, a man and a woman, leaning on the parapet, are watching the river flow. The branches of the trees extend from each other almost at right angles; their drawing was borrowed by Macke from the A Treatise on Painting, compiled from the theoretical works of Leonardo da Vinci. Macke studied the book at his stay in Berlin in 1907–1908, during his studies with fellow painter Lovis Corinth. The houses on both banks of the river are conceived in simplified forms, and the mountains in the distance are represented in the form of triangles. This reduction of familiar objects to simple geometric shapes was characteristic of early Cubism, including the work of Delaunay.

The artist seems to have stopped the passage of time, and the impression of peace is enhanced by the "warm autumn colors" (Magdalena Moeller) of the painting. Their radiance is enhanced by working on the contrast of complementary colors. Illuminated evenly from all sides, the figures of people seem to merge with the surrounding world.

== See also ==
- List of works by August Macke
