= Promenade (Macke) =

Painting by August Macke

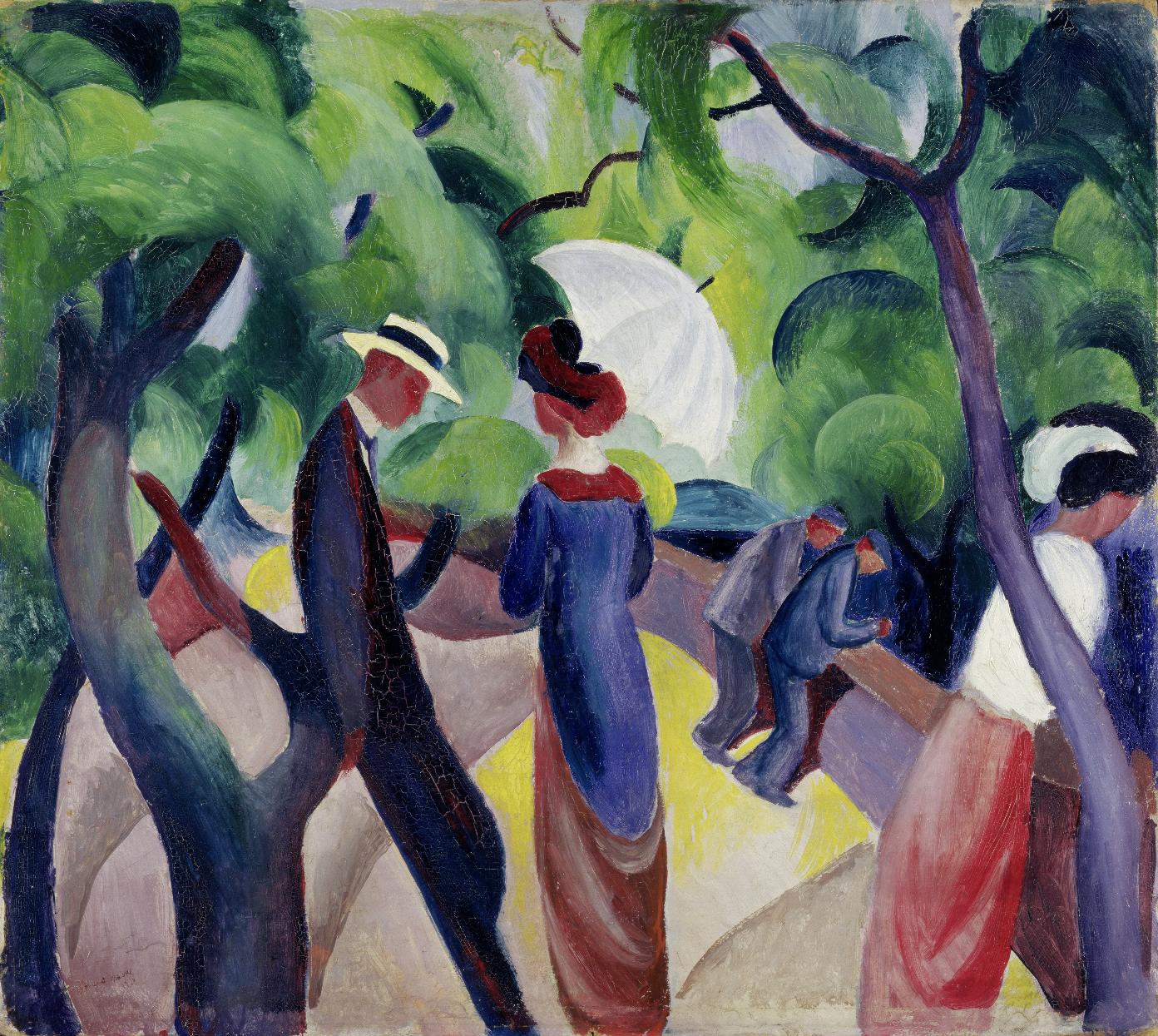
- Artist: August Macke
- Year: 1913
- Medium: Oil on cardboard
- Dimensions: 51 cm × 57 cm (20 in × 22 in)
- Location: Städtische Galerie im Lenbachhaus; Munich

Promenade is an oil-on-cardboard painting by the German artist August Macke, executed in 1913. It is held at the Städtische Galerie im Lenbachhaus in Munich. Chronologically, it is the first of the paintings that he created after moving to Hilterfingen, in Switzerland.

== History ==
In the autumn of 1913, Macke, together with his wife and son, moved to Switzerland, settling in Hilterfingen, on Lake Thun, where he would spend eight months, from September 1913 to May 1914, working intensively. The Promenade painting is the first created during this period, and the first where Macke used the motif of a walk in a park near a bridge and water. Decisive for Macke was the influence of the contemporary French painting, above all the work of Robert Delaunay. For Macke, this event was a turning point in understanding the role of light and color in painting. According to his wife, Elisabeth Erdmann-Macke, in his final paintings there can be noticed the "airiness of colors, wonderful luminosity, especially in the green tones of trees, transparency of heavenly blue, sunspots on the ground, where shades change from shining yellow to deep red-brown". He painted figures of people devoided of sharp contrasts, and without outlining them with a clearly defined contour.

Back in 1910, Macke had defined the goal of his work: "to praise nature." In Hilterfingen, the old motives of his paintings and sketches took a more intense level. Macke created what could be considered the "Paradise" of the modern man, with leisurely walks through the city streets, serene relaxation in the park, sailing and swimming.

== Description ==
In the center of the composition is a young man, dressed in an elegant suit and with a summer hat, talking to a lady in a red dress and blue jacket, holding an umbrella. The couple seems fenced off from the environment, not noticing anything around. Their faces are only outlined, anonymized, and devoid of specific features. Another lady, wearing a hat with a white feather, is leaning against the railing of the bridge, and the same do other two men, to her left. The painting creates a feeling of blissful peace on a quiet, sunny day, where a person seems in harmony both with himself and with nature.

== See also ==
- List of works by August Macke
