= Girls in Green =

Painting by August Macke

- Mädchen im Grünen (German)
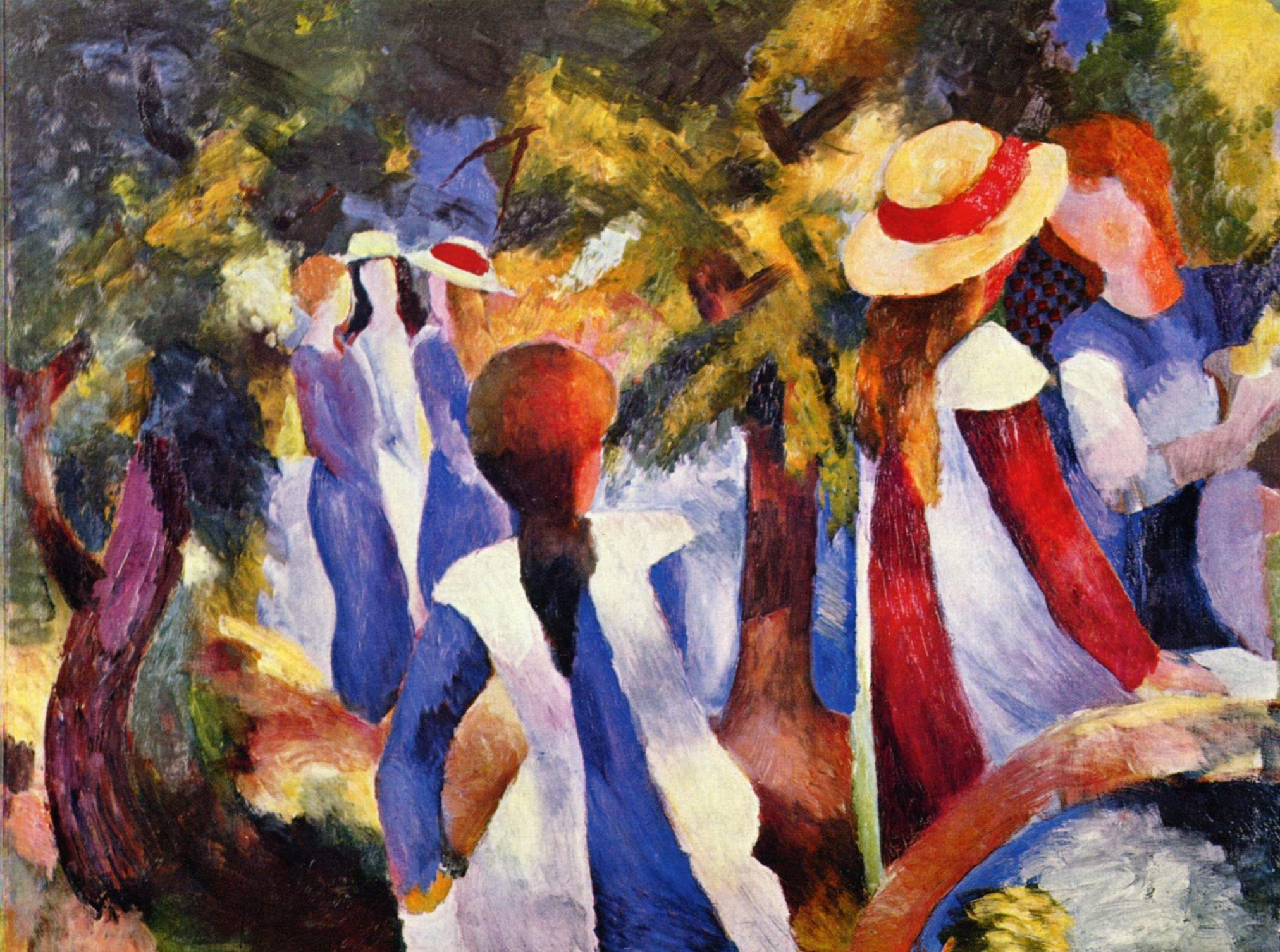
- Artist: August Macke
- Year: 1914
- Medium: Oil on canvas
- Dimensions: 119.5 cm × 145 cm (47.0 in × 57 in)
- Location: Pinakothek der Moderne; Munich

Girls in Green, also known as Girls under Trees, is an oil-on-canvas painting by the German painter August Macke, executed in 1914. It depicts a number of girls among the trees on the edge of a lake, where the color areas of the figures and the environment seem to merge. The painting is in the collection of the Pinakothek der Moderne in Munich.

== History ==
Macke was a member of the Expressionist group Der Blaue Reiter, but unlike his colleagues Wassily Kandinsky and Franz Marc, he had little involvement in theoretical discussions. In essence he was mainly a colourist and he always looked for warmth and rhythm in his works. In doing so, he was influenced by the Orphistic ideas of Robert Delaunay about color relationships and the fragmentation and interpretation of shapes based on light and color.

In November 1913 Macke moved with his wife Elisabeth to Hilterfingen, on Lake Thun, in Switzerland. He started working on his largest painting, Mädchen im Grünen, before going on a tour of Tunisia with Paul Klee in April 1914, confirming that the style of his later works had already been formed before that trip. Macke was killed at the start of World War I, in September 1914, at the front in France.

== Description ==
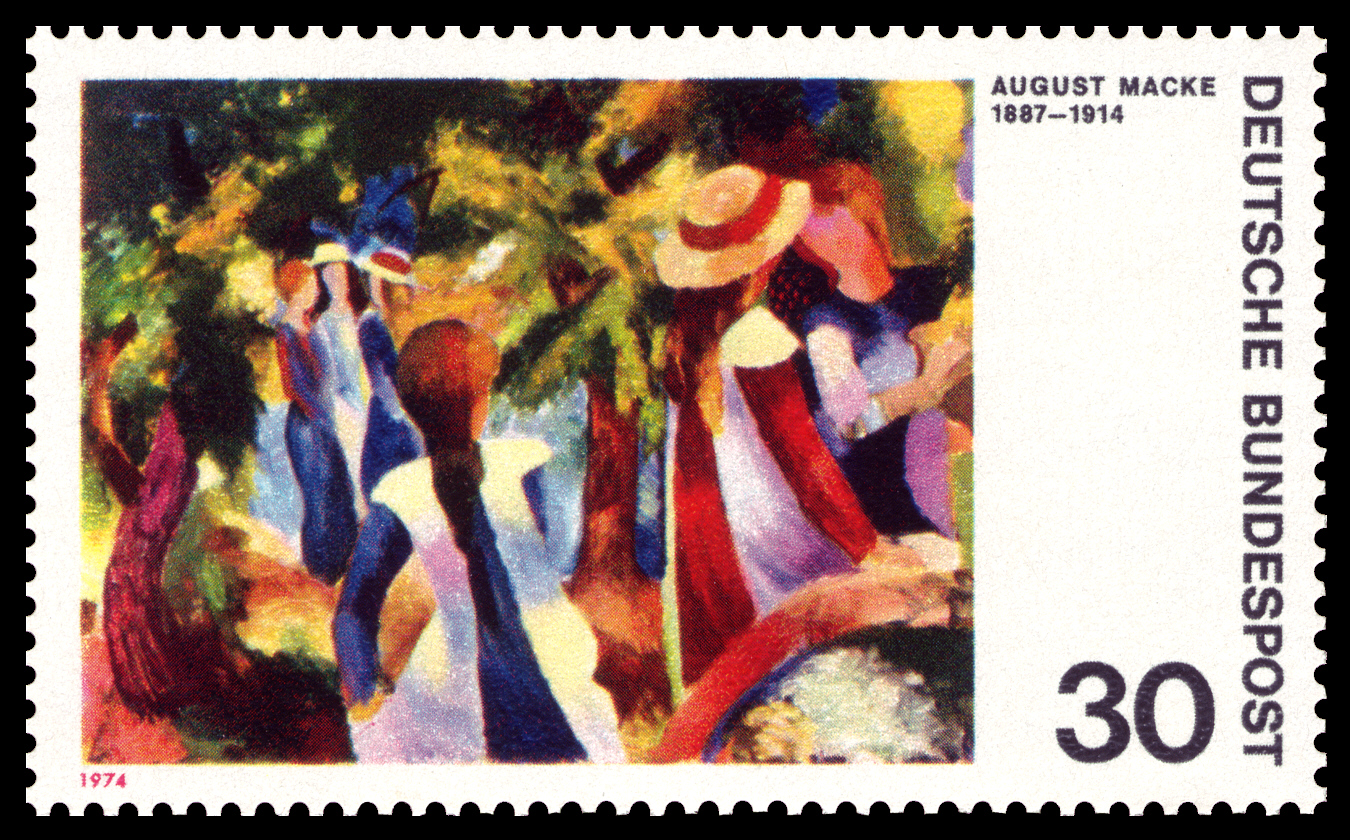
Girls in Green in a West Germany stamp (1974)

The painting shows a number of girls playing among the trees on the edge of Lake Thun. A group placed closer together in the background corresponds to the girls in the foreground, depicted in front, back and side views. Macke emphasizes the perspective and dynamic structure by displaying the three figures cut off by the frame slightly obliquely and placing them one behind the other in depth.

However, the figurative aspect is clearly subordinate to the fleeting play of light and shadow and the constant change in tonality. The image of the girls completely blends with the environment. Man and nature are intertwined by the formal treatment and the loose brushwork that structures all the elements in the same way. Color dissolves all objects in a picturesque balance. The blue of the lake is continued in the girls' dresses. In their clothes, the cool blue contrasts with warm reds, yellows and browns, giving the composition a certain tension. Everything shows a well-considered structure. The various patches of color, including the white dresses, are carefully arranged. What counts is the overall impression of harmony between man and nature. This is reinforced by a suggestion of movement created by the segmented design. The pattern of the spots and the rhythm in the surfaces tends strongly towards abstraction.

== Honors ==
Girls in Green was the subject of a West Germany 30 cent postage stamp in 1974.

== See also ==
- List of works by August Macke
