= Indians on Horseback =

Painting by August Macke

- Indianer auf Pferden (German)
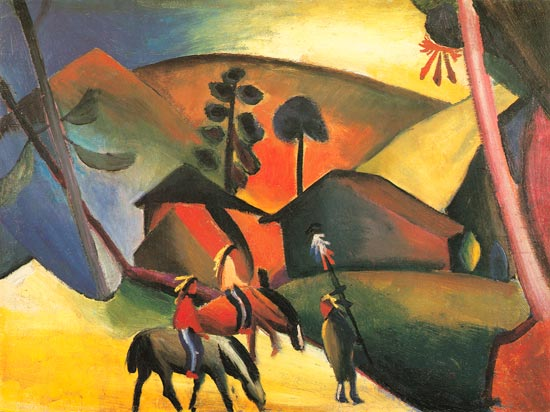
- Artist: August Macke
- Year: 1911
- Medium: Oil on canvas
- Dimensions: 44 cm × 60 cm (17 in × 24 in)
- Location: Städtische Galerie im Lenbachhaus; Munich

Indians on Horseback is an oil-on-canvas painting executed in 1911 by the German Expressionist painter August Macke. It was created when the artist was under the influence of Cubism and had joined Der Blaue Reiter group through his friend Franz Marc. The painting belongs to the collection of the Städtische Galerie im Lenbachhaus, in Munich. It was donated by the Bernhard and Elly Koehler Foundation in 1965.

== Description ==
The paintings landscape shows three people and two horses. In the background, there are sharp, round mountains with a dark yellow sky, in front of which there are huts. The figures are "Indians" as Macke imagined them to be. Two are mounted on horses, and the third is holding a spear adorned with blue, white and red feathers. The outlines are painted sharply, but the colors run in the flat areas, as is typical of Macke's painting. Some things are reminiscent of Franz Marc's influence, such as the dark and shiny fantasy landscape, the formula-shaped surfaces and the trees leaning to the left. But Macke also used Cubist influences here for the first time, albeit in a "moderate way." According to art historian Johannes Langner, there is also the "schematic plastic form" characteristic of Cubism and "a wave of energies that pushes to the left", recognizable by the diagonal elements of the composition. Macke's conception of Cubism was softer and more pictorial than that of his colleagues; in contrast to Marc's images, it is more reminiscent of Fauvism style, represented by the Neue Künstlervereinigung München painters until about 1910. The motif of Macke's painting, the "noble savage", is also related to Cubism. It is the craving for paradise that has been in the consciousness of European avant-gardes since Paul Gauguin and who had the desire to break with European artistic traditions and deal with the exotic. Art historian Rosel Gollek quotes August Macke as saying that painting is "a joy in nature" for him. While his fellow Blaue Reiter artists had "an intellectual claim difficult to convey", Macke had the "magic of a humorous, fairy tale, mythical sound filled with poetry".

== See also ==
- List of works by August Macke
