= Woman with Umbrella in Front of a Hat Shop =

Painting by August Macke

- Frau mit Sonnenschirm vor einem Hutladen (German)
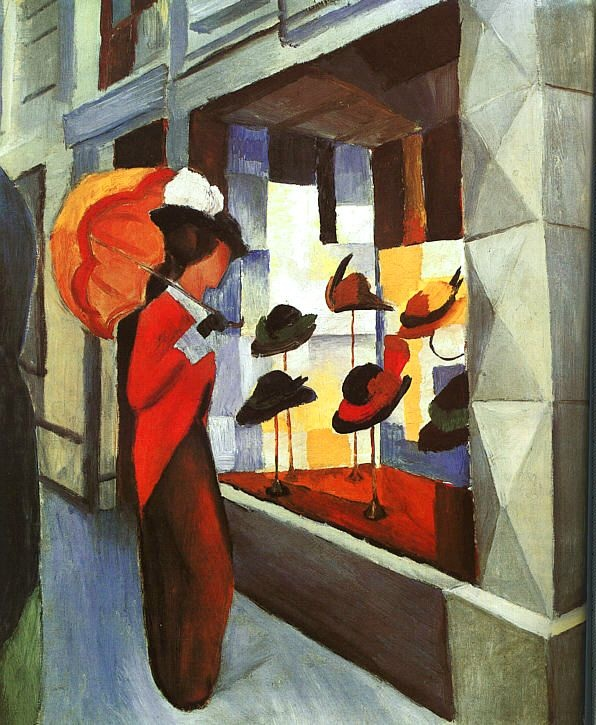
- Artist: August Macke
- Year: 1914
- Medium: Oil on canvas
- Dimensions: 60.5 cm × 50.5 cm (23.8 in × 19.9 in)
- Location: Museum Folkwang; Essen

Woman with Umbrella in Front of a Hat Shop is an oil-on-canvas painting executed in 1914 by the German painter August Macke. It depicts a woman peeking into a hat shop, painted in an Expressionist style. The painting is in the collection of the Museum Folkwang in Essen.

== History ==
Macke moved with his wife Elisabeth to Hilterfingen, on the Lake Thun, in Switzerland, in November 1913, where his mother-in-law had a house. The small, orderly bourgeois town inspired him to create a series of quiet, subdued compositions. In particular, he became particularly interested by hat shop windows, which he would frequently make the theme of his paintings. Clearly visible in these works is a focus on subjects from everyday life and the passing moment, as was also known from the Impressionists. Although the formalizing abstraction creates a certain detachment, his works from this period, which came to a close in April 1914, nevertheless radiate a striking positivity.

== Description ==
This is regarded as the most mature of Macke's shop window paintings. It arose immediately after Zwei Frauen vor dem Hutladen and also builds on it. Theme and atmosphere are similar, typically urban, but anything but loud and hectic. The female figure, dressed in an elegant suit, wearing a hat with a white bouquet on her head and an umbrella over her shoulder, could have been taken right out of that earlier work. The lady has no face and remains anonymous, as if she were a fashion doll.

Compositionally, Macke has arranged the image space along clear diagonal perspective lines. The plane-disintegrating geometric shape of the stone facade with the carved pilasters and the shop window, as well as the abstracted figure, fit into the structure of the painting like mosaic stones and form an integrated unit. This also applies to the use of color, with deliberately chosen accents around the middle. The woman's clothing, predominantly warm reds and yellows, corresponds to the hats in the shop window on stands, which are decorated with ribbons and feathers. The light breaks in the window. Reflections mix both inside and outside with the spaces and surfaces. The transparent surfaces in the shop window are echoed in the rustic pilaster on the side.

The attraction of the work lies mainly in the clear and firm power of the composition and the radiant expressive power of the contrasting colours. The atmospheric figurative description of the situation is naturally mixed with a cool abstract effect, giving the painting a special classical-modern tension.

Woman with Umbrella in Front of a Hat Shop was purchased in 1920 by the Museum Folkwang, in Essen, then called Essener Kunstmuseum. In 1937 it was confiscated by the Nazis as degenerate art, but in 1953 the work was bought back by the museum, with the support of the city of Essen. It is now regarded as one of its top works in the collection of modern German art.

== See also ==
- List of works by August Macke
- 100 Great Paintings, 1980 BBC series
