= Donkey Rider =

Painting by August Macke

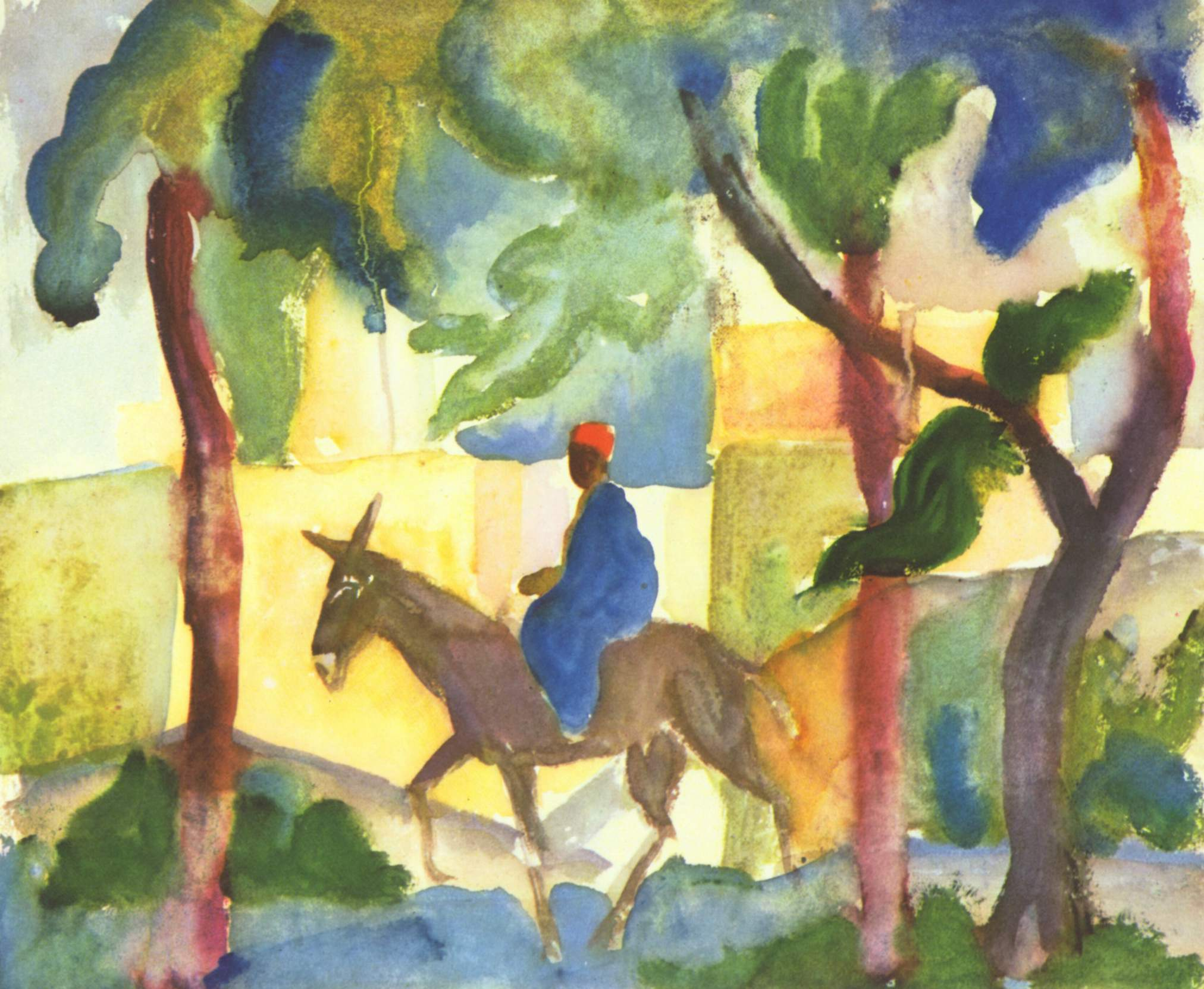
- Artist: August Macke
- Year: 1914
- Medium: Watercolor
- Dimensions: 24 cm × 28.5 cm (9.4 in × 11.2 in)
- Location: August-Macke-Haus; Bonn

The Donkey Rider is a watercolor created in 1914 by the German Expressionist painter August Macke. It was created during the art-historically significant trip to Tunisia that he took with fellow painters Paul Klee and Louis Moilliet in April 1914. The watercolor is in a private collection.

== History and description ==
The sunlight in the cities of Tunis, Hammamet, Kairouan and their surroundings inspired the three painter friends to produce colorful works. No oil paintings were made there, but many sketches, photos and, above all, watercolors. August Macke, like his colleague Franz Marc, had always drawn animals, in the zoo or in nature. A donkey appears in several of the paintings that were created on this trip. Macke himself risked a donkey ride under the guidance of a local. In his photo album there is a photograph that shows a donkey rider in motion, which probably served as a template for the watercolor. Paul Klee and August Macke painted watercolors in the house of the Swiss physician Dr. Jaeggi, who removed the walls of a room to create a studio. While Klee was painting the figures of two Arabs, a man and a woman, Macke made sketches of orange baskets and of a black donkey and of people with red fetters in the background.

The watercolor shows a dark-skinned rider in a blue robe with a red cap, in front of the almost abstract fortress wall of Tunis, consisting of square surfaces in the flat background that takes the depth of the painting. Macke also placed flat trees and bushes in the foreground. The picture has no perspective and, in the opinion of the art historian Ernst-Gerhard Güse, deals with Paul Klee's world of forms, which is shown in the "geometrical forms of the city wall". Klee had integrated the cubic architecture of Arab cities into his painting. There are two levels of representation in this watercolor, which only correspond through their color, the wall and the figurative representation of the rider with the donkey. There was no preliminary drawing on the watercolor paper, apparently Macke created the painting based on a photo and adjusted the composition.

Even before the trip, Macke had experimented with abstract forms, inspired by the work of Wassily Kandinsky and Robert Delaunay, but without completely ignoring the figurative and representational. With his pictorial means of creation, it was important for him to use the color freely. On April 10, 1914, he wrote to his wife that he felt a great joy in work, as he had never known before, and that he got excited with the thousands of motifs he had found in the African landscape, which he considered "even more beautiful" than Provence. The quick painting of his watercolors was an expression of this found joy in work, and the quick movement of the brush can be seen in each of these sheets.

Macke understood the watercolors that he created on the Tunis trip as travel impressions, memorabilia and studies, from which he later wanted to make paintings. But he never achieved his purpose, since he was killed in action few months later at the beginning of the First World War.

== See also ==
- List of works by August Macke
