= People on the Blue Lake =

Painting by August Macke

- Leute am blauen See (German)
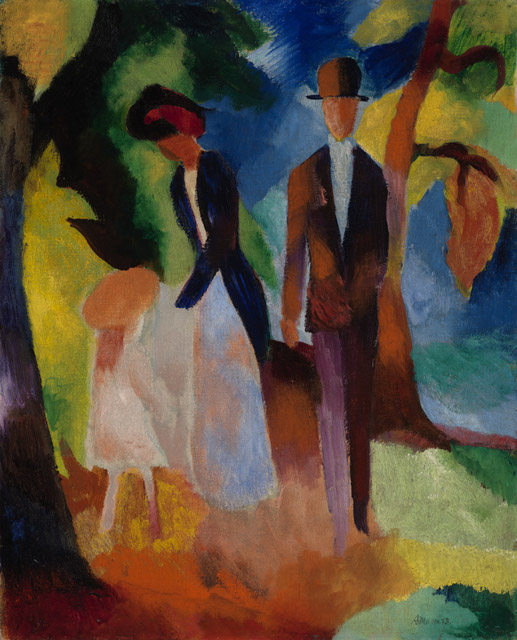
- Artist: August Macke
- Year: 1913
- Medium: Oil on canvas
- Dimensions: 60 cm × 48.5 cm (24 in × 19.1 in)
- Location: Staatliche Kunsthalle Karlsruhe; Karlsruhe

People on the Blue Lake is an oil-on-canvas painting executed in 1913 by the German artist August Macke. It is held in the Staatliche Kunsthalle Karlsruhe in Karlsruhe.

== History and description ==
This painting was probably started and finished in Hilterfingen. The painting depicts, from right to left, three people, a man and a woman, presumably a couple, with the woman talking to her daughter. Behind the man, a tree is seen, while another one is partially seen at the right. In this work, Macke expands the boundaries of the influence of impressionism and fauvism on his own work, going in his quest further, seeking the highest expression of his understanding of the meaning of color in painting. The main colors of the painting are those obtained during the decomposition of white light: red, orange, yellow, green, blue and violet. Freely, without sharp boundaries, they pass one into another, uniting in a kind of color circle with twelve sectors. Macke embodies in the painting, which shows the mutual influence of one color on another, their harmonious and disharmonious combinations, the laws of the color circle.

Considering color combinations, the viewer gradually comprehends the whole composition. As Macke said: "The peculiarity of the painting is both simultaneous and sequential. Each new sequence in the painting shows: the eye wanders". According to his wife Elizabeth Macke, August at that time was fascinated by the task of conveying dynamics in painting and its solution not through perspective construction, but through the use of the "play of shades" - this should happen even within the framework of one color, for example, green: "without a single red spot, the color should work, vibrate, live." Macke strove to achieve harmony and generalization through the coordination of pure colors among themselves. In his later paintings, the main principle was the liveliness of the integral perception of the work by the viewer, which was the result of only the mutual influence of colors, and not perspective or cut-off modeling.

== See also ==
- List of works by August Macke
