= Pinakothek der Moderne =

Art museum in Munich, Germany

Coordinates: 48°08′49″N 11°34′20″E

- Pinakothek der Moderne
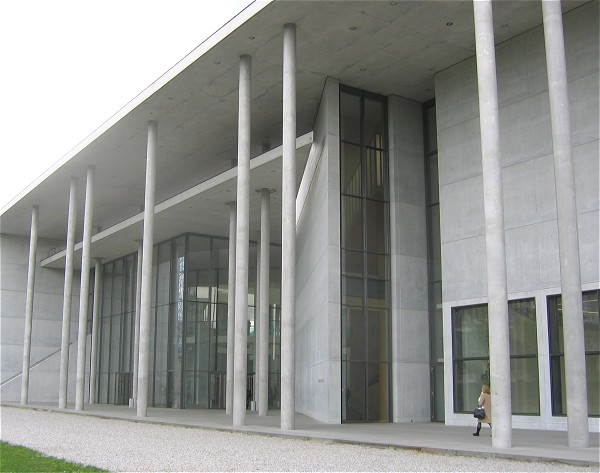
- Pinakothek der Moderne, exterior
- Established: September 2002
- Location: Munich, Germany
- Type: Modern art museum
- Collection size: Art, Architecture, Design, Works on Paper
- Architect: Stephan Braunfels
- Website: Official website

The Pinakothek der Moderne (German: [pinakoˈteːk deːɐ̯ moˈdɛʁnə], Pinakothek of the Modern) is a modern art museum, situated in central Munich's Kunstareal.

== The building ==
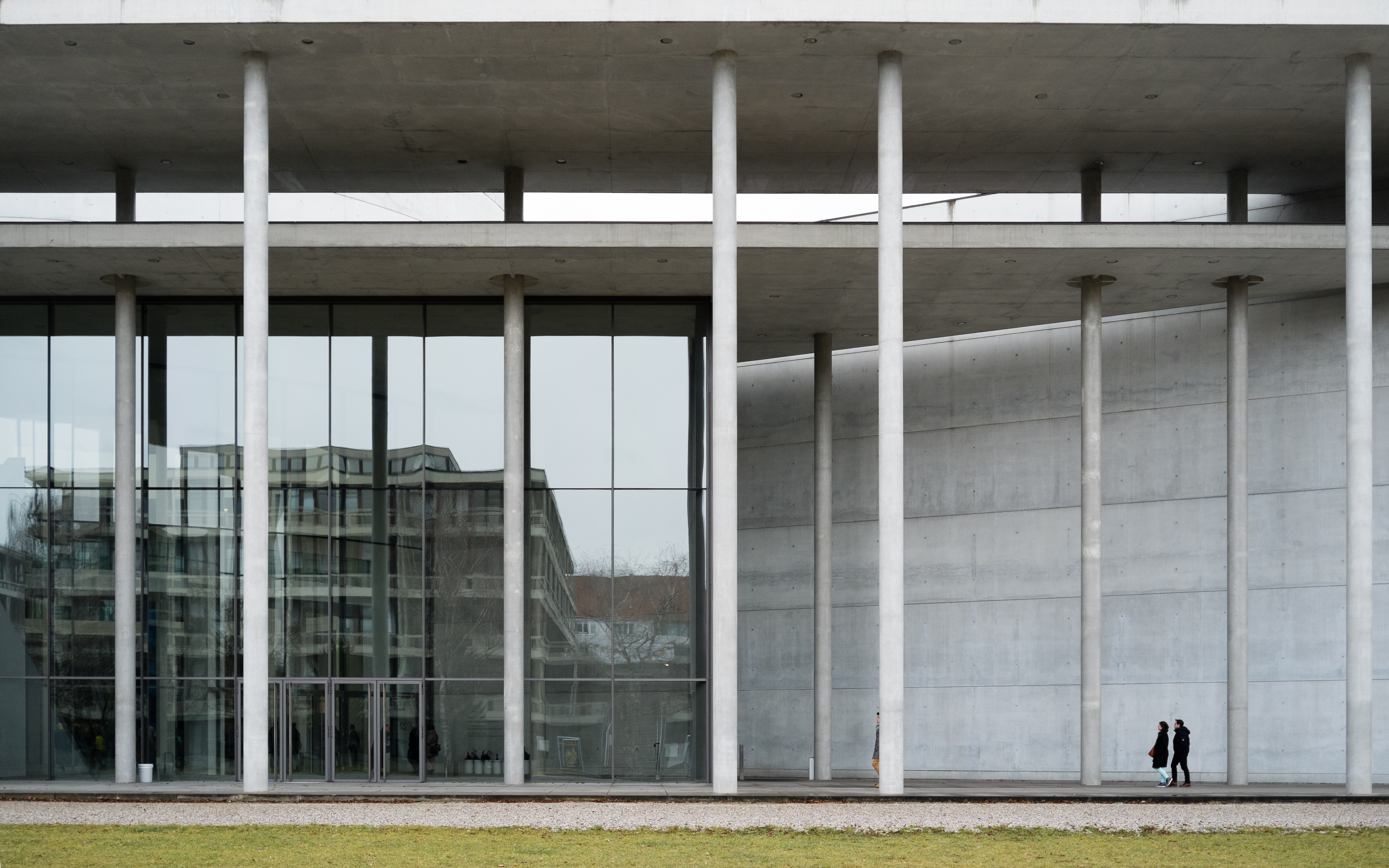
Entrance area with size comparison

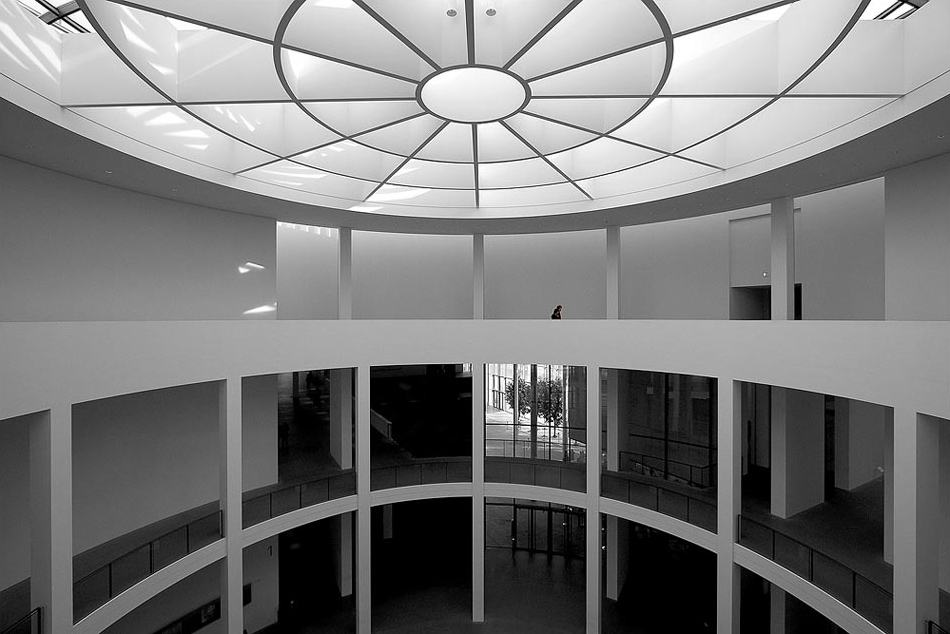
Pinakothek der Moderne, rotunda

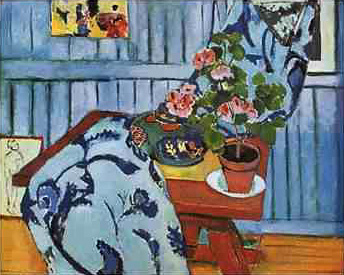
Henri Matisse Still Life with Geraniums 1910 (first painting of Matisse acquired by a public collection)

Designed by German architect Stephan Braunfels, the Pinakothek der Moderne was inaugurated in September 2002 after seven years of construction. The $120 million, 22,000-square-meter building took a decade to finish because of bureaucratic objections to design and cost, which were ultimately bridged by private initiative and financing. The rectilinear facade, dominated by white and grey concrete, is interrupted by large windows and high rise columns, the latter supporting the extensive canopied roof. Each of the four corners of the building, connected by a central domed rotunda, is dedicated to a special collection. The Museum is thus divided into Art (Kunst), Architecture (Architektur), Design (Design) and Works on Paper (Graphik).

The first floor, containing the art collection, has ample natural light from above, augmented by computer-controlled lamps, designed to keep a consistent, nearly shadowless illumination against the gray floors and white walls.

== Collections ==
Before the opening of the Pinakothek der Moderne, art of the 20th century was largely relegated to the Haus der Kunst, or occasional contemporary exhibits in the Lenbachhaus.

Today, the Pinakothek unifies the "Sammlung Moderne Kunst" (National Collection of Modern and Contemporary Arts, which is under supervision of the Bavarian State Painting Collections), the "Staatliche Graphische Sammlung" (National Collection of Works on Paper), the "Neue Sammlung" ('New Collection': National Museum for Design and Applied Arts) with the "Architekturmuseum der Technischen Universität" (Munich Technical University's Museum of Architecture), in one building and is deemed one of the most important and popular museums of modern art in Europe. The Danner Foundation opened in 2004 a new permanent exhibition area in the basement for the permanent loans from the Danner Jewelry Collection which presents contemporary works from over one hundred international goldsmiths.

=== Collection of Modern Art ===
Since 1945 the collection, previously exhibited in the Haus der Kunst, has grown quickly by purchase, as well as donations by individuals and several foundations. Various art movements of the 20th century are represented in the collection, including Expressionism, Fauvism, Cubism, New Objectivity, Bauhaus, Surrealism, Abstract Expressionism, Pop Art and Minimal Art.

In addition to a focused collection policy to individual priorities, the portfolio was extended in particular through the collections: "Theo Wormland", "Sophie and Emanuel Fohn", "Woty and Theodor Werner", "Martha and Mark Kruss", "Günther Franke", "Klaus Gebhard", and the collection of Franz, Duke of Bavaria with contemporary German painters such as Jörg Immendorff and Sigmar Polke. Recent enrichment in the year 2006, the collection "Eleanor and Michael Stoffel".

- Modernism since the 1900s

The first floor of the west wing displays works of Georges Braque, Fernand Léger, Juan Gris, Umberto Boccioni, Robert Delaunay, Joan Miró and René Magritte as well as Lyonel Feininger, Oskar Kokoschka, László Moholy-Nagy, Otto Dix, Max Ernst, Giorgio de Chirico, Salvador Dalí and Francis Bacon. Very comprehensive are the collected works of Pablo Picasso and Max Beckmann.

The museum also displays masterpieces of German Expressionism: representing painters of two early 20th-century German artist groups, Die Brücke (Bridge) and Der Blaue Reiter (The blue rider), whose members included, among others, Ernst Ludwig Kirchner, Erich Heckel, Karl Schmidt-Rottluff, Emil Nolde and Franz Marc, August Macke, Paul Klee, Alexej von Jawlensky and Wassily Kandinsky.

- Contemporary Art since the 1960s

The museum also gives very profound insights into international contemporary art. In the first floor of the east wing the gallery displays works of Lucio Fontana, Alberto Burri, Jannis Kounellis, Andy Warhol, Jasper Johns, Robert Rauschenberg, Robert Motherwell, Franz Kline, Antoni Tàpies, Cy Twombly, Willem de Kooning, George Segal, Richard Serra, Dan Flavin, Donald Judd, Fred Sandback, Joseph Beuys, Blinky Palermo, Henry Moore, Marino Marini, Per Kirkeby, Georg Baselitz, Gerhard Richter, Sigmar Polke, Nam June Paik, Wolf Vostell, Bruce Nauman, Marlene Dumas, Günther Förg, Jörg Immendorff, Mike Kelley, Martin Kippenberger, David Salle, Rosemarie Trockel, David Hockney, Hermann Nitsch and many others.

- Video, Photos and New Media

The Pinakothek houses works of artists like John Baldessari (Man running/Men carrying box, 1988–1990), Teresa Hubbard / Alexander Birchler (Eight), 2000), Bruce Nauman (World Peace (projected), 1996), Pipilotti Rist (Himalaya Goldsteins Stube, 1998/1999), Hiroshi Sugimoto (World Trade Center, Minoru Yamazaki, 1997), Bill Viola (Tiny Death, 1993), Sam Taylor-Wood (Soliloquy III, 1998) and Jeff Wall with his back-lit boxes (Eviction Struggle, 1988; A villager from Aricaköyu arriving in Mahmutbey, Istanbul September 1997).

=== Collection of design ===
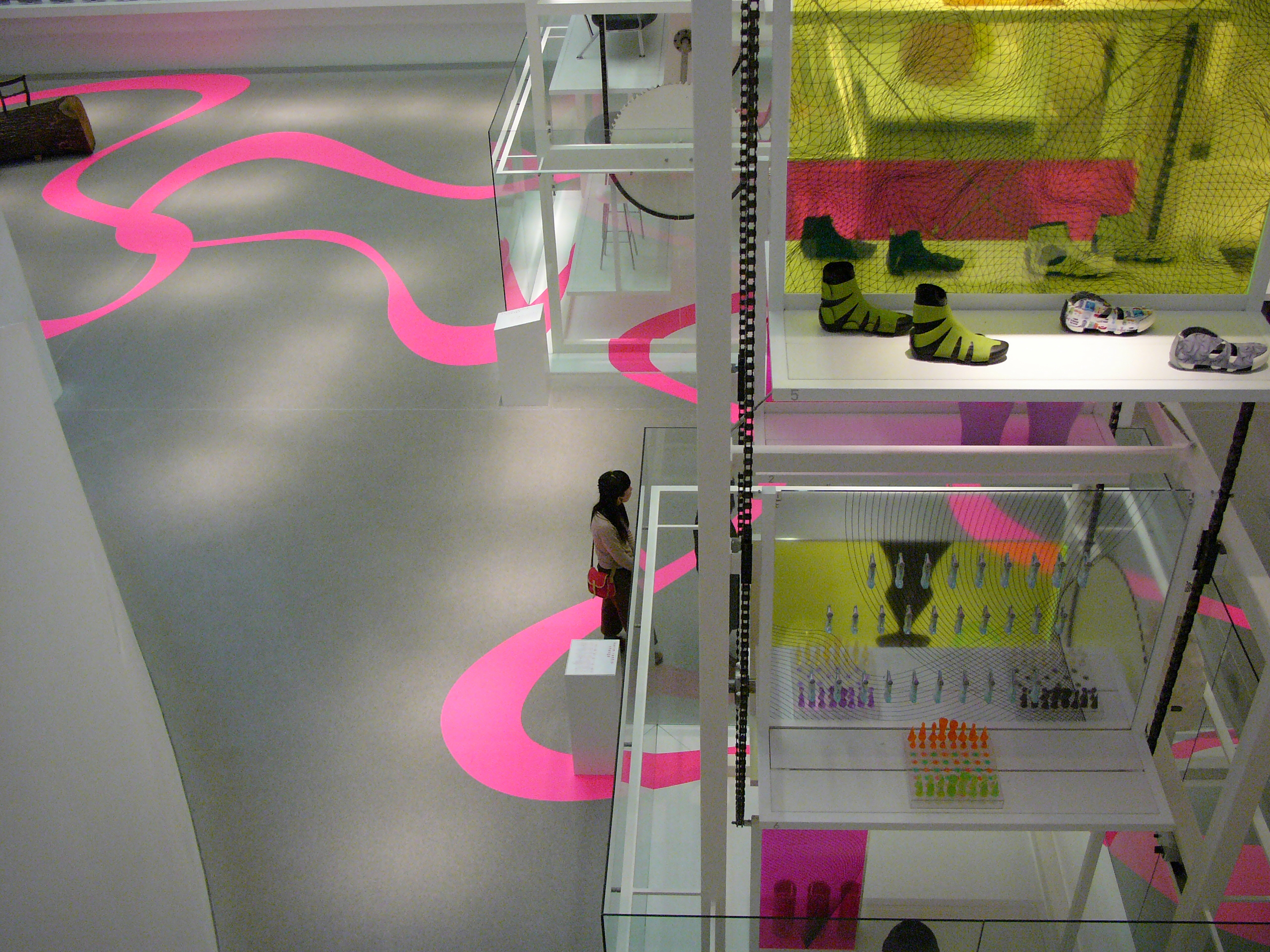
Design at Pinakothek der Moderne

The Collection of applied modernist art was founded in 1925. With around 70.000 objects of industrial design, graphic design and the arts and crafts the "Neue Sammlung" is today one of the world's leading museums of 20th century applied art, and indeed the largest of industrial design. Parts of the expanded collection are exhibited in the basement of the Pinakothek der Moderne. Among others objects about motor vehicle design, computer culture, design of artistic jewelry and furnitures (e.g. the collection of chairs of Michael Thonet) are exhibited.

=== Collection of works on paper ===
The Bavarian State collection of work on paper has its origin in the Wittelsbach collections, especially in the print room collection of Charles Theodore, Elector of Bavaria. The ground floor shows alternating exhibitions of one of the most important collection of works on paper in Germany, with old German, Dutch and Italian drawings (including masterpieces by Albrecht Dürer, Rembrandt, Michelangelo and Leonardo da Vinci) and German and international drawings of the 19th–21st centuries, e.g. by Paul Cézanne, Henri Matisse, Paul Klee and David Hockney.

=== Museum for architecture ===
The museum of the Technical University of Munich started with a donation of King Ludwig II of Bavaria for the newly founded university in 1868 and is today the largest one in Germany. The museum shows altering exhibitions in the ground floor. The collection shows especially drawings, blueprints, photographs, models and computer animations about the work of notable architects like François de Cuvilliés, Balthasar Neumann, Gottfried Semper, Le Corbusier, and Günther Behnisch.

== Gallery ==
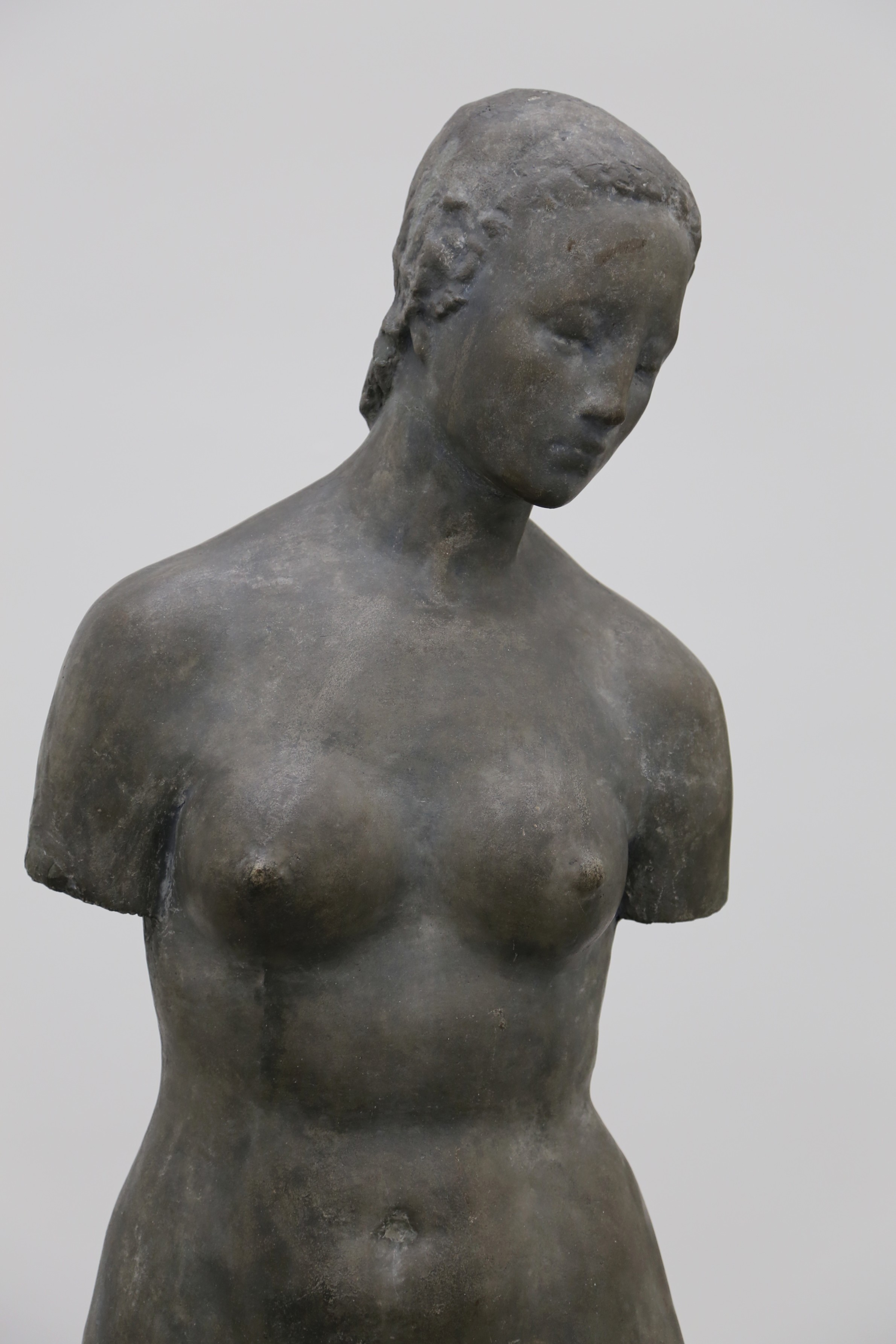
Wilhelm Lehmbruck, Female Torso, 1910

Pablo Picasso, La Femme au Violon, 1911

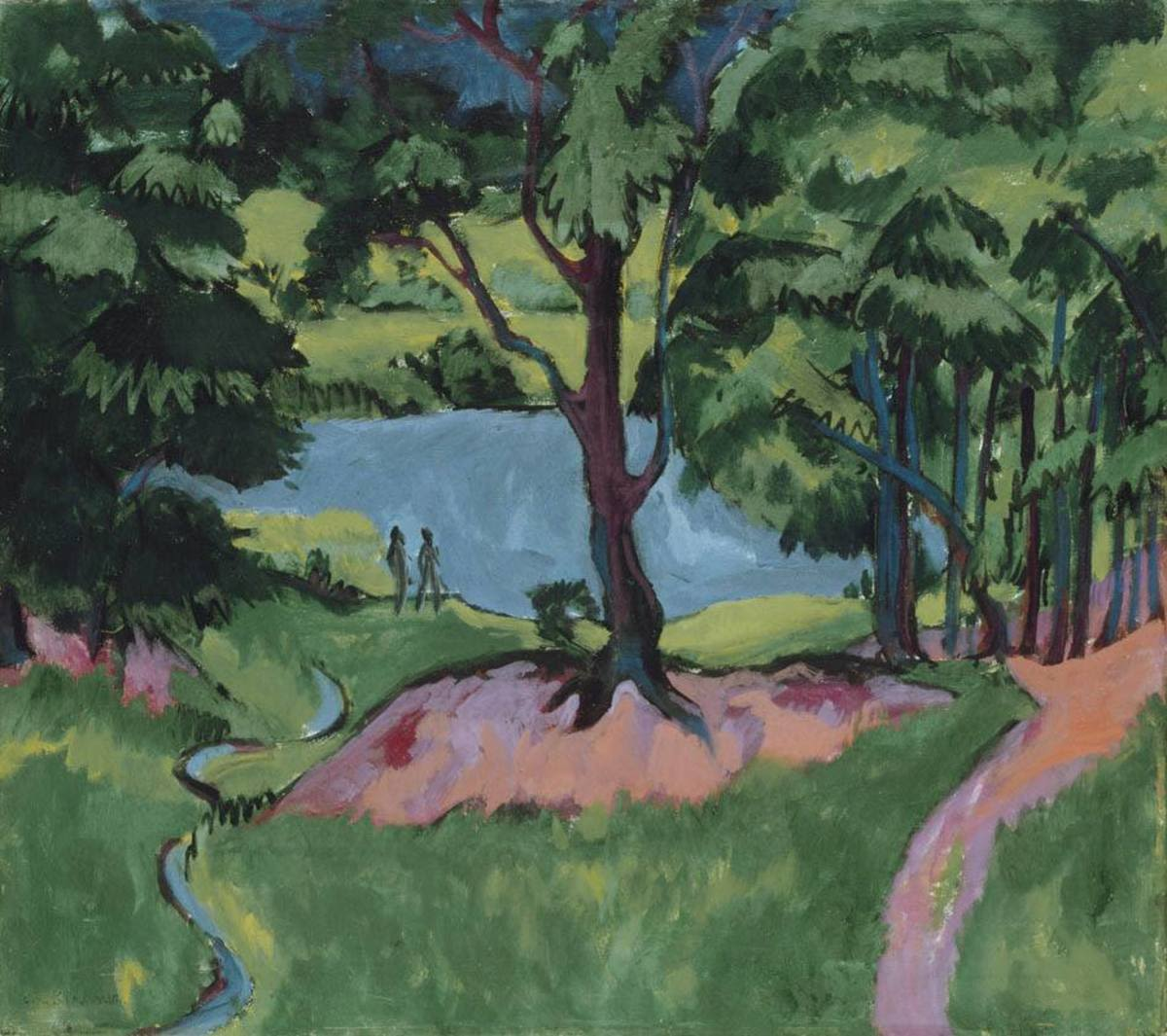
Ernst Ludwig Kirchner, Bohemian Lake, 1911

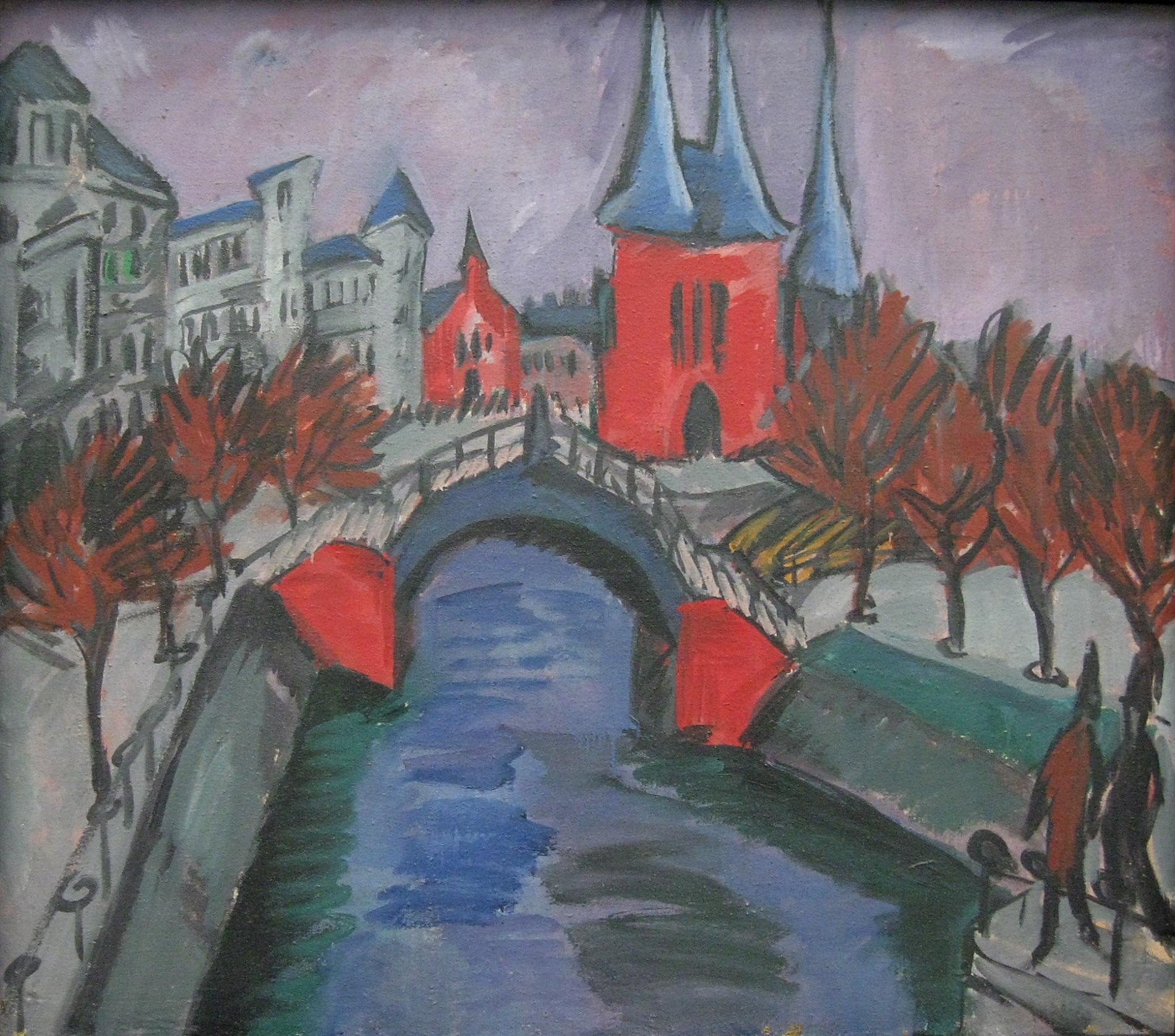
Ernst Ludwig Kirchner, Elisabethufer, 1913

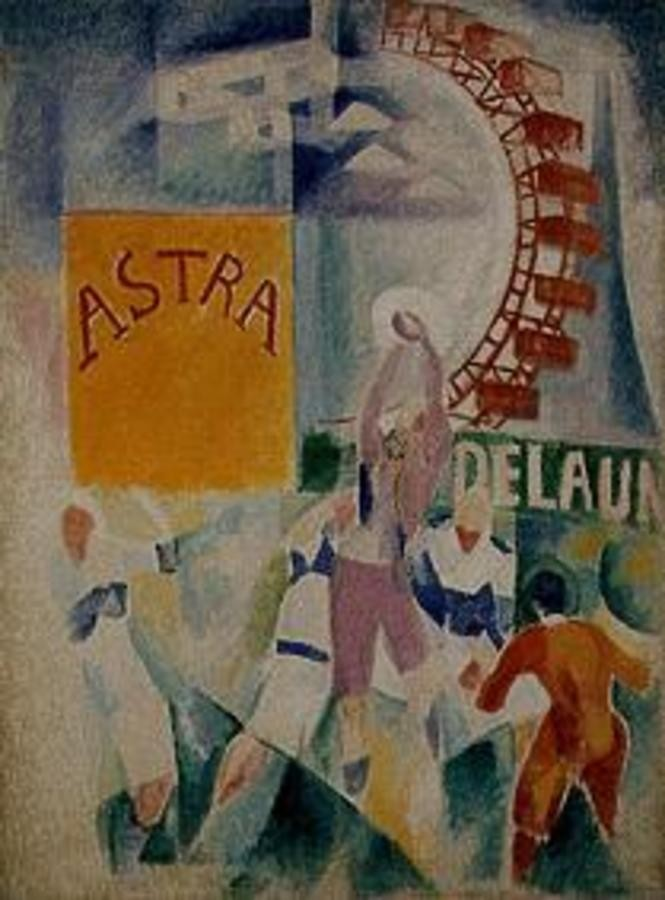
Robert Delaunay, L'Équipe de Cardiff, 1913

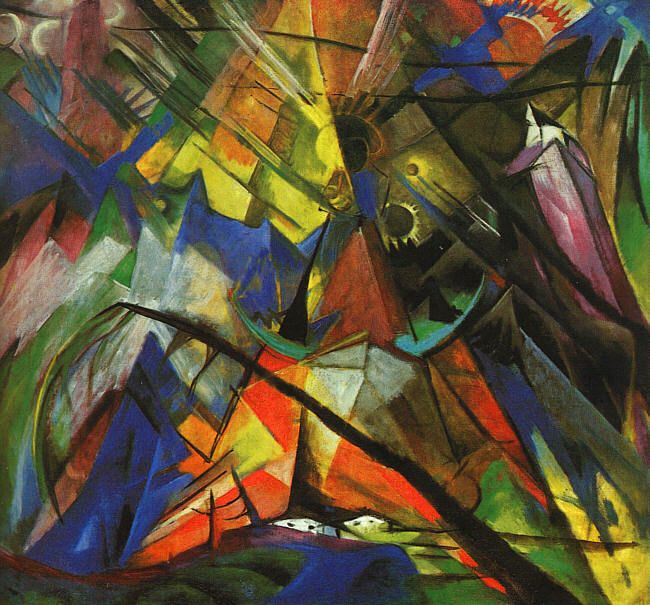
Franz Marc, Tyrol, 1914

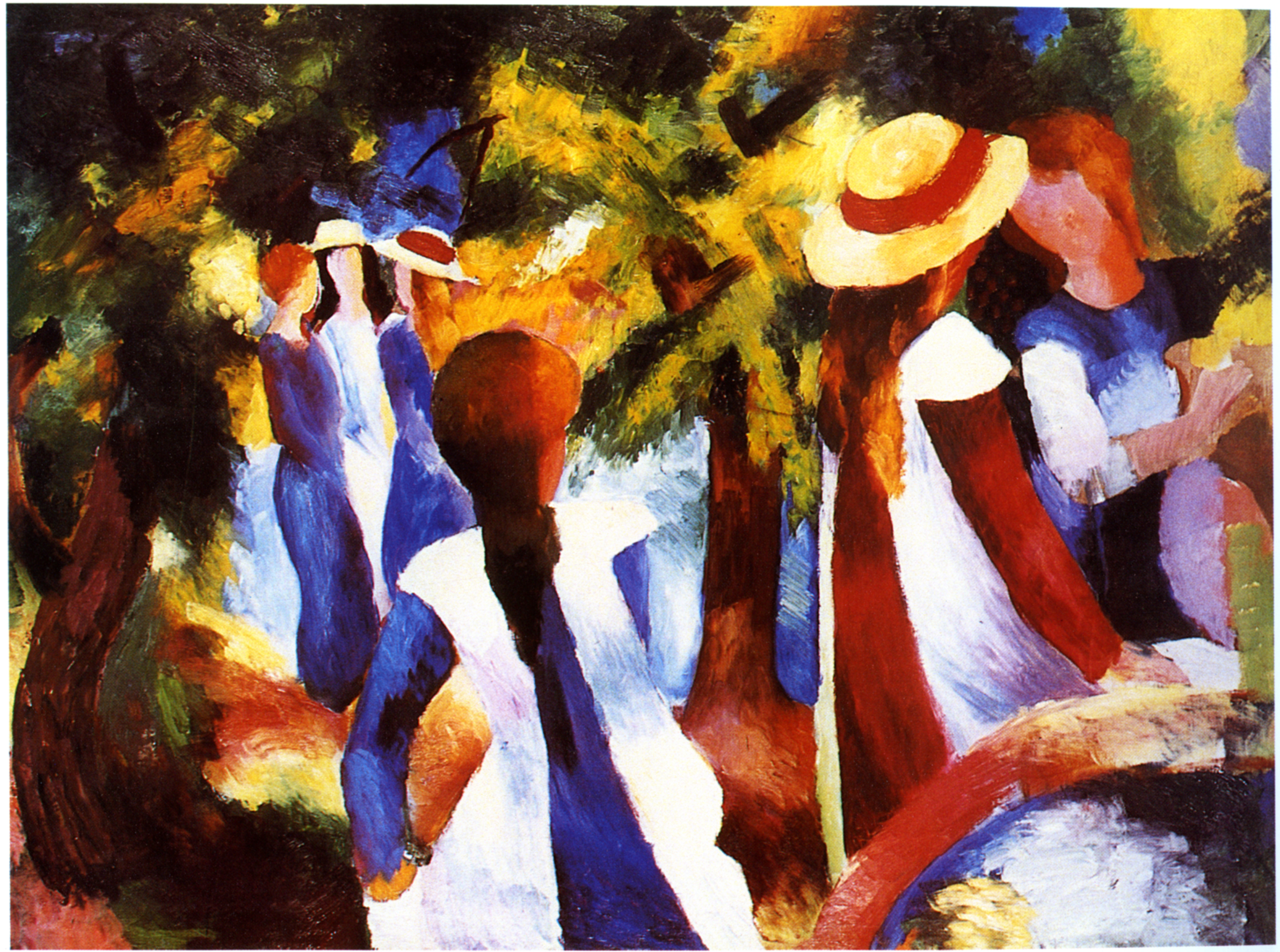
August Macke, Girls in Green, 1914

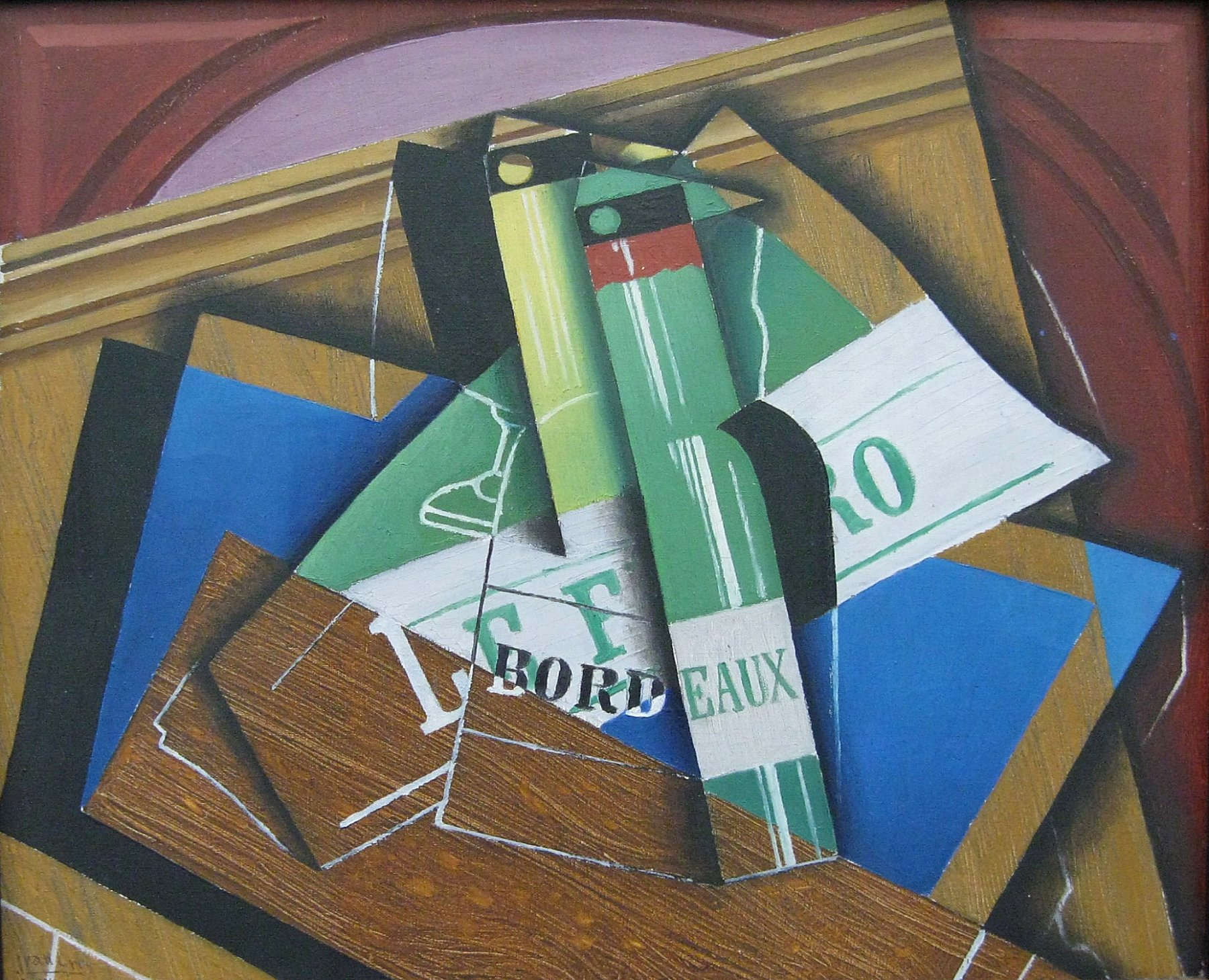
Juan Gris, The Bordeaux Bottle, 1915

Max Ernst, Birds Fish Snake, 1919

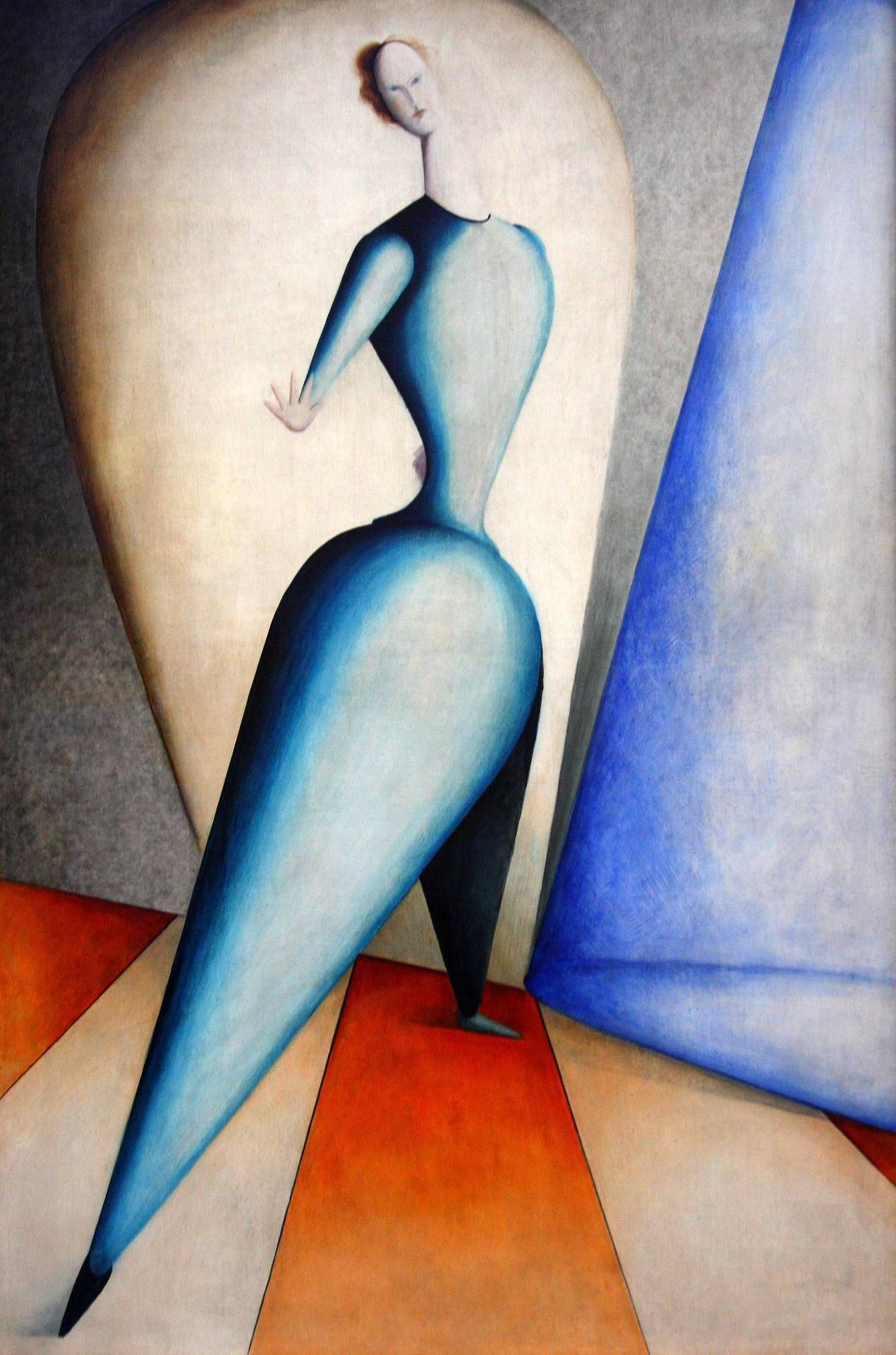
Oskar Schlemmer, Dancer, 1922-23

== See also ==
- List of largest art museums
