= Soltau (disambiguation) =

Soltau is a town in the Lüneburg Heath in Lower Saxony, Germany.

Soltau may also refer to:

- Soltau (Han) station, railway station of Soltau
- Soltau (river), a river of Lower Saxony, Germany

== People ==
- Soltau (surname)
