= August Macke =

German painter (1887–1914)

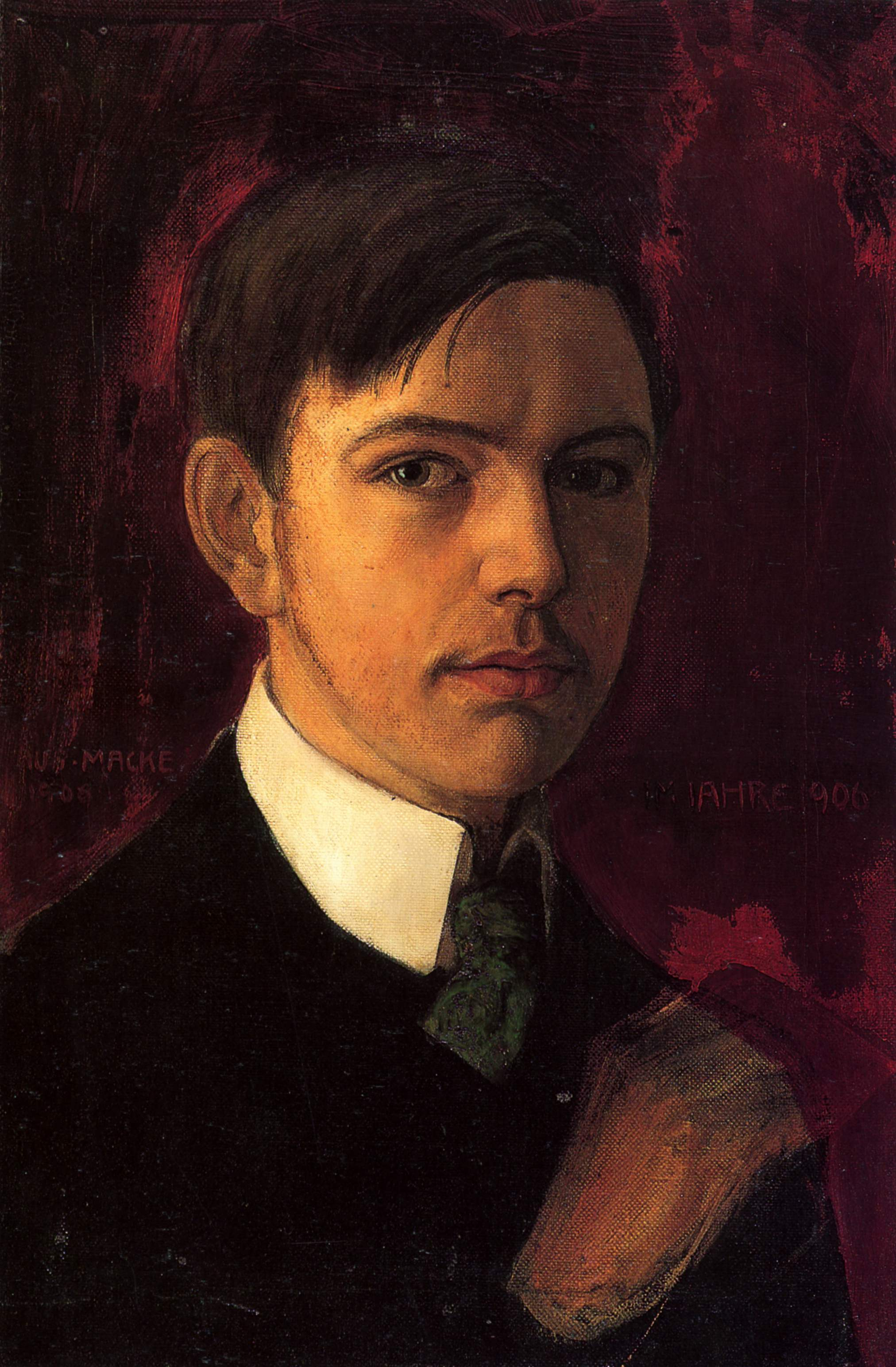
- Self-portrait, oil on canvas, 1906
- Born: August Robert Ludwig Macke; 3 January 1887; Meschede, German Empire
- Died: 26 September 1914 (aged 27) near Perthes-lès-Hurlus, Champagne, France
- Resting place: German Military Cemetery, Souain-Perthes-lès-Hurlus
- Known for: Painting
- Notable work: List of paintings
- Movement: Expressionism

Signature
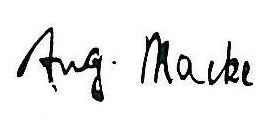

August Robert Ludwig Macke (3 January 1887 – 26 September 1914) was a German Expressionist painter. He was one of the leading members of the German Expressionist group Der Blaue Reiter (The Blue Rider). He lived during a particularly active time for German art: he saw the development of the main German Expressionist movements as well as the arrival of the successive avant-garde movements which were forming in the rest of Europe. As an artist of his time, Macke knew how to integrate into his painting the elements of the avant-garde which most interested him. Like his friend Franz Marc and Otto Soltau, he was one of the young German artists who died in the First World War.

== Early life ==
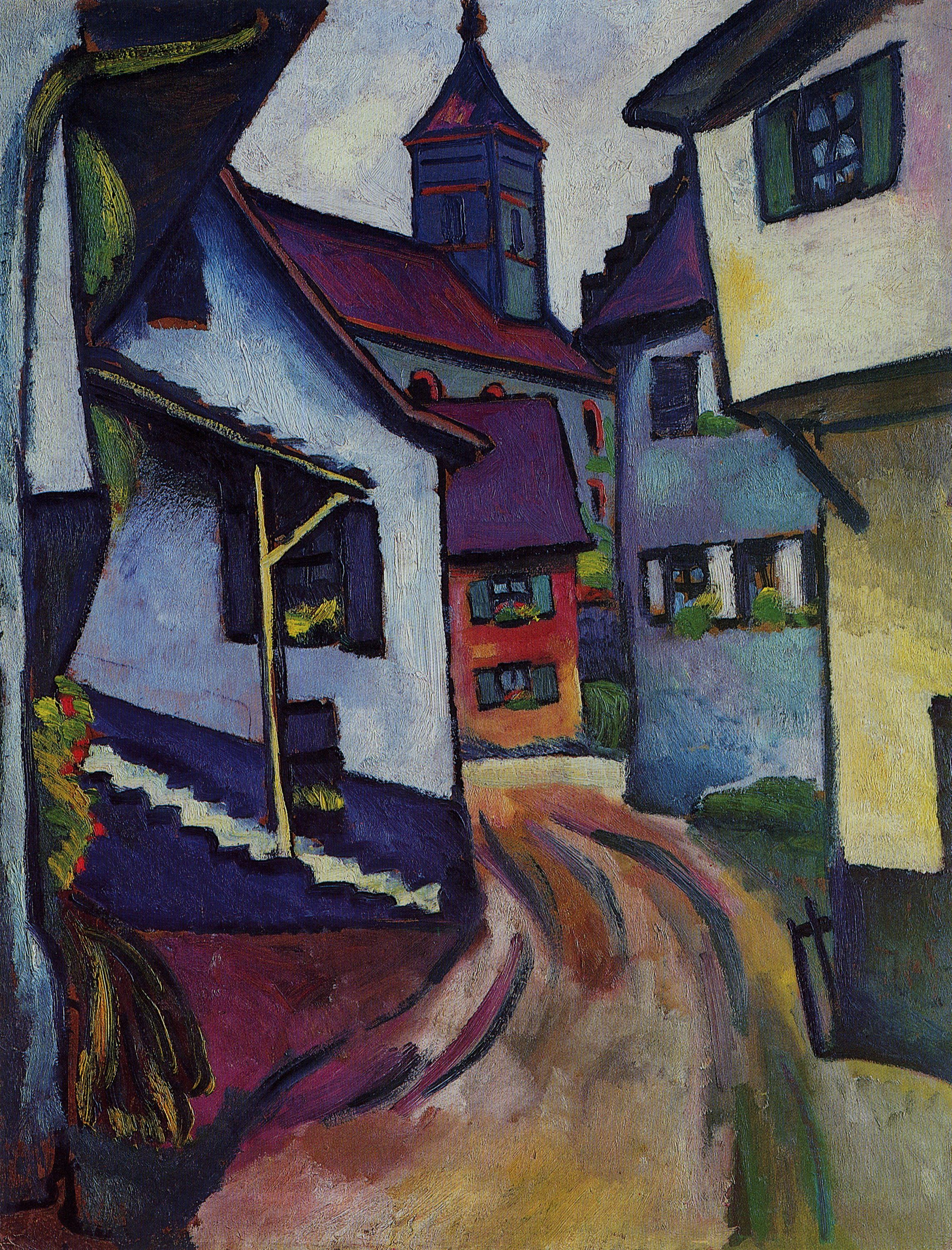
Street with church in Kandern, 1911

August Robert Ludwig Macke was born in Germany on 3 January 1887, in Meschede, Westphalia. He was the only son of August Friedrich Hermann Macke (1845–1904), a building contractor and amateur artist, and his wife, Maria Florentine, née Adolph, (1848–1922), who came from a farming family in Westphalia's Sauerland region. Shortly after August's birth the family settled at Cologne, where Macke was educated at the Kreuzgymnasium (1897–1900) and became a friend of Hans Thuar, who also became an artist. In 1900, when he was thirteen, the family moved to Bonn, where Macke studied at the Realgymnasium and became a friend of Walter Gerhardt and Gerhardt's sister, Elisabeth, whom he married a few years later.

The first artistic works to make an impression on the boy were his father's drawings, the Japanese prints collected by his friend Thuar's father and the works of Arnold Böcklin which he saw on a visit to Basel in 1900. In 1904 Macke's father died, and in that year Macke enrolled at the Kunstakademie Düsseldorf, under Adolf Maennchen (1904–1906). During this period he also took evening classes under Fritz Helmut Ehmke (1905), did some work as a stage and costume designer at the Schauspielhaus Düsseldorf, and visited northern Italy (1905) and Netherlands, Belgium and Britain (1906).

== Artistic career 1907–1914 ==
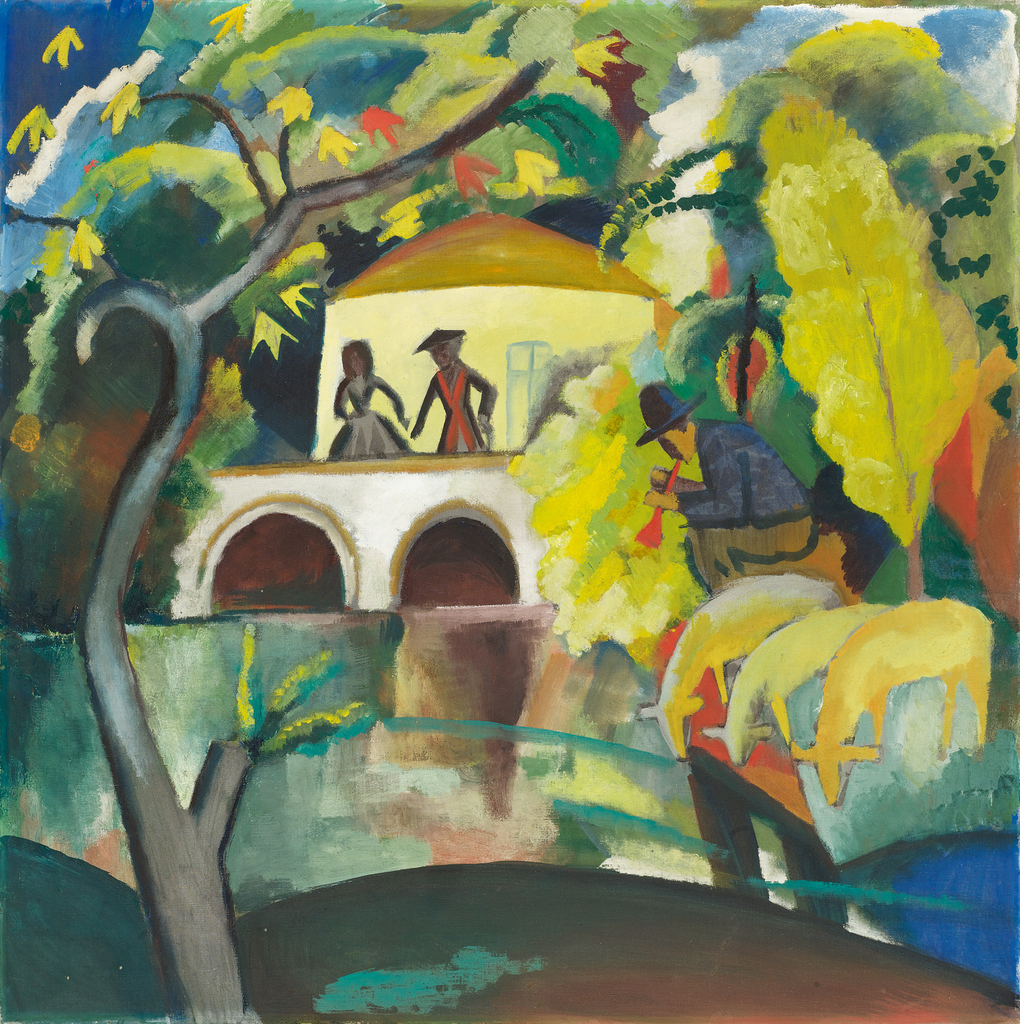
Rokoko,1912, oil on canvas, 89 x 89 cm, National Museum of Art, Architecture and Design, Norway

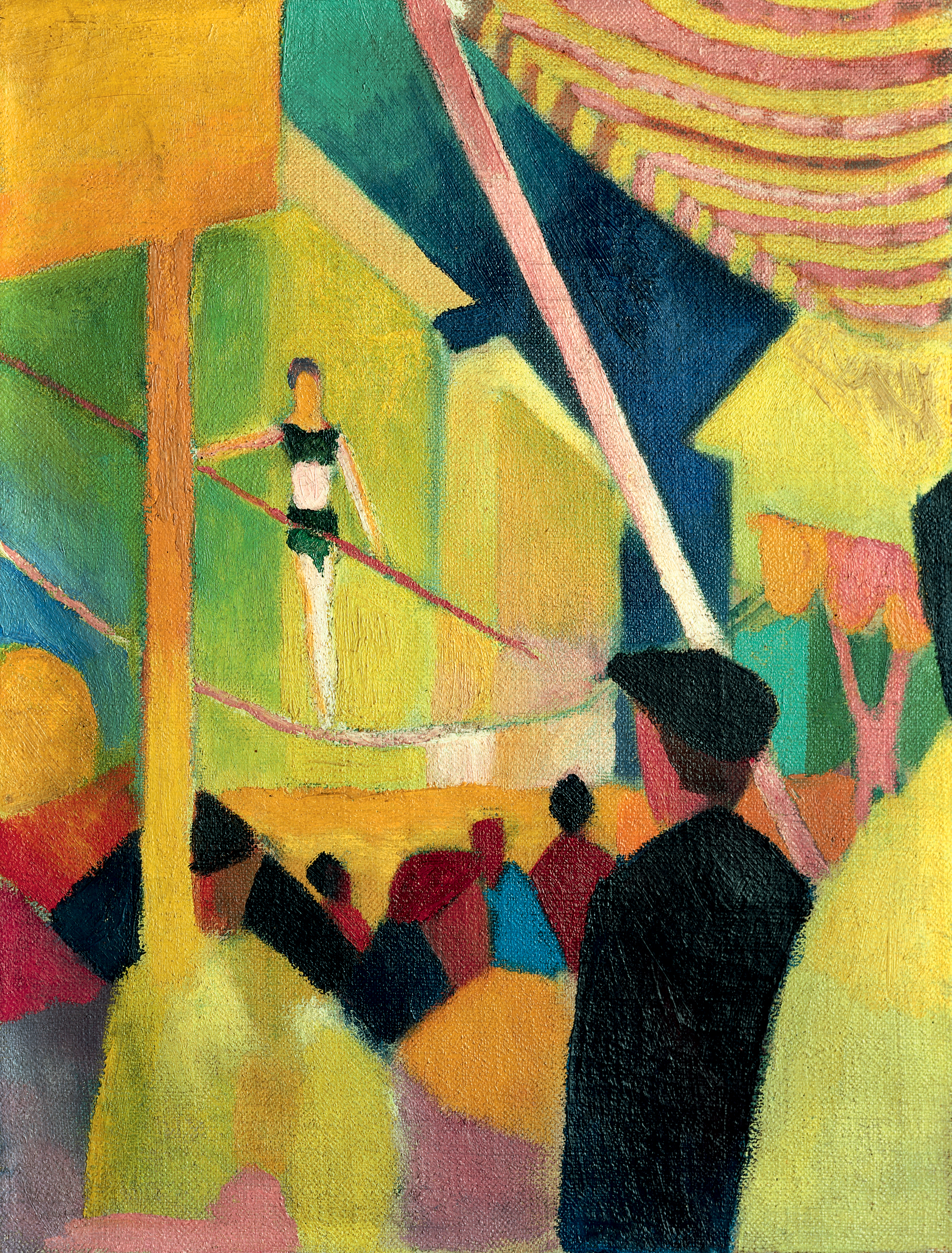
Tightrope walker, 1913

Thereafter Macke lived most of his creative life in Bonn, with the exception of a few periods spent at Lake Thun in Switzerland and various trips to Paris, Italy, the Netherlands and Tunisia. In Paris, where he traveled for the first time in 1907, Macke saw the work of the Impressionists, and shortly after he went to Berlin and spent a few months in Lovis Corinth's studio. His style was formed within the mode of French Impressionism and Post-Impressionism and later went through a Fauve period. In 1909 he married Elisabeth Gerhardt. In 1910, through his friendship with Franz Marc, Macke met Kandinsky and for a while shared the non-objective aesthetic and the mystical and symbolic interests of Der Blaue Reiter.

Macke's meeting with Robert Delaunay in Paris in 1912 was to be a sort of revelation for him. Delaunay's chromatic Cubism, which Apollinaire had called Orphism, influenced Macke's art from that point onwards. His Shops Windows can be considered a personal interpretation of Delaunay's Windows, combined with the simultaneity of images found in Italian Futurism.

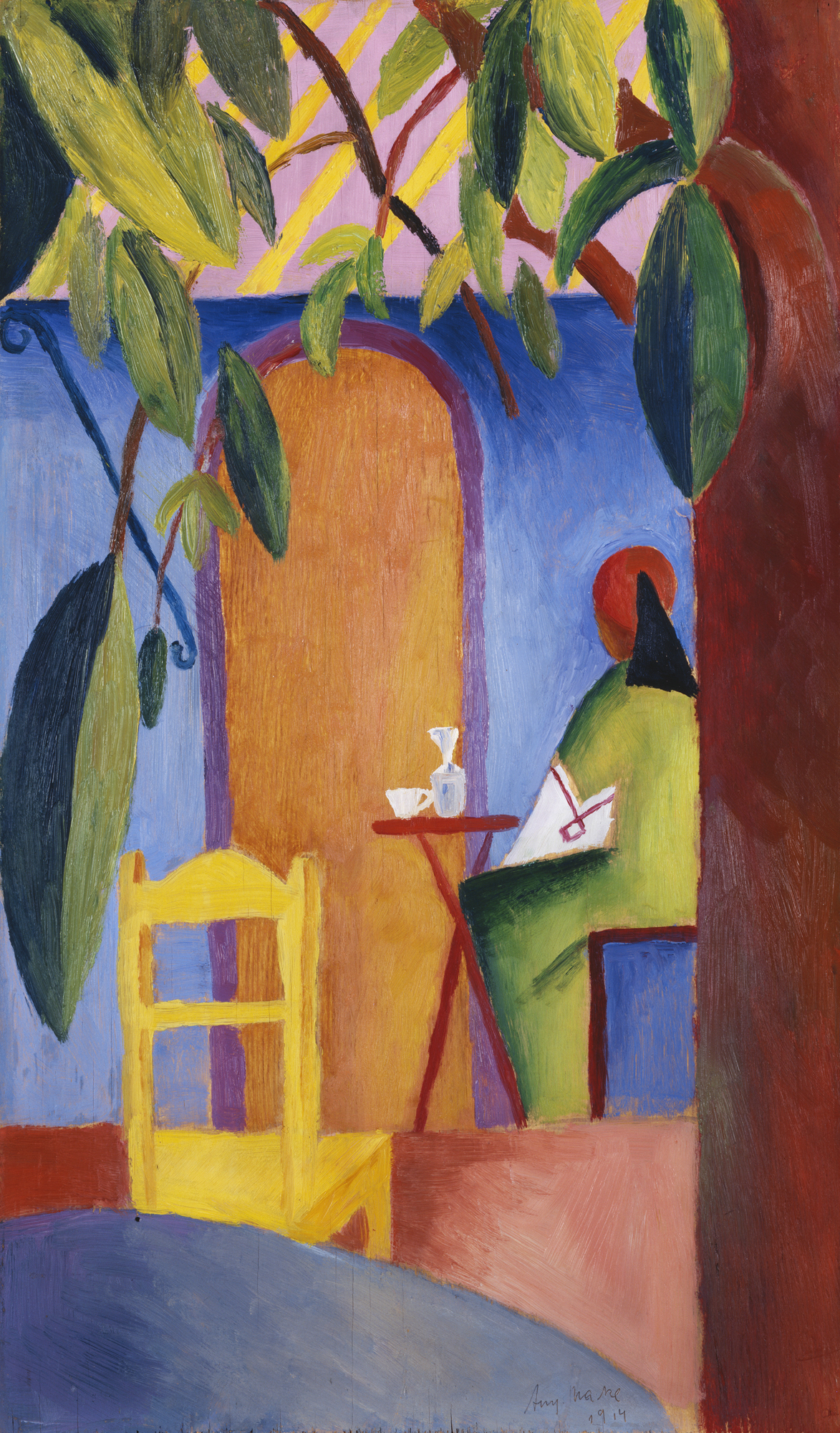
Türkisches Café

The exotic atmosphere of Tunisia, where Macke traveled in April 1914 with Paul Klee and Louis Moilliet was fundamental for the creation of the luminist approach of his final period, during which he produced a series of works now considered masterpieces, like his famous painting Türkisches Café. August Macke's oeuvre can be considered as Expressionism (in its original German flourishing between 1905 and 1925), and also as part of Fauvism. The paintings concentrate primarily on expressing feelings and moods rather than reproducing objective reality, usually distorting colour and form.

Macke's career was cut short by his early death in the second month of the First World War at the front in Champagne, France, on 26 September 1914. He was buried in the German Military Cemetery in Souain-Perthes-lès-Hurlus. His final painting, Farewell, depicts the mood of gloom that settled after the outbreak of war.

== Selected paintings ==
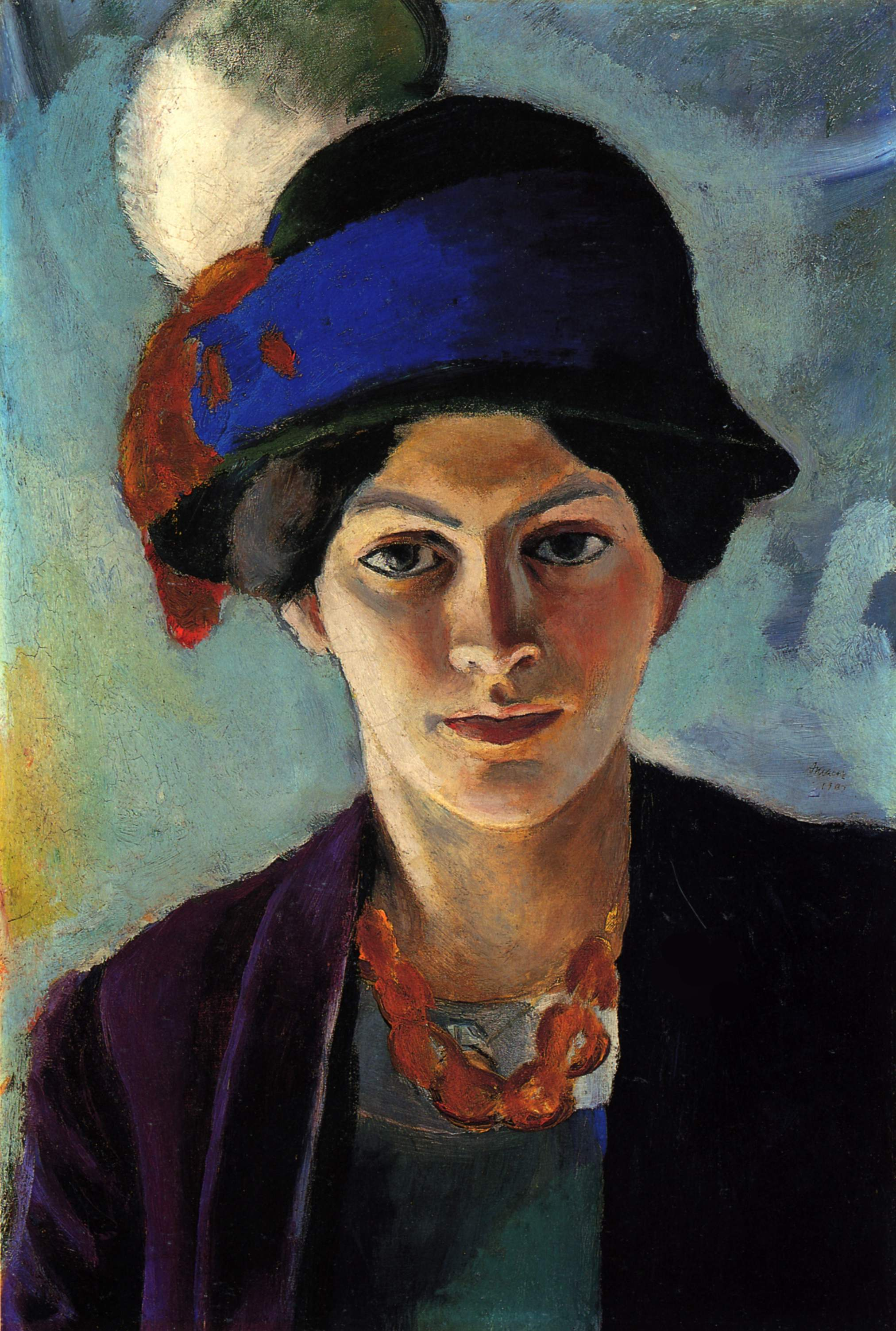
The artist's wife in blue hat, 1909

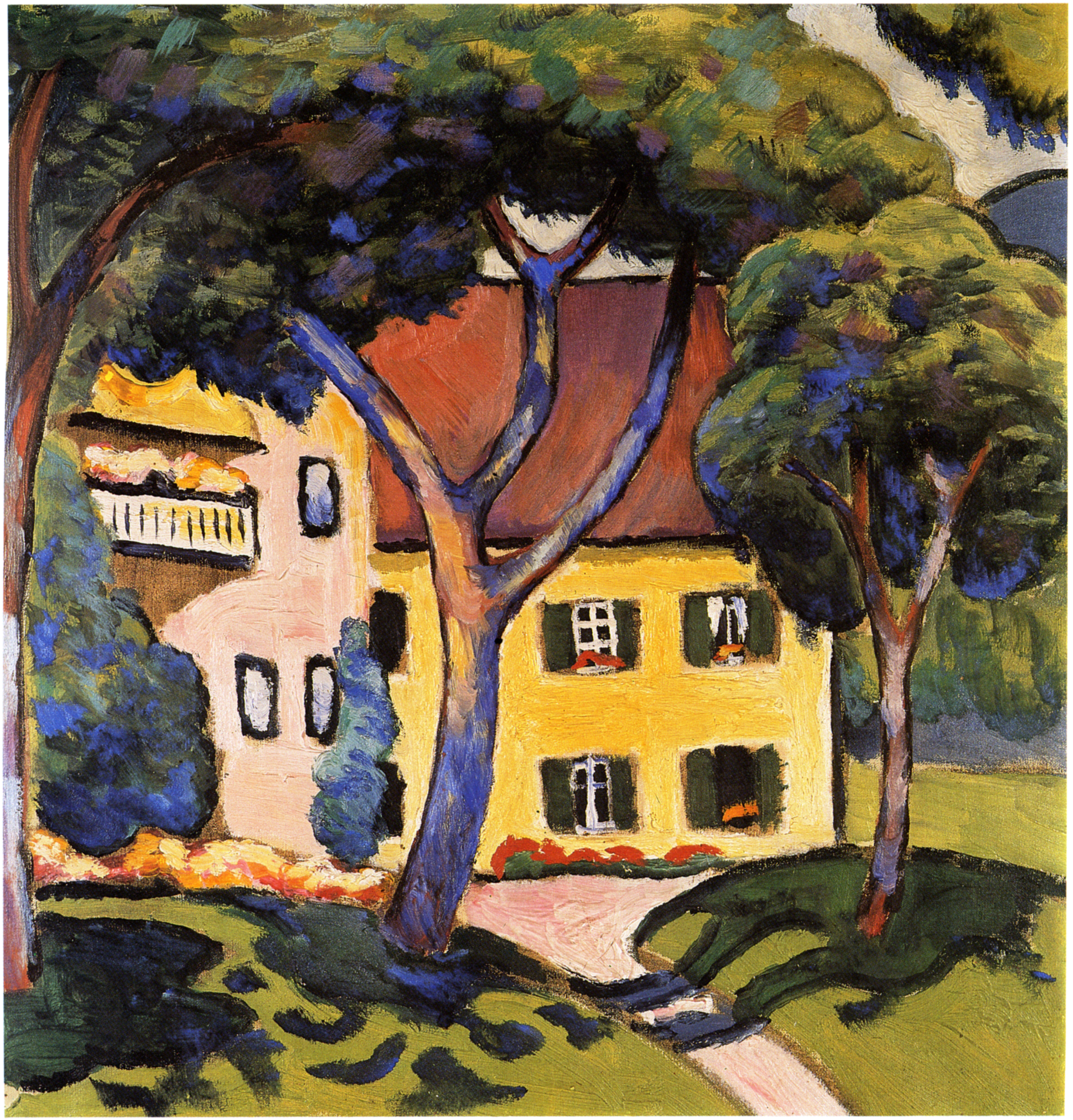
Staudacher's house at the Tegernsee, 1910

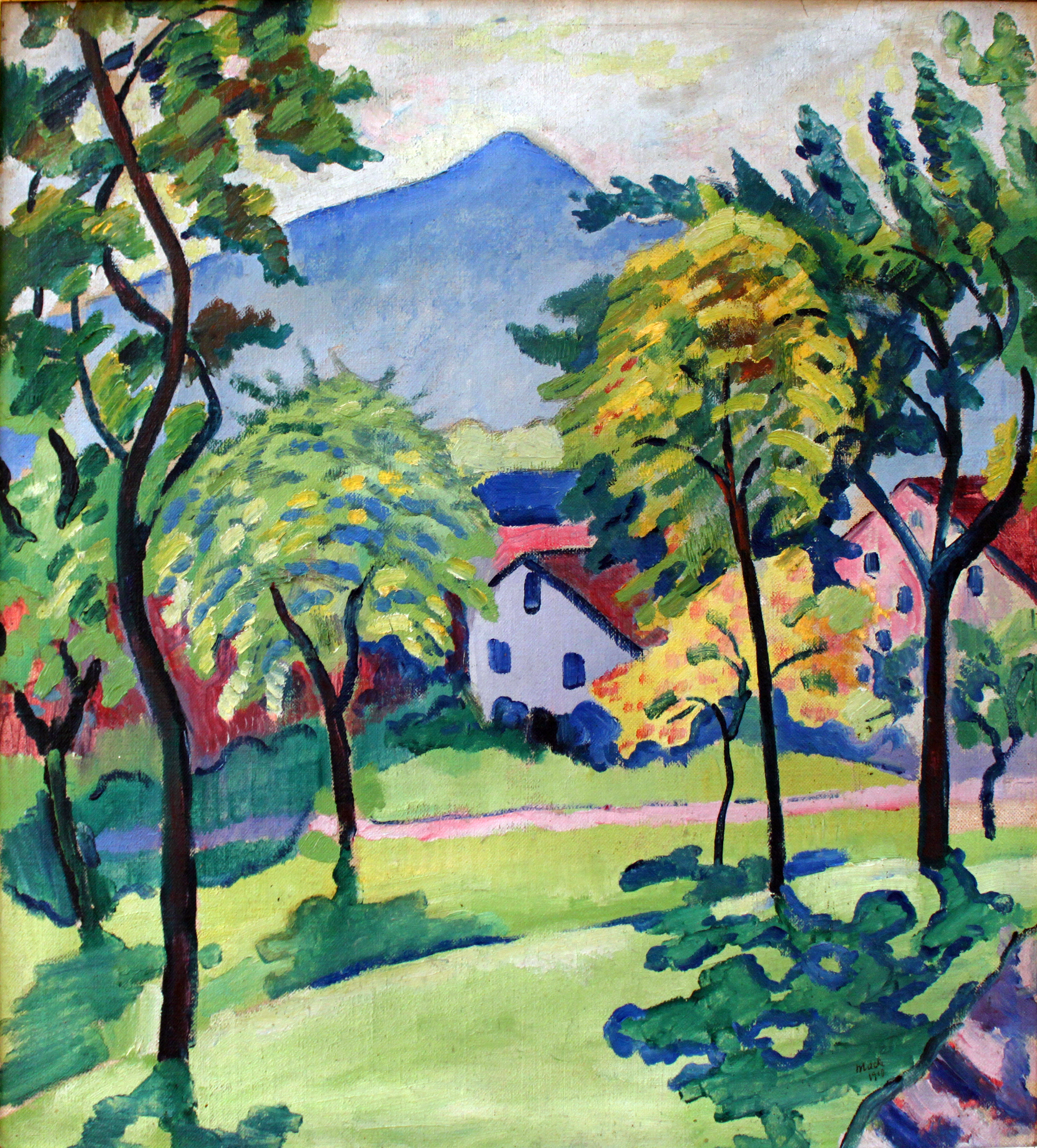
Tegernsee landscape, 1910, Germanisches Nationalmuseum

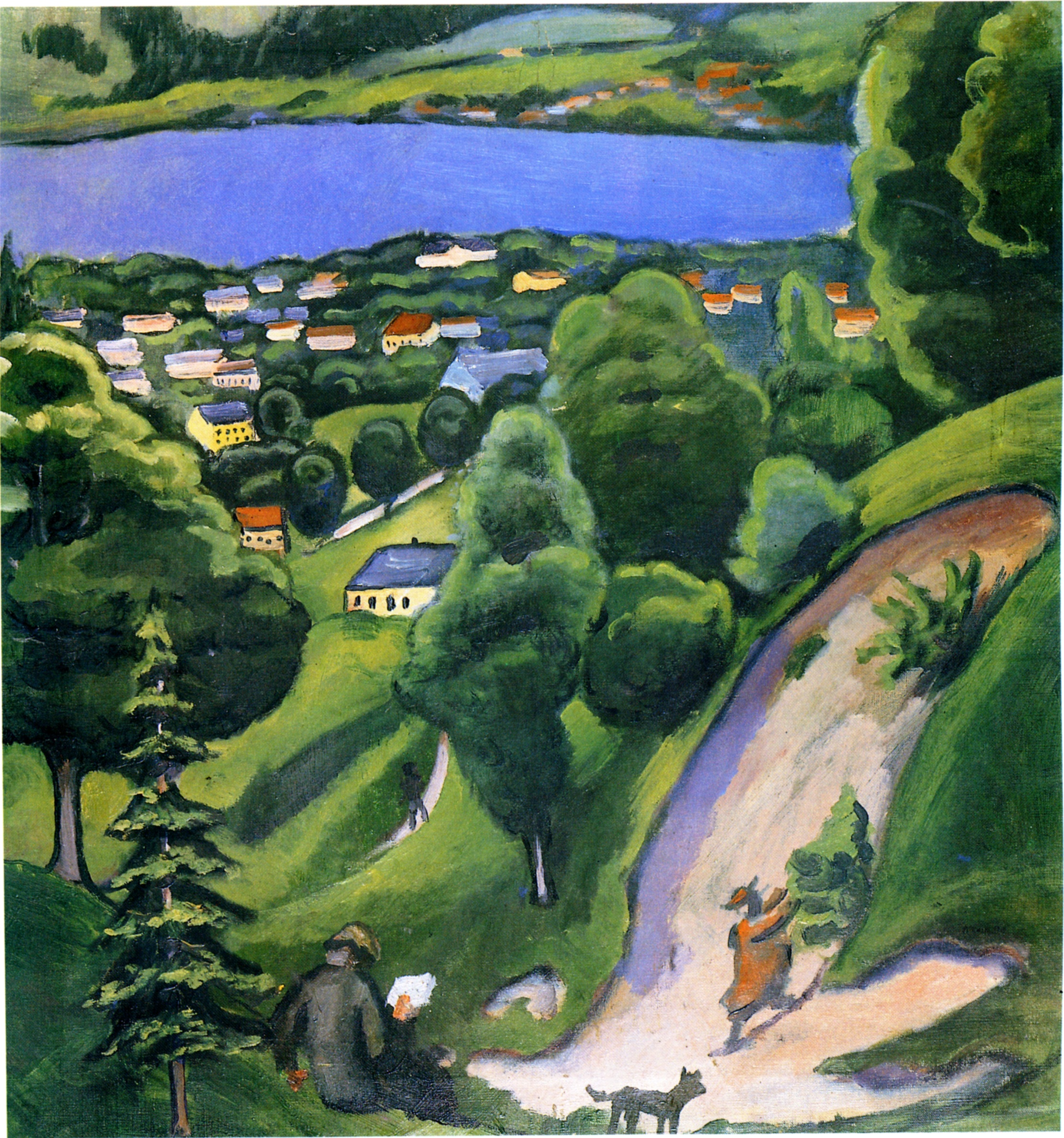
Landschaft am Tegernsee mit lesendem Mann, 1910

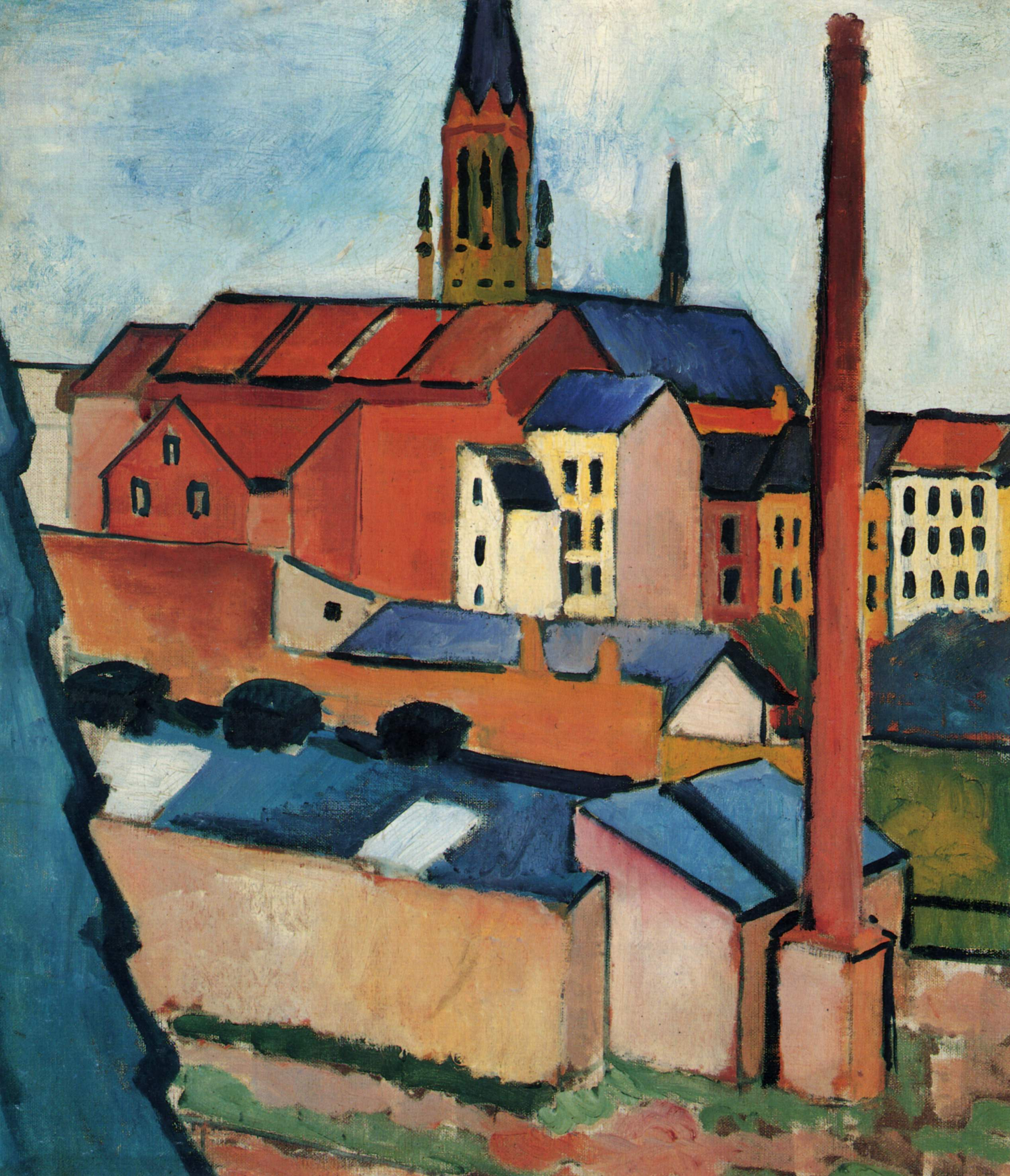
St. Mary's with houses and chimney (Bonn), 1911, Kunstmuseum Bonn

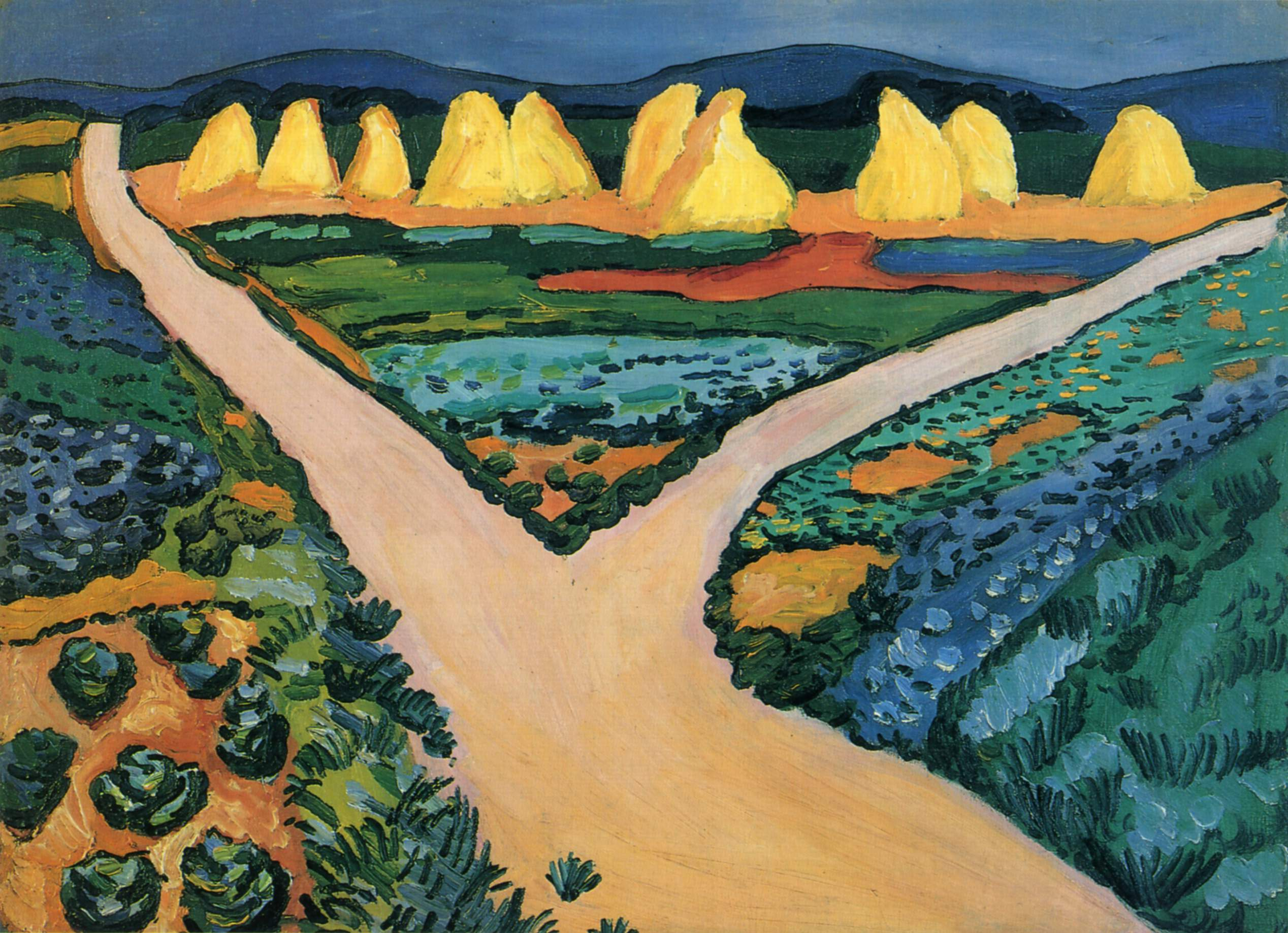
Vegetable fields, 1911, Museum Ludwig, Cologne, Germany

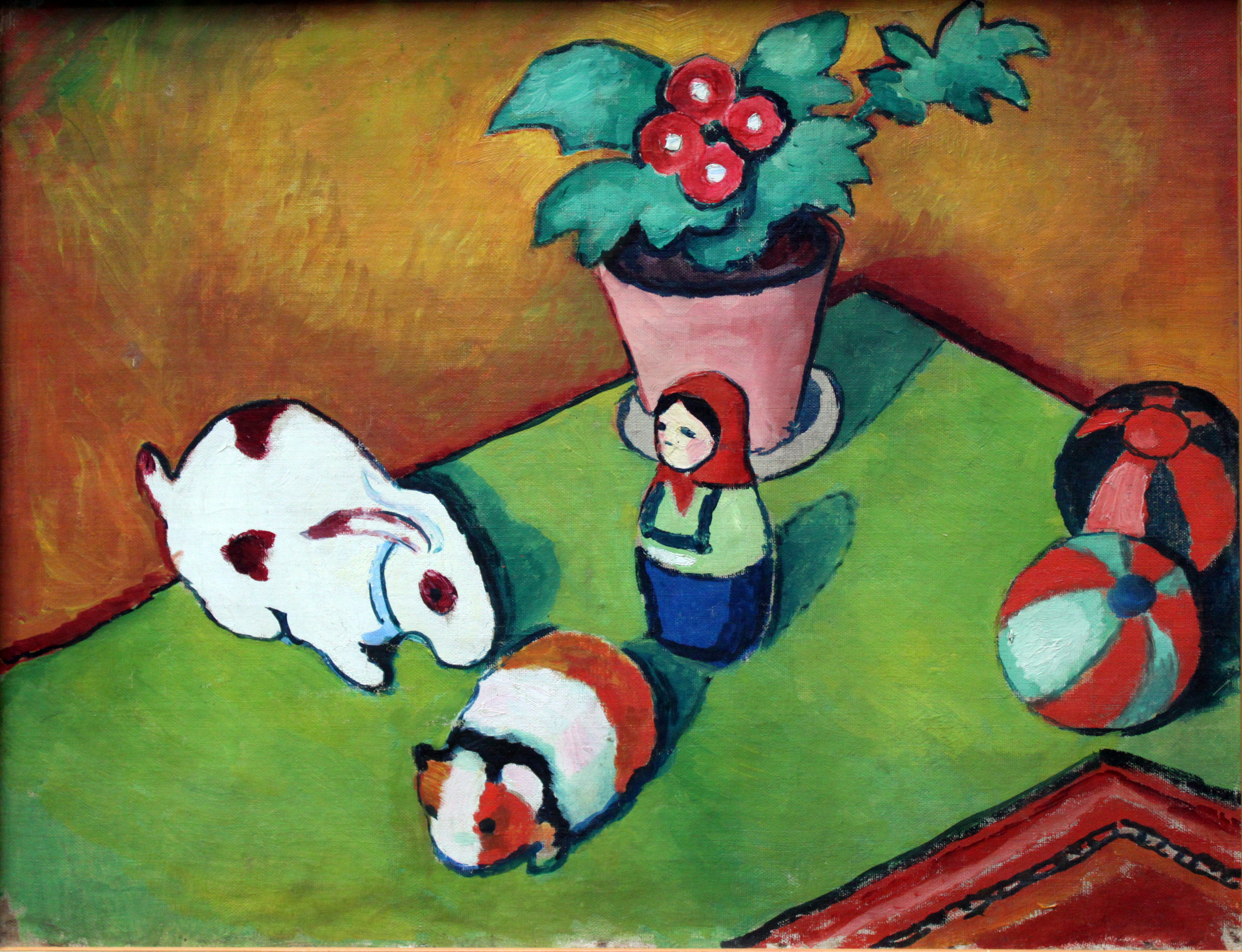
Little Walter's Toys, 1912, Städel

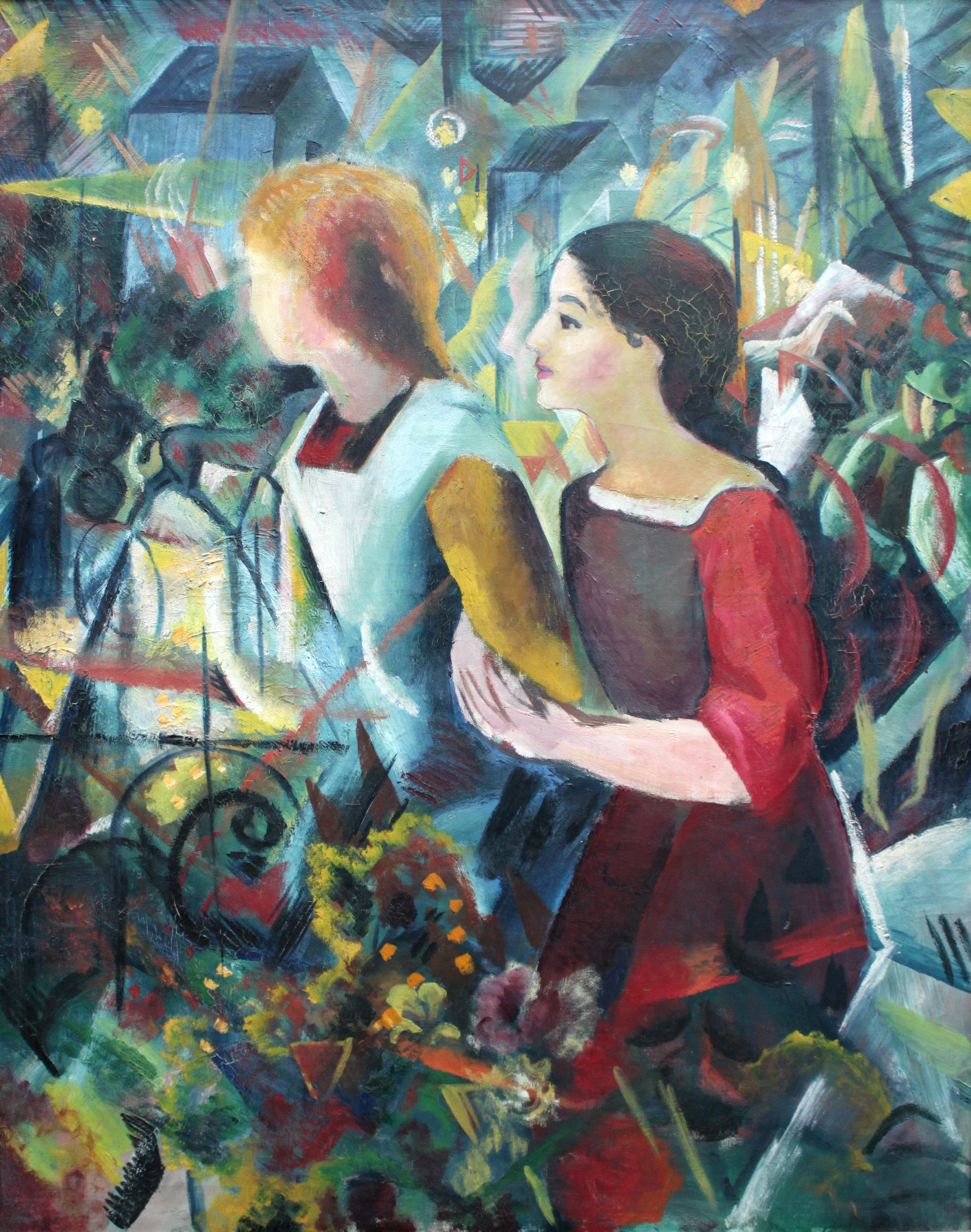
Two girls, 1913, Städelsches Kunstinstitut

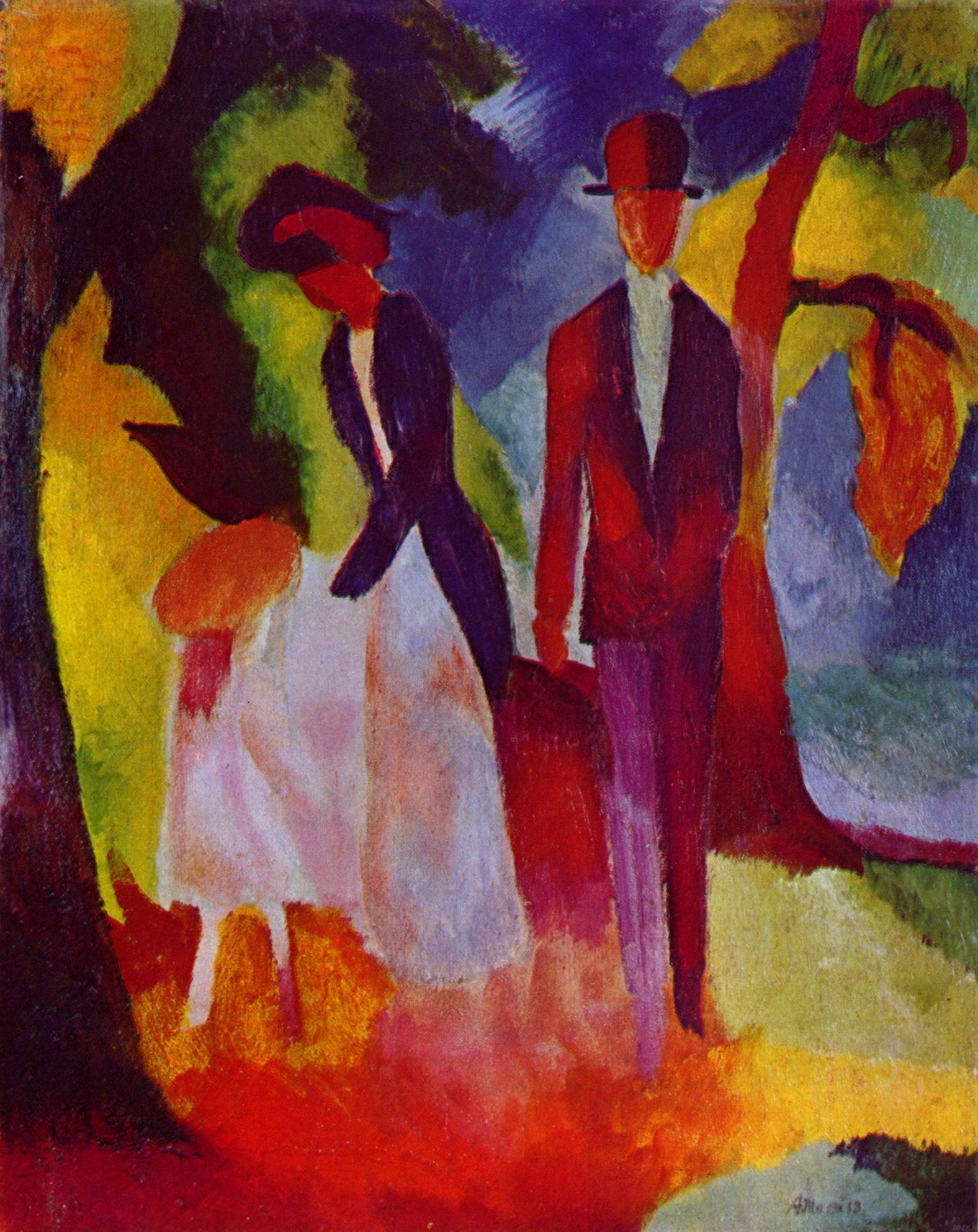
Leute am blauen See, 1913

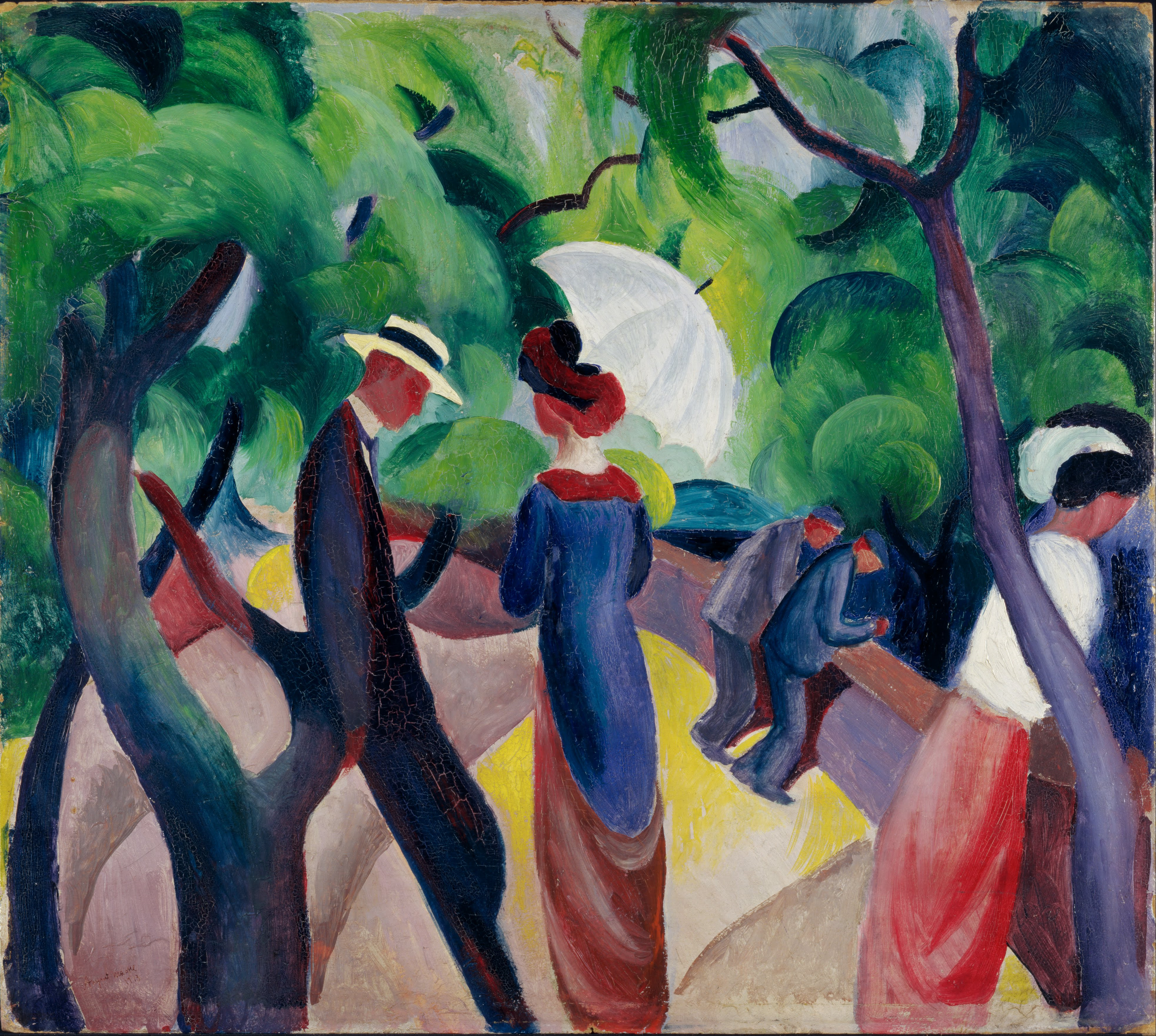
Promenade, 1913

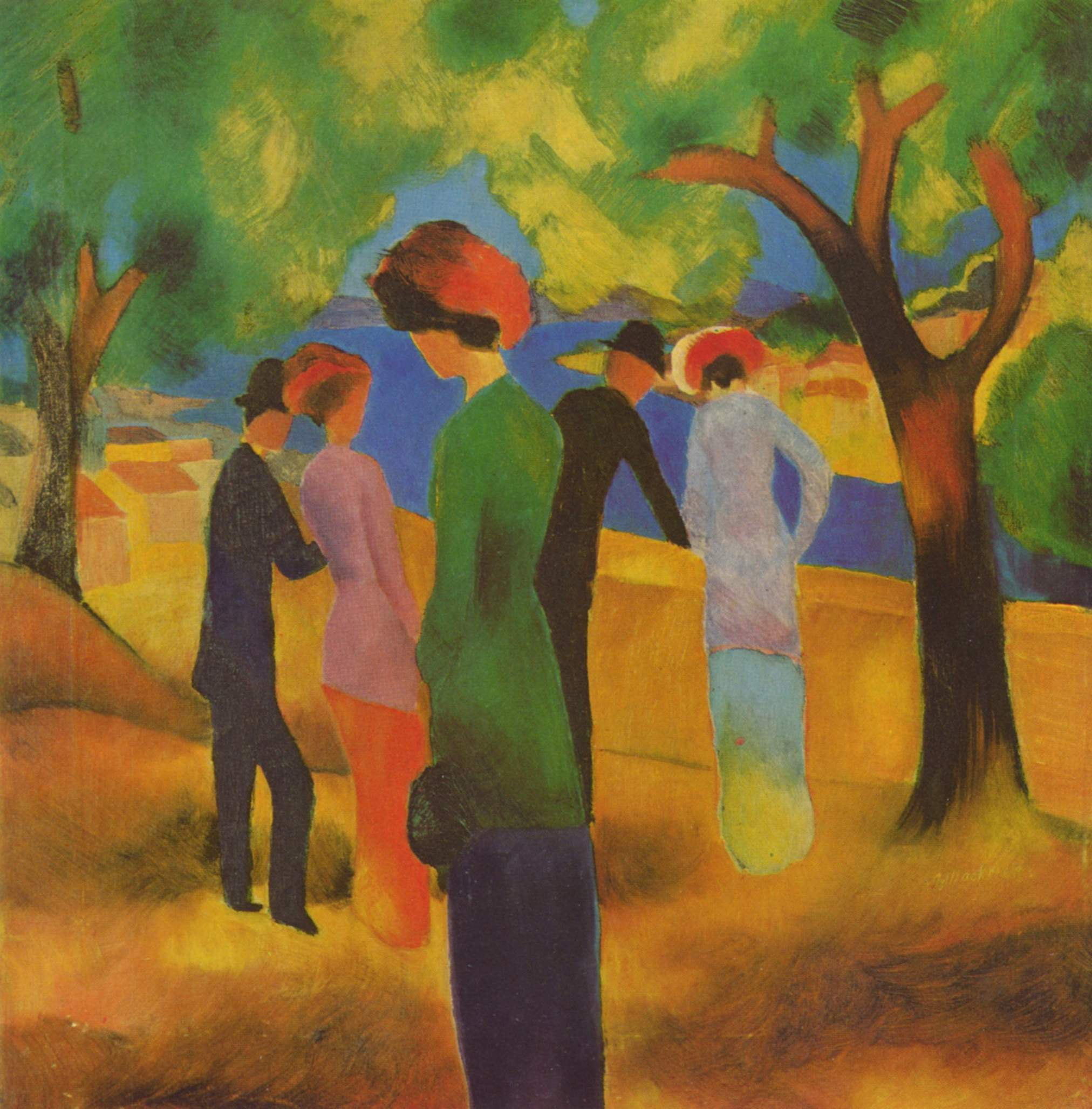
Lady in a Green Jacket, 1913, Museum Ludwig, Cologne, Germany

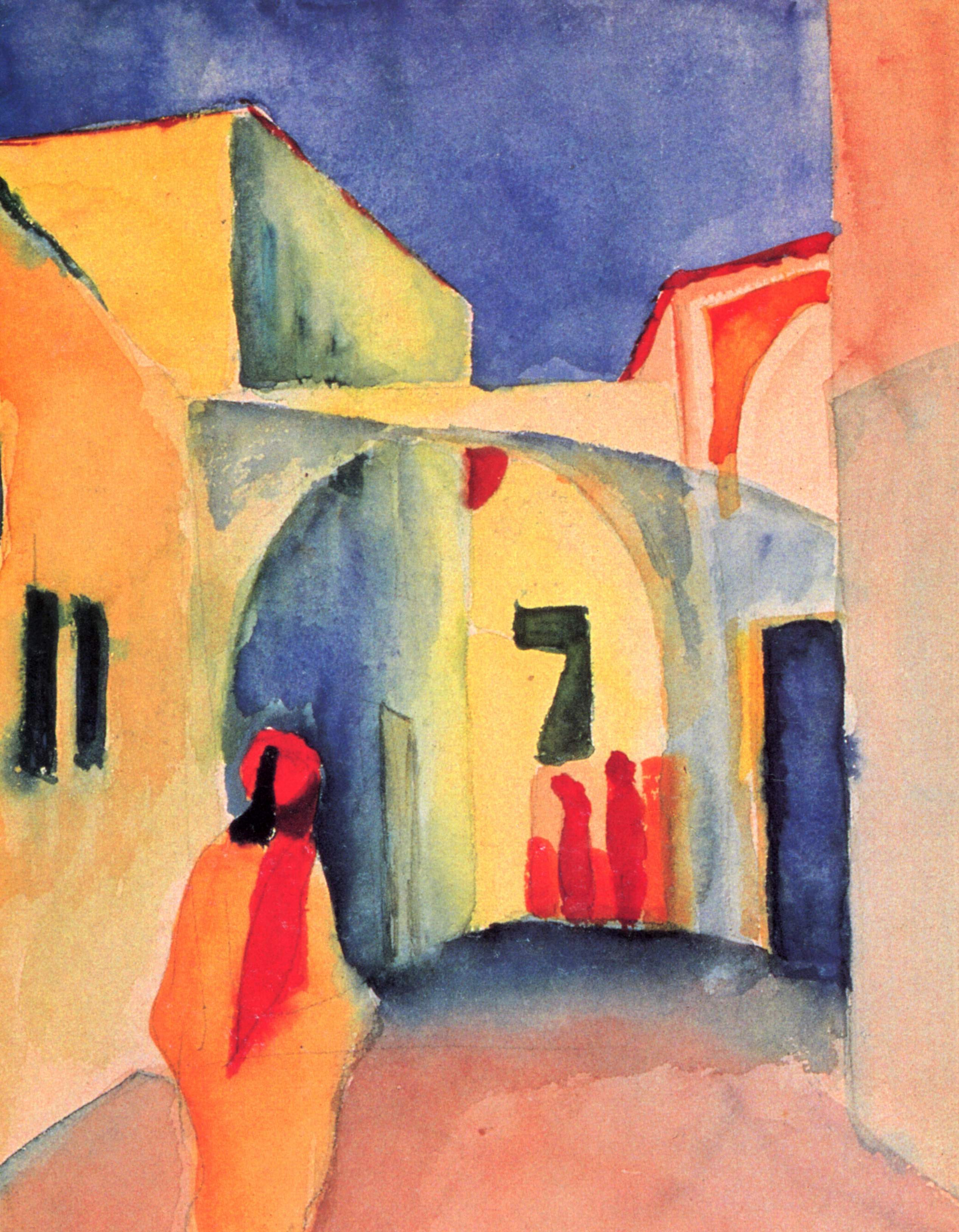
View into a lane, 1914, watercolor

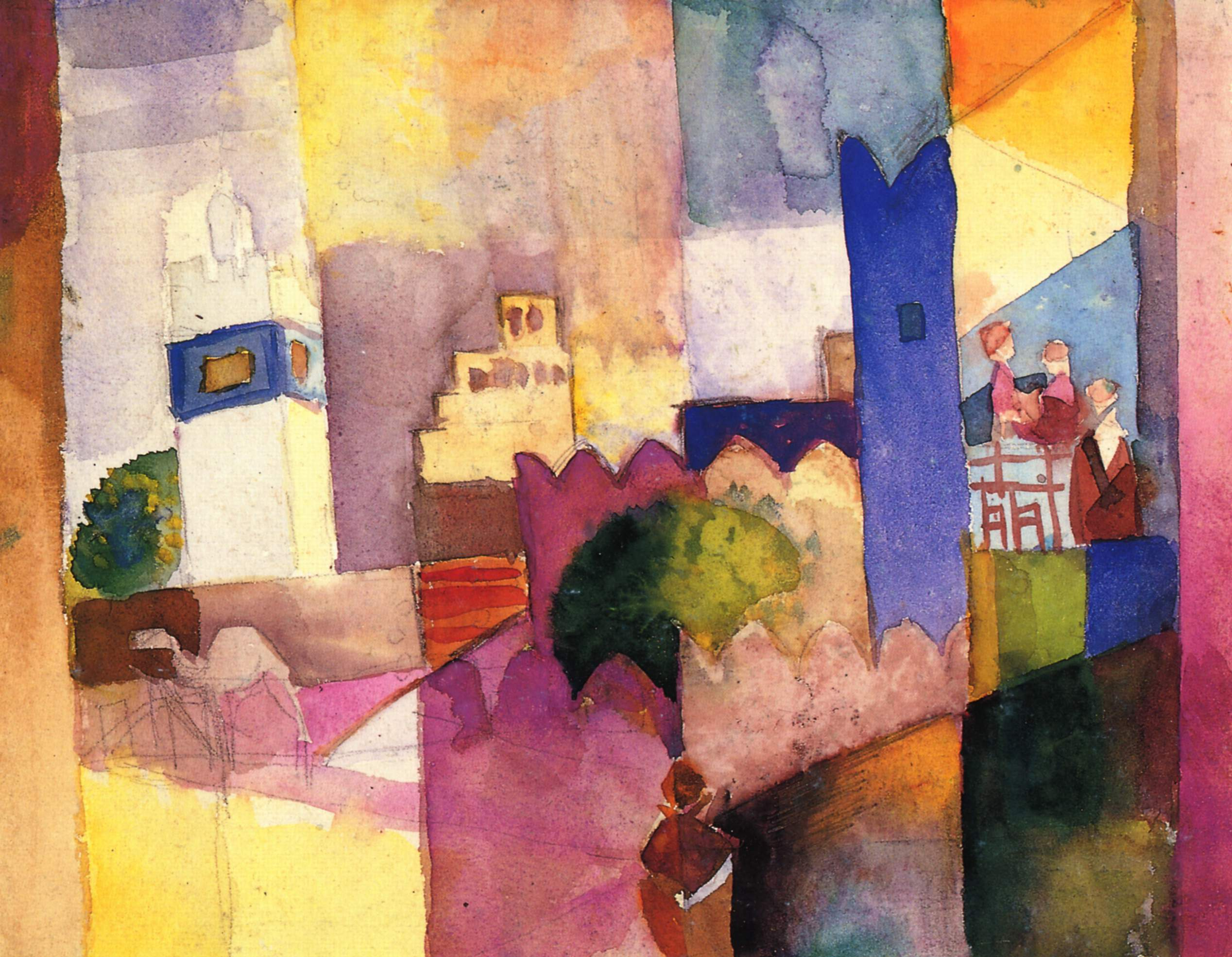
Kairouan (III), 1914, watercolor, Westphalian State Museum for Art and Cultural History, Münster

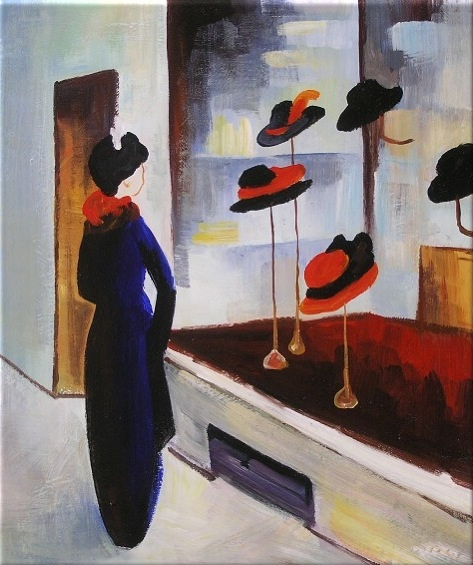
Hutladen III, 1914

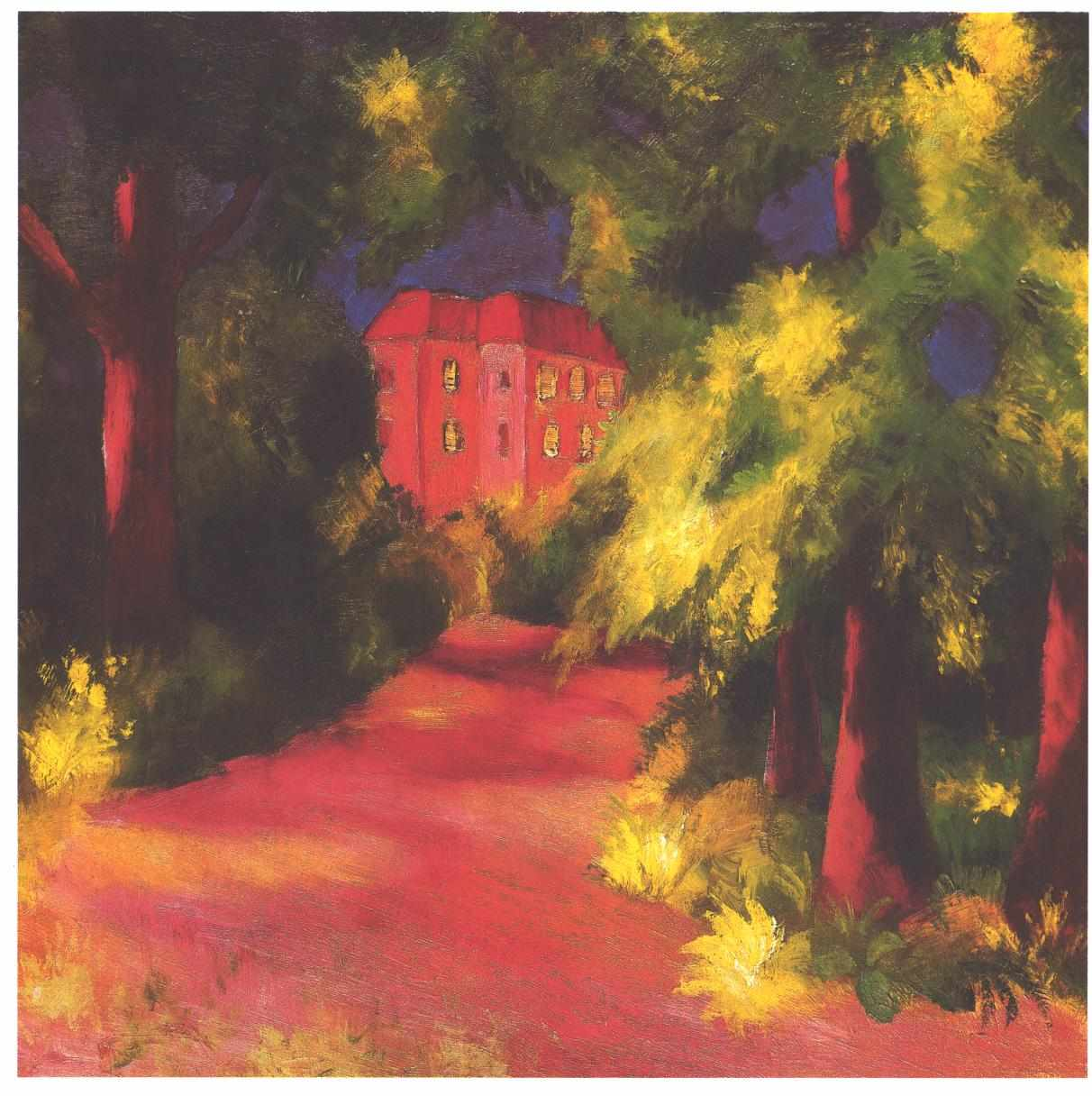
Red house in the park, 1914

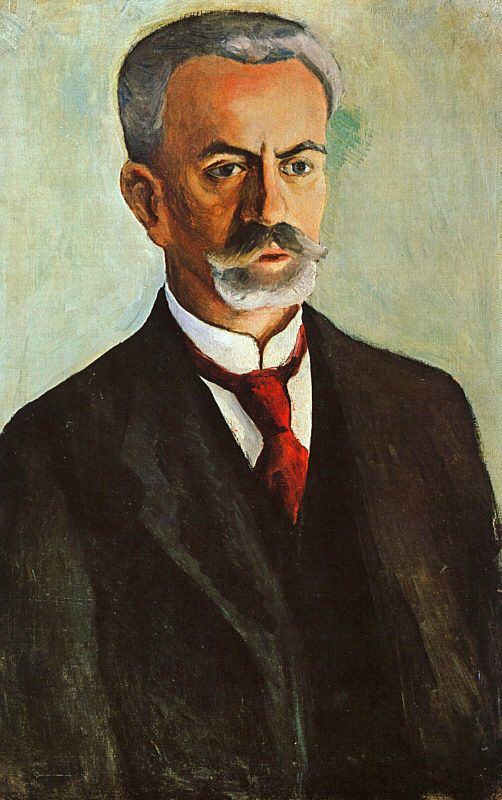
Portrait of Bernhard Koehler, 1910, Städtische Galerie im Lenbachhaus, Munich

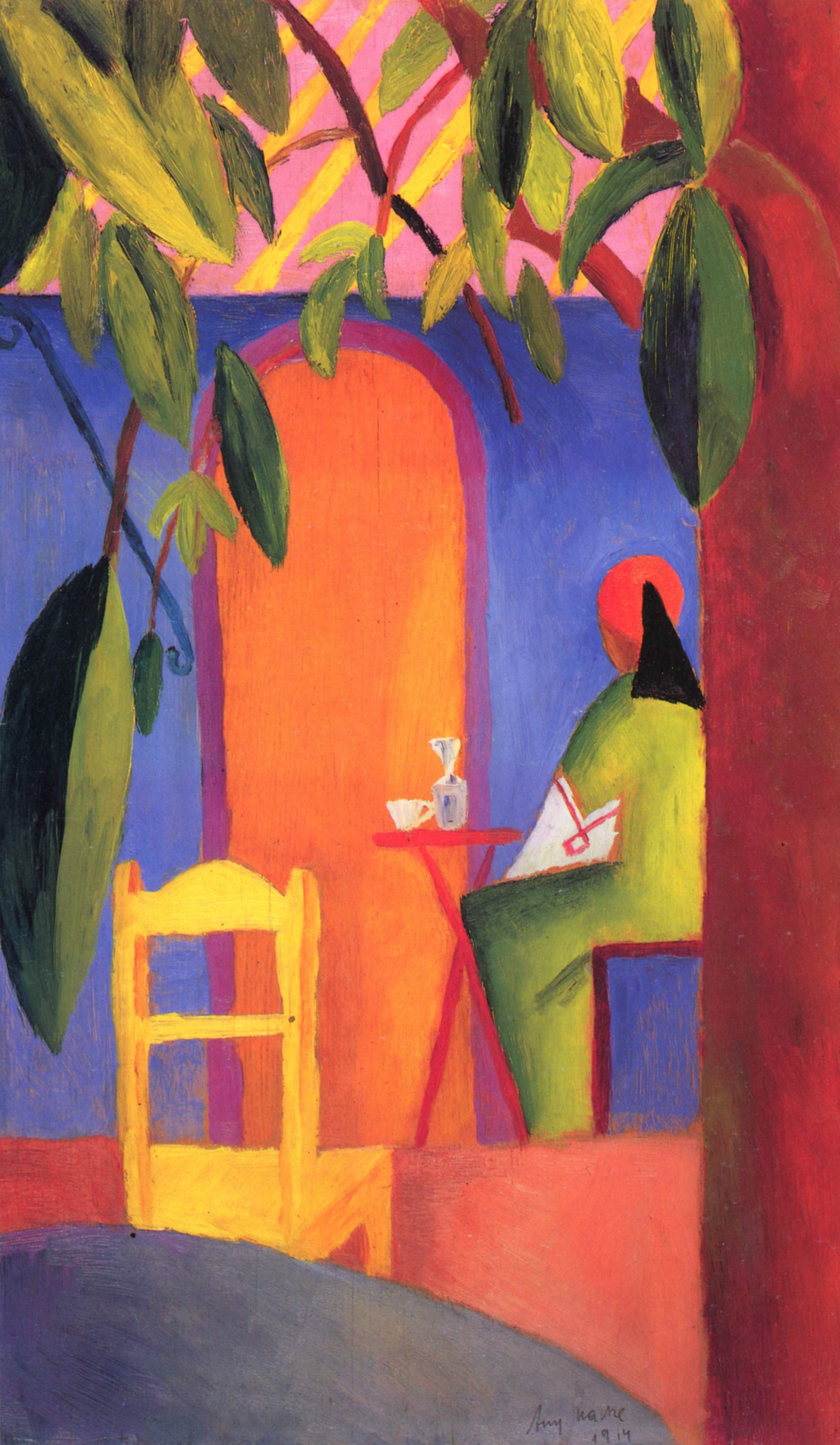
Turkish Café, 1914, Städtische Galerie im Lenbachhaus, Munich

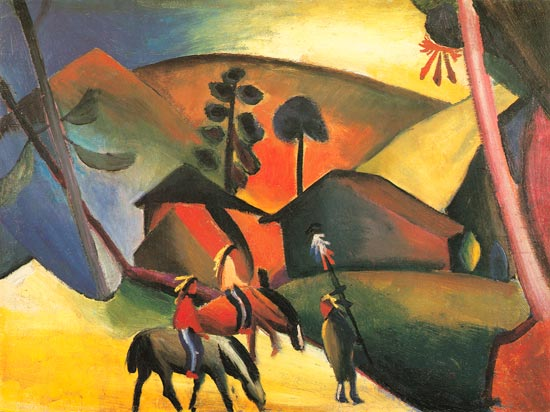
Indians on Horseback, 1911, Städtische Galerie im Lenbachhaus, Munich

== August Macke Prize ==
The August Macke Prize, was given the first time in 1959 by the districts Arnsberg, Brilon, Olpe and Meschede, town of birth of August Macke in Germany.

== August-Macke-Haus ==
The August-Macke-Haus is a museum dedicated to August Macke founded in 1991. It is located in Macke's former home in Bonn, where he lived from 1911 to 1914.

== Art market ==
At a 1997 Christie's auction, Macke's The Couple at a Garden Table (1914) was sold for £2 million. Market in Tunis (1914) sold for £2.86 million ($4.1 million) in 2000. Consigned by the estate of Ernst Beyeler, the artist's In the Bazar (1914) was auctioned for £3.96 million – then four and a half times the high estimate – at Christie's in 2011.

In 2007, the Berlin auction house Villa Grisebach sold Macke’s Woman with a Parrot in a Landscape for €2.4 million, setting a record price for the artist. The painting's provenance mentioned it was confiscated in 1937 as 'degenerate'. In the 2008 catalogue of Macke’s works, Hildebrand Gurlitt, Hitler's art dealer was mentioned in the provenance.
