= Soltau (surname) =

Soltau is a surname. Notable people with the surname include:

- Annegret Soltau (born 1946), German artist
- Eleanor Soltau (1877–1962), English doctor
- Gordy Soltau (1925–2014), American football player
- Henrietta Soltau (1843–1934), British evangelist
- Jill Soltau (born 1967), American businesswoman
- Knuth Meyer-Soltau (born 1965), German politician
- Mirko Soltau (born 1980), German football player
- Otto Soltau (1885–1915), German artist
- Pauline Soltau (1833–1902), German painter, violinist
- Wilfried Soltau (1912–1995), German sprint canoer
