= Adolf Maennchen =

German painter (1860–1920)

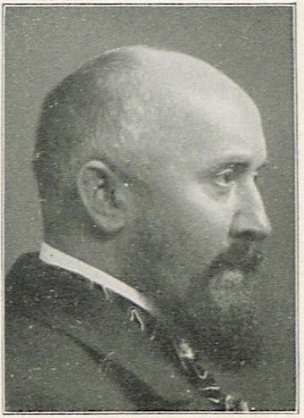
Adolf Maennchen (c.1902)

Theodor Gustav Alwin Adolf Maennchen (7 September 1860 – 30 March 1920) was a German landscape and genre painter.

== Life and work ==
He was born in Rudolstadt to Carl Maennchen, a Master tanner, and his wife, Emilie née Güntsche. His younger brother, Albert, also became a painter.

After serving an apprenticeship as a decorative painter, he plied his trade as a wandering journeyman in Germany and Austria. During this extended period, he also spent some time at the Dresden School of Applied Arts (1878–1879), and took night classes at the teaching institute of the Arts and Crafts Museum in Berlin (1880–1883). In 1883, he became a full-time student at the Berlin University of the Arts, which he attended until 1888. His instructors there included Julius Ehrentraut, Paul Thumann, Otto Knille and Eugen Bracht.

He continued to work as a decorative painter while studying and, upon graduating, was able to make a study trip to Italy and North Africa. He travelled whenever possible; visiting Switzerland, the Netherlands and France. In Paris, he attended the Académie Julian, where he took lessons from Jules-Joseph Lefebvre and Tony Robert-Fleury.

In 1896, he was awarded a small gold medal at the Große Berliner Kunstausstellung. He received another gold medal at the Exposition Universelle (1900), and held a major exhibition at the Glaspalast in 1901.

From 1889 to 1893, he was a teacher at the Burg Giebichenstein University of Art and Design in Halle, then taught at the Baugewerkschule in Danzig until 1901. The following year, he was named a Professor and head of the drawing classes at the Kunstakademie Düsseldorf. He held those positions until 1918. He died in 1920 in Düsseldorf.

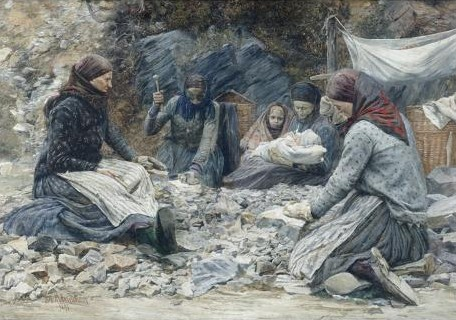
The Stone Breakers, 1897
