= Otto Soltau =

German painter (1885–1915)

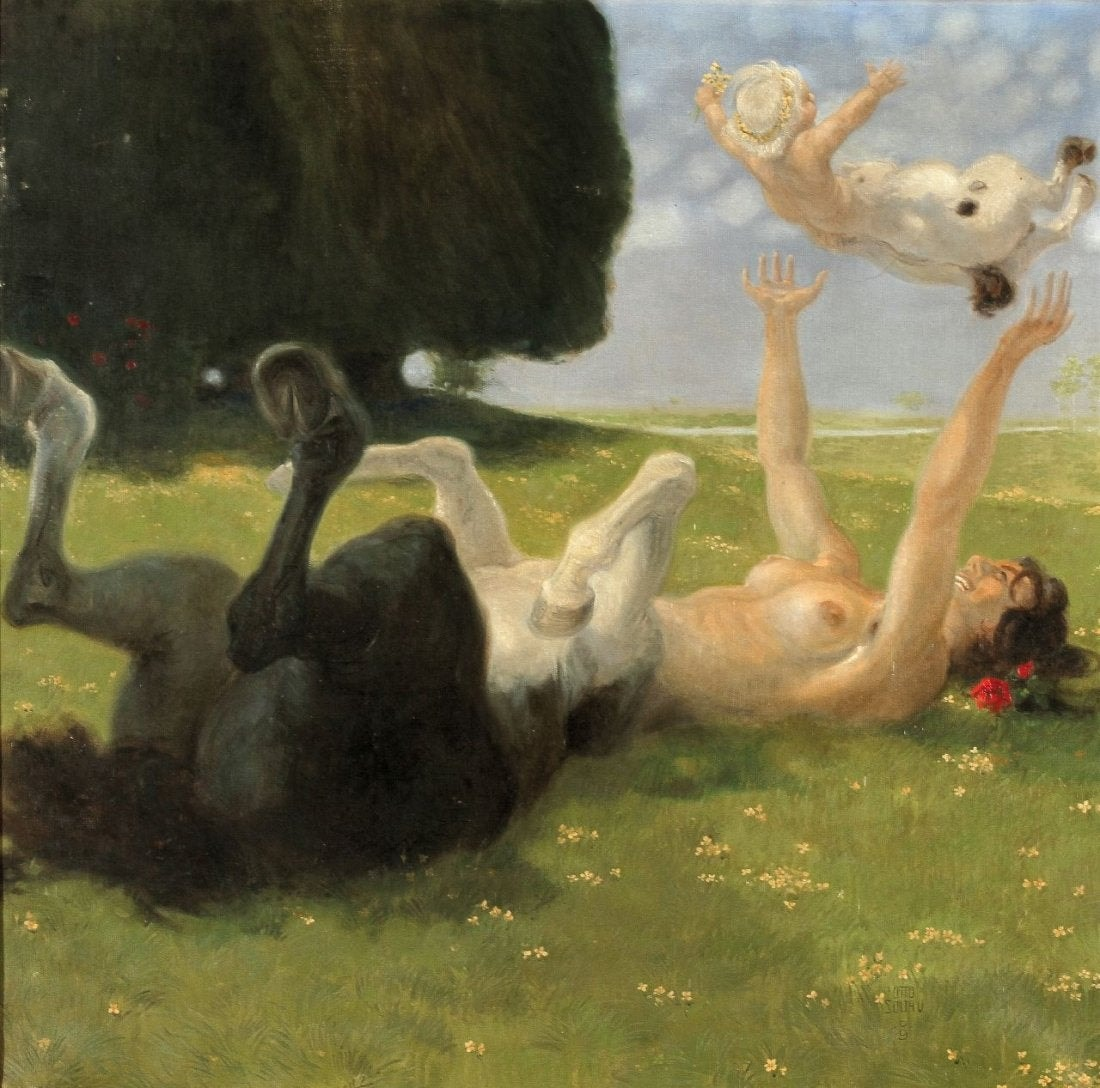
The Centaur Playing With Her Child, 1909

Otto Soltau (27 March 1885 in Rendsburg – 27 May 1915) was a German painter who grew up in Arnis. Like August Macke, he was one of the young German artists who died in the First World War.

== Life ==
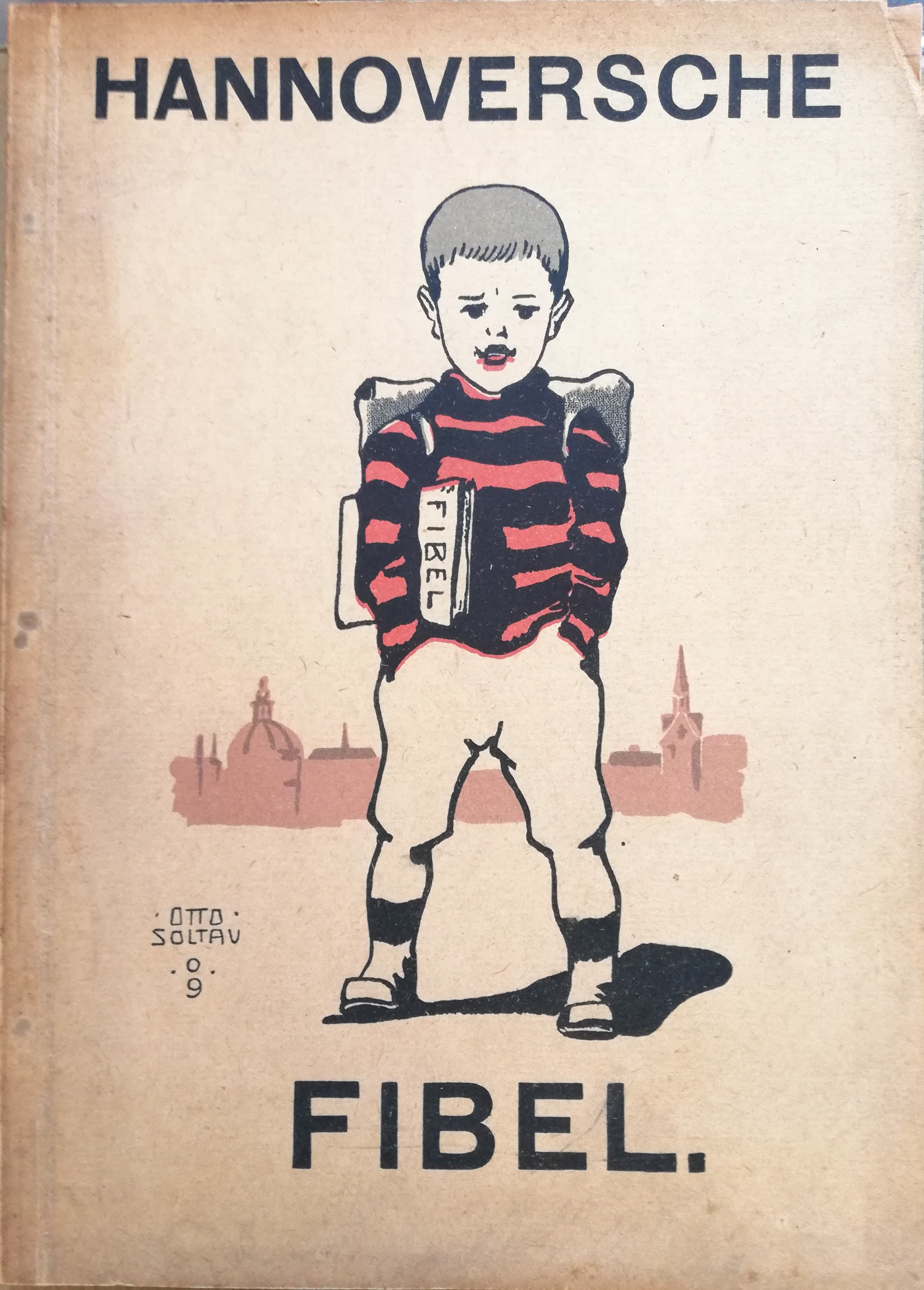
Hannoversche Fibel (Hanoverian primer) with a pupil in front of the silhouette of the city of Hanover, signed by Soltau; dated "09", 40th edition posthumously in 1920, publisher: Lehrerverein Hannover-Linden

Otto Soltau grew up in the former ferry house on today's "Neuer Damm" in Arnis – the house belonged to the captain Wilhelm Luth, the brother-in-law of Soltau's parents. The town of Arnis, which was affected by the decline of sailing ships at the time, tried to establish itself as a resort around 1900, which also led to a number of painters visiting the small town on the Schlei. He was inspired by one of these painters, a landscape painter from Hamburg, and at the age of 15 went to Hanover for an apprenticeship as a decoration apprentice. With a scholarship he was later able to study at the local arts and crafts school for a year.

Otto Soltau volunteered for military service during World War I. Like so many others, he saw war as an elemental force that attracted him. At the front he had to experience that in reality death is not as sublime as he had imagined in some of his works, but can be dirty and "hideous". In 1915 he was wounded during an officer training course on the Eastern Front and died shortly afterwards in Jarosław, Poland.

The family graves of Soltau and Luth families still stand on the Arniss cemetery today, not far from the entrance to the Schifferkirche. Otto Soltau is listed as one of the fallen in World War I on a memorial stone at the church. Since 2018, it has been possible to call up a spoken life story on a mobile phone using a QR code in the cemetery.

== Work ==
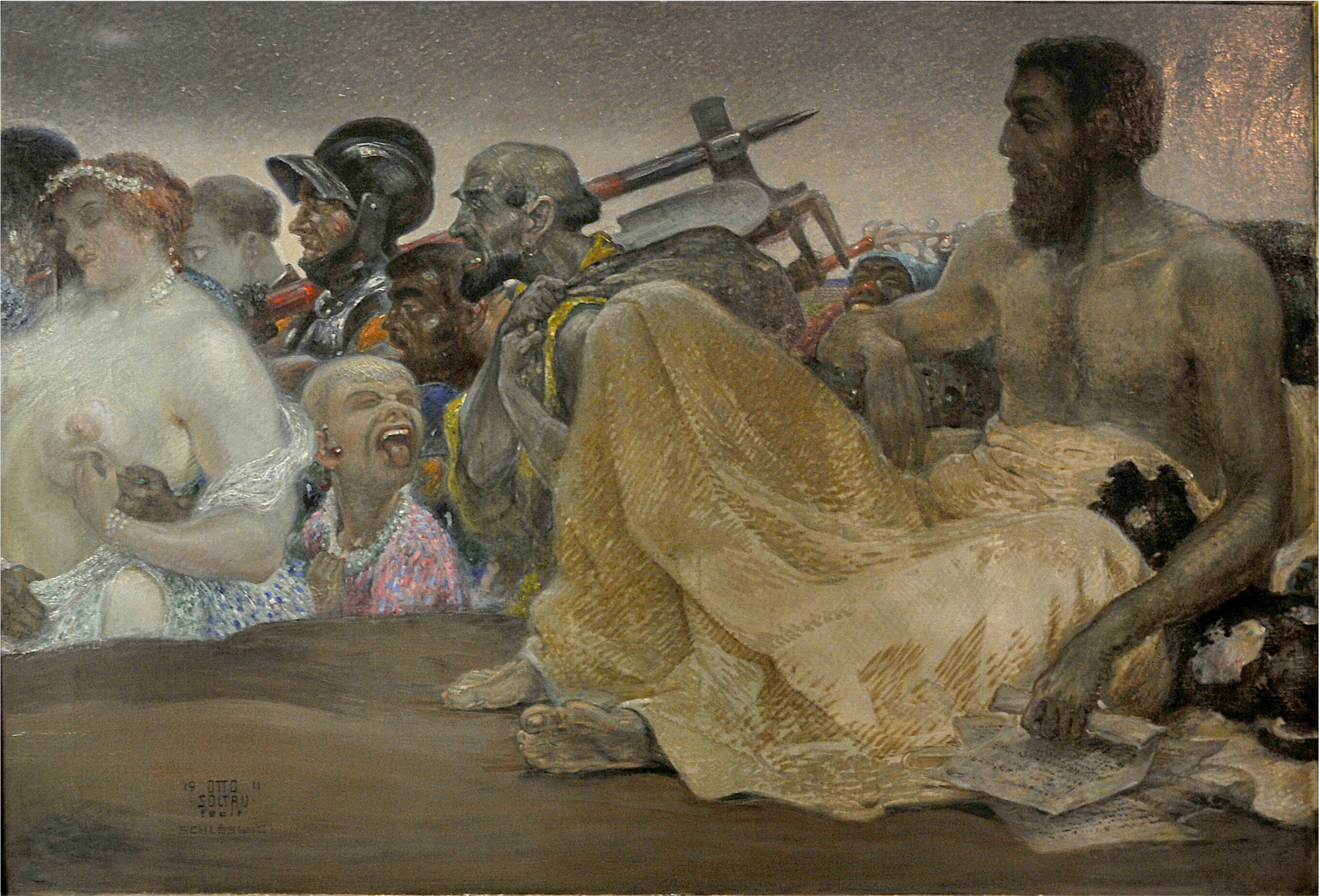
The Philosopher

At the beginning Soltau painted portraits as well as naturalistic animal pictures. In addition, he drew caricatures that mocked the military worship of the bourgeoisie, which was widespread at the time. From 1909 to 1912 he lived in Munich and turned to symbolist content in his painting, including: themes of antiquity and the Bible took up. The result was the painting The Centaur Playing with Her Child and the lithograph David (1910), which was distributed as a calendar sheet in 1913. After moving to Berlin, he concentrated on Nordic mythology, which he had already learned from the stories his mother told him in Arnis. The main reason for this reorientation was probably the contact with the folk-minded Karl Storck, a musicologist, and the writer Lulu von Strauss und Torney.

His most known work, a painting The Philosopher, today is in Gottorf Castle.

== Exhibition ==
- 2015: Verglühte Träume – Werke junger Künstler, Opfer des Ersten Weltkrieges, Museumsberg Flensburg

== Literature ==
- Dr. Friederike Weimar, Otto Soltau 1885 – 1915, in: Katalog zur Ausstellung Verglühte Träume, Berlin 2014, S. 69
- Nicolaus Schmidt, Otto Soltau, in: Nicolaus Schmidt, Arnis 1667–2017, Kiel 2017, S. 165f.
