= Soltau (river) =

River in Germany

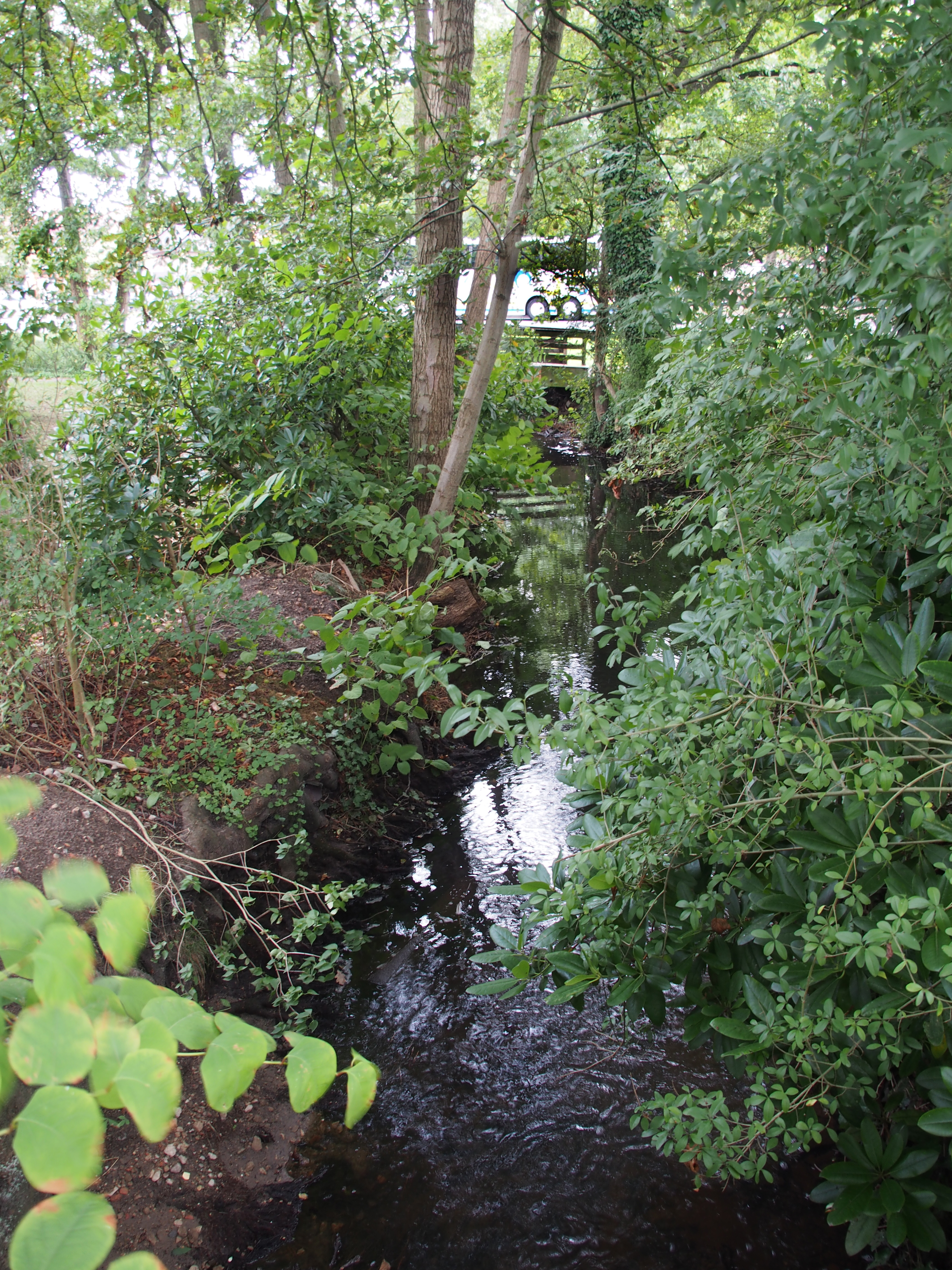
- The Soltau in the town Soltau

- Location in Lower Saxony

Location
- Country: Germany
- State: Lower Saxony

Physical characteristics
- Source
  - location: Becklinger Moor, north of Soltau
- Mouth
  - location: Böhme
  - coordinates: 52.9838°N 9.8406°E
- Length: 8 km (5.0 mi)

Basin features
- Progression: Böhme→ Aller→ Weser→ North Sea

The Soltau is a small river in the district of Heidekreis in Lower Saxony, Germany. It is a left-bank tributary of the Böhme and part of the Aller river system, draining approximately 180 km² of northern Lower Saxony.

== Course ==
The Soltau originates in the Becklinger Moor, a protected raised bog north of the town of Soltau. From its source at around 80 m above sea level, it flows generally south through agricultural and moorland landscapes before entering the urban area of Soltau at about 59 m elevation, where it joins the Böhme. Parts of its course in the city are straightened and channelized to manage flooding and urban development.

== Tributaries ==
Its main tributaries include:

- Alpe, a left-bank stream contributing to the catchment's drainage,
- Meinser Bach, which joins from the east and drains agricultural areas.

== Hydrology and basin ==
The Soltau River's catchment area of about 180 km² includes wetlands, forests, and farmland. It plays an important role in draining the southern part of the Becklinger Moor nature reserve. The moor is a remnant of the extensive bogs that once covered the Lüneburg Heath, formed during the Saale glaciation about 125,000 years ago. The area has been subject to drainage in the 19th and 20th centuries, but restoration projects since the 1960s and especially in the 2000s aim to raise water tables and protect bog habitats.

== Ecology and conservation ==
The river and its catchment include designated nature reserves:

- Becklinger Moor, a ~630 ha raised bog area under restoration,
- nearby moors such as Lührsbockeler Moor (~187 ha), featuring rare wetland species.

These moorlands support habitats for cranes, marsh harriers, dragonflies, and rare moth species. Restoration efforts involve blocking drainage ditches, rewetting peat soils, and monitoring biodiversity.

In 2020, the Heidekreis district issued regulations prohibiting boating on parts of the river to protect its ecological integrity and allow near-natural development.

== Water quality ==
The Soltau is classified as water quality class II (moderately polluted) under Lower Saxony monitoring programs, reflecting moderate nutrient loads from agriculture and settlements.

== See also ==
- List of rivers of Lower Saxony

== Sources ==
- "Flussgebietsbericht Aller". NLWKN.
- Müller, A. (2023). "Renaturierung von Moorlandschaften in Niedersachsen: Maßnahmen und Erfolge". Naturschutz und Landschaftsplanung. 55 (3): 120–127.
- Topographische Karte 1:25,000 (Map). Landesvermessung und Geobasisinformation Niedersachsen. 2024.
