= Kestnergesellschaft =

German art institution

Coordinates: 52°22′39″N 9°43′54″E

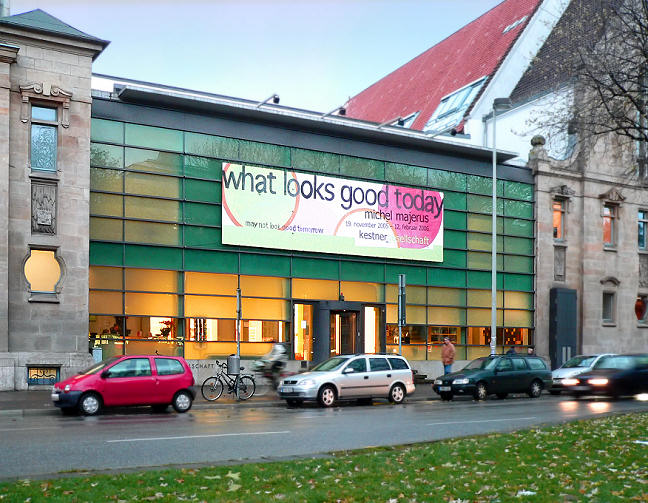
Kestnergesellschaft, art institution in Hanover

Kestner Gesellschaft (Kestner Society) is an art institution in Hanover, Germany, founded in 1916 to promote the arts. It is one of the largest art associations (German: Kunstvereine) in Germany. The halls of the Goseriedebad, which once housed an indoor swimming pool, regularly host extensive group and solo exhibitions.

== History ==
In 1916, with World War I raging, the Kestner Gesellschaft was founded by citizens of Hanover, among them Hermann Bahlsen, August Madsack and Fritz Beindorff. The new association was named after the Hanover diplomat, art historian, and archaeologist August Kestner (1777–1853). The aim of founding a second art association in Hanover was to keep pace with modernism and bring the international avant-garde to Hanover. Soon after it was founded, artists such as Wassily Kadinsky, El Lissitzky, Käthe Kollwitz, and Kurt Schwitters exhibited at the Kestner Gesellschaft.

Under the first director, Paul Küppers, and his wife Sophie Küppers, the Kestner Gesellschaft established itself as a place for cultural exchange. The first exhibition representing the starting point for this concept in 1916 consisted of Max Liebermann's new work. Küppers stated at the time that the aim was to present artworks which "do not simply function as a relaxing amusement but instead have a stimulating and – if necessary – provocative and scandalizing effect".

Alexander Dorner, who served as director from 1923 to 1924, also maintained close contacts with the international art scene. The influential exhibition organizer redefined the modern understanding of spaces for art and developed new ideas in art education.

In 1936, the Kestner Gesellschaft was closed under pressure from Hitler's Nazism. The director at the time, Justus Bier, a Jew, presented artists Erich Heckel, Gerhard Marcks, Christian Rohlfs and August Macke – artists who were featured in the notorious Degenerate Art exhibition in Munich only one year later. Soon after the war, the new Kestner Gesellschaft was opened in the Warmbüchenstraße in 1948 by Hanoverians with service to the public in mind, among them Hermann Bahlsen, Wilhelm Stichweh, Bernhard Sprengel and Günther Beindorff, the director of the company Pelikan.

After World War II, Alfred Hentzen took over the management in 1947, followed by Fritz Schmalenbach. The new beginning for the Kestner Gesellschaft was faced with major challenges: The former building at Königstrasse 8 was destroyed, and a new location had to be found. In 1948 it was possible to reopen the institution in the exhibition spaces on Warmbüchenstrasse. In the decades that followed, the Kestner Gesellschaft grew into an international player in the art scene, thanks to pioneering exhibitions with Pablo Picasso, Marcel Duchamp, Sol LeWitt, Eva Hesse, Andy Warhol, and Rebecca Horn, among others. In the early 1970s the facilities were greatly expanded, but soon even these exhibition spaces could no longer accommodate the art. Most importantly, the building lacked the technical infrastructure for modern exhibitions.

In 1997 the Kestner Gesellschaft moved to a Jugendstil building in the center of Hanover which once housed an indoor swimming pool. The building was renovated according to a design by the Hanover architects Koch Panse and was awarded the BDA Prize that same year. Since then, the Kestner Gesellschaft has shown contemporary art across over 1,300 square meters of exhibition space. There have been solo exhibitions by Thomas Ruff, Santiago Sierra, Barbara Kruger, Alex Katz, Karla Black, and Goshka Macuga, among others.

The institution hit the headlines in 2005 when it exhibited a mud house created by Spanish artist Santiago Sierra featuring a room with mud floor reminiscent of Hanover's Maschsee, an artificial lake.

From 2015 to 2019, institution’s first female director was Christina Végh. In 2017, the third edition of the collection Made in Germany, which is collectively curated on a five-year-cycle by the three institutions Kestner Gesellschaft, Kunstverein Hannover and Sprengel Museum Hannover, took place. Under the heading "Produktion. Made in Germany Three", the exhibition focused on the conditions of producing art in Germany. As participating institutions, the Schauspiel Hannover, the Festival Theaterformen, and the KunstFestSpiele are contributing the first time.

Adam Budak was the director of the Kestner Gesellschaft between 2020 and 2024. Budak developed a wide-ranging curatorial program centered on themes such as tenderness, anabasis, and amor mundi. His approach emphasized critical intimacy, performative space, and interdisciplinary dialogue. Highlights of his tenure include solo exhibitions by Roger Hiorns, Rebecca Ackroyd, Samson Young, Klára Hosnedlová, and Paula Rego, as well as group shows exploring the legacy of El Lissitzky and the political thought of Hannah Arendt. His directorship marked a period of increased international visibility for the institution, including its first participation in the Venice Biennale and the receipt of the Dezeen Architecture Award for the Paula Rego exhibition. Locally, Budak strengthened ties with Hannover’s cultural scene through partnerships with institutions such as the Staatsoper, Hochschule für Musik, Theater und Medien, and the Bund Bildender Künstlerinnen und Künstler. He also initiated structural and social innovations, including the Café Tender Buttons, a curated Bookshop, the Cinémathèque helping to open the institution to a broader and more diverse public.

Eva Birkenstock is the new Director from August 2025.

The list of artists whose works have been exhibited during the 75-year history – excluding the years of closure – reads like a "Who's Who" in the history of 20th- and 21st-century art, among them Paul Klee (1920), Wassily Kandinsky (1923), El Lissitzky (1923) and Kurt Schwitters (1924), both friends of the Kestner Gesellschaft, Joan Miró (1952, 1956, 1989), Jean Dubuffet (1960), Marcel Duchamp and Horst Janssen (1965), Pablo Picasso (1973, 1993), Wolf Vostell (1977), Andy Warhol (1981 as his first retrospective in Germany, 2001) Jean-Michel Basquiat (1986 as the youngest at age 25, 1989), Georg Baselitz (1987), Joseph Beuys (1975, 1990), Richard Prince (1991), Rebecca Horn (1978, 1991, 1997), Antoni Tàpies (1962, 1998), Jonathan Meese (2002), Thomas Ruff (2003), Peter Doig (2004), Rochelle Feinstein, (2016/17), James Richards, (2016/17) and Annette Kelm (2017).

== Kestner Gesellschaft at the Goseriede ==
=== The House ===
In 1997, the Prime Minister of Lower Saxony, Gerhard Schröder, inaugurated the new facilities of the Kestner Gesellschaft at Goseriede 11. Simultaneously, the Munich Abendzeitung declared the remodelled exhibition facility "Germany’s most beautiful exhibition house." The remodelling of the former Goseriede Aquatic Center into an up-to-date exhibition house not only incorporates the high technical demands of modern exhibition operations but also preserves and showcases the Jugendstil features of this historic landmark. With its five halls on two levels, the house has at its command more than 1,500 square meters of exhibition surface.

=== History of the House ===
From 1902 to 1905 the Hanoverian chief city architectural commissioner, Carl Wolff, oversaw the construction of the Goseriede Aquatic Center. The middle section of the public bathing facility was destroyed in 1943 during the Second World War, and later rebuilt from 1947 to 1953. After the reopening, the pool remained in use until 1982. In the same year, the city placed the beautiful Jugendstil façade under protection as a monument. In 1990 the Madsack publishing company purchased the building, offering the sections of the former women's pool area, entrance hall and all adjoining rooms to the Kestner Gesellschaft for its use. An international architectural competition was launched in 1992 in search of an innovative design for the space with the support of the Norddeutsche Landesbank. Chaired by Prof. Peter P. Schweger, the jury awarded the first prize to the Hanoverian architects Kai-Michael Koch, Anne Panse and Christian Hühn. In collaboration with the curators of the Kestner Gesellschaft, their design was developed further into an elegant and dynamic amalgamation of modern architectural elements. The prize of the Association of German Architects of the State of Lower Saxony was awarded to the building in 1998.

=== Exhibition spaces ===
Each of the five halls at Kestner Gesellschaft has its own unique dimensions and atmosphere. Able to accommodate diverse exhibition concepts, the spaces can be transformed with high-tech equipment including a close-meshed and invisible network of electrical connections in the floors, walls and ceilings. The lateral galleries in the Halls II and III can be closed off to create smaller exhibition spaces. The total of twelve entrances into the Claussen Hall may be used to create different orientations of projects and viewers. In planning for the building renovations, care was also taken to create the necessary infrastructure for the careful transport and handling of artworks to and within the halls, with direct access to the exhibition spaces via loading dock. Due to ceiling-high gates on the ground- and upper-floors along with a large elevator, pieces arrive safely and easily into the exhibition halls.

== Kestnereditions ==
Since 2003, Kestnereditions are being released related to every exhibition. The works, which include graphic art, photography and other art forms, are offered exclusively for members of the Kestner Gesellschaft in limited editions.

== Exhibitions until 1936 ==
Artist	First exhibited year	Add'l exhibited years
Theodor Alt	1922	
Eduard Arnthal	1921	
Hans Arp	1924	
Ernst Barlach	1918	1919, 1931
Max Beckmann	1918	1919, 1931
René Beeh	1921	
Herman Bieling	1922	
Alf Björn	1925	
Albert Bloch	1921	
Walter Bondy	1925	
Theo von Brockhusen	1918	1919
Max Burchartz	1921	1923
Erich Büttner	1918	1919
Karl Caspar	1916	
Theo Champion	1925	
Lovis Corinth	1917	1928
Elisabet Delbrück	1924	
Otto Dix	1927	
Kees van Dongen	1922	
Bernhard Dörries	1926	
Hans Düne	1924	
Josef Eberz	1917	
James Ensor	1927	
Adolf Falke	1924	
Lyonel Feininger	1919	1924–25, 1932
Conrad Felixmüller	1921	
Margarete Fischer-Bayer	1925	
Naum Gabo	1930	
Gerlwh (Gerardus Ladage)	1922	
Vincent van Gogh	1928	
Walter Gropius	1931	
George Grosz	1921	
Erich Heckel	1919	1935
Franz Heckendorf	1918	
August Heitmüller	1921	1922
Ferdinand Hodler	1925	
Carl Hofer	1925	1927
Adolf Hölzel	1918	
Willy Jaeckel	1916	1917
Alexey von Jawlensky	1920	1924
Wassily Kandinsky	1923	
Fred Kayser	1924	
Paul Klee	1919	1931
César Klein	1918	
Linda Kögel	1924	
Wilhelm Kohlhoff	1919	
Oskar Kokoschka	1925	
Georg Kolbe	1933	
Käthe Kollwitz	1929	
Bruno Krauskopf	1919	
Alfred Kubin	1930	
Wilhelm Lehmbruck	1920	
Max Liebermann	1916	
El Lissitzky	1923	
Adrian Lubbers	1925	
August Macke	1918	1925, 1935
Franz Marc	1931	1936
Gerhard Marcks	1936	
Frans Masereel	1926	1931
Ludwig Meidner	1918	
Moritz Melzer	1920	
Gerd Meyer	1924	
Paula Modersohn-Becker	1917	1922, 1934
László Moholy-Nagy	1923	
Wilhelm Morgner	1922	
Edvard Munch	1929	
Heinrich Nauen	1918	
Emil Nolde	1918	1922, 1924, 1928, 1934
Max Pechstein	1922	
Pablo Picasso	1932	
Pierre-Auguste Renoir	1925	
Paul Riess	1925	
Auguste Rodin	1925	
Emy Roeder	1922	
Christian Rohlfs	1919	1924, 1930, 1936
Wolf Röhricht	1921	
Josef Scharl	1933	
Oskar Schlemmer	1932	
Karl Schmidt-Rottluff	1920	1923
Carl Moritz Schreiner	1922	
Otto Schulze	1919	
Kurt Schwitters	1917	1918, 1924
Götz von Seckendorff	1919	
Max Slevogt	1932	1934
Milly Steger	1922	
Käthe Steinitz	1922	
Stanislaus Stückgold	1917	
Ernst Thoms	1926	
Henri de Toulouse-Lautrec	1925	
Wilhelm Trübner	1917	
Albert Weisgerber	1917	
Emil Rudolf Weiß	1917	
Konrad Westermayr	1920	
Rudolf Wolke	1917	
Heinrich Zille	1931	
Leni Zimmermann-Heitmüller	1921	1922

== Exhibitions from 1948 until 1995 ==
- Emil Nolde 1948
- Pablo Picasso 1949, 1965, 1979, 1994
- Max Beckmann 1949
- Werner Gilles 1949
- Gerhard Marcks 1949
- Fernand Léger 1949
- Fritz Winter 1951
- Walter Gropius 1951
- Marino Marini 1952
- Werner Gilles 952
- Alexander Camaro 1952
- Joan Miró 1952, 1958, 1990
- Ewald Mataré 1952
- Hans Uhlmann 1953
- Erich Heckel 1953
- Karl Hartung 1953
- Henry Moore 1953
- Eduard Bargheer 1953
- Emy Roeder 1953
- Fritz Grasshoff 1954
- Saul Steinberg 1954
- Hans Arp 1955
- André Masson 1955
- Marc Chagall 1955, 1985
- K.R.H. Sonderborg 1956
- Hans Hartung 1957
- Gustave Singier 1957
- Theo Eble 1958
- Maria Elena Vieira da Silva 1958
- Bruno Goller 1958
- Jean-Paul Riopelle 1958
- Julius Bissier 1958
- Alfred Manessier 1959
- Ben Nicholson 1959
- Woty Werner 1959
- Hann Trier 1959
- Kenneth Armitage 1960
- William Scott 1960
- Hans Reichel 1960
- Jean Dubuffet 1960
- Pierre Soulages 1961
- Etienne Hajdu 1961
- Joseph Fassbender 1961
- Emil Schumacher 1961
- Victor Pasmore 1962
- Edwin Scharff 1962
- Jean Bazaine 1963
- Zoltan Kemeny 1963
- Sam Francis 1963
- Serge Poliakoff 1963
- Kumi Sugai 1963
- Gregory Masurovsky 1963
- Victor Vasarely 1964
- Paul Jenkins 1964
- Heinz Battke 1964
- Hundertwasser 1964
- Richard Oelze 1964
- Alfred Kubin 1964
- Paul Eliasberg 1965
- Victor Brauner 1965
- Horst Janssen 1965
- Bernard Schultze 1966
- Mark Tobey 1966
- Alberto Giacometti 1966
- Konrad Klapheck 1966
- Wifredo Lam 1966
- Joannis Avramidis 1967
- Ben Nicholson 1967
- Pierre Roy 1967
- Hans Bellmer 1967
- Rupprecht Geiger 1967
- Auguste Herbin 1967
- Fritz Wotruba 1967
- Alan Davie 1968
- Lucio Fontana 1968
- Antonio Calderara 1968
- Roy Lichtenstein 1968
- Domenico Gnoli 1968
- Josef Albers 1968
- Max Bill 1968
- Almir Mavignier 1968
- René Magritte 1969
- Miguel Berrocal 1969
- Gotthard Graubner 1969
- Graham Sutherland 1970
- R. B. Kitaj 1970
- Jim Dine 1970
- Giorgio de Chirico 1970
- Pol Bury 1972
- Jean Tinguely 1972
- Günther Uecker 1972
- Marcello Morandini 1972
- Tomi Ungerer 1973
- Joseph Cornell 1973
- Alfred Jensen 1973
- Josef Albers 1973
- Horst Janssen 1973
- Jorge Castillo 1973
- George Rickey 1973
- Michelangelo Pistoletto 1974
- Gisela Andersch 1974
- Walter Dexel 1974
- Uwe Bremer 1974
- Alfred Hrdlicka 1974
- Dieter Roth 1974
- Roberto Matta 1974
- Peter Ackermann 1974
- André Thomkins 1974
- Eduardo Paolozzi 1975
- Bernhard Luginbühl 1975
- Saul Steinberg 1975
- Joseph Beuys 1976, 1990
- Cy Twombly 1976
- Claes Oldenburg 1976
- Arnulf Rainer 1977
- Wolf Vostell 1977
- Jochen Gerz 1978
- Rebecca Horn 1978, 1991
- Eva Hesse 1979
- Howard Kanovitz 1980
- Pierre Alechinsky 1980
- Larry Rivers 1981
- Raoul Hausmann 1981
- Mimmo Paladino 1981
- Andy Warhol 1981
- Egon Schiele 1982
- Mario Merz 1982
- Adolf Hölzel 1982
- Peter Blake 1983
- Markus Lüpertz 1983
- Hans Bellmer 1984
- Howard Hodgkin 1985
- Christian Ludwig Attersee 1985
- Tony Cragg 1986
- Jean-Charles Blais 1986
- Benjamin Katz 1986
- Jean-Michel Basquiat 1986
- Martin Disler 1987
- Fred Sandback 1987
- Georg Baselitz 1987
- George Grosz 1988
- Jakob Mattner 1988
- A.R. Penck 1988
- Sol LeWitt 1989
- John Baldessari 1989
- Astrid Klein 1989
- Bernhard Minetti 1989
- Jean-Michel Basquiat 1989
- Richard Hamilton 1990
- Klaus vom Bruch 1990
- Jannis Kounellis 1991
- Robert Wilson 1991
- Per Kirkeby 1992
- David Tremlett 1992
- Eugen Schönebeck 1992
- Thomas Huber 1993
- Richard Prince 1994

== Exhibitions since 1997 ==
- Rebecca Horn 1997
- Antoni Tàpies 1998
- Andy Warhol 2001
- Jonathan Meese 2002
- Thomas Ruff 2003
- Peter Doig 2004
- Peter Fischli and David Weiss 2004
- Miquel Barceló 2004
- Cindy Sherman 2004
- Santiago Sierra 2005
- Gilbert & George 2005
- Sarah Morris 2005
- Candida Höfer 2005
- Michel Majerus 2005
- Erik Bulatov 2006
- Thomas Hirschhorn 2006
- Bazon Brock 2006
- Chris Ofili 2006
- Barbara Kruger 2006
- Franz Ackermann 2006
- Wolfgang Tillmans 2007
- Raymond Pettibon 2007
- Bruce Nauman 2007
- Eric Fischl 2007
- Bettina Rheims 2007
- Araki Meets Hokusai 2008
- Helmut Lang 2008
- Jake and Dinos Chapman 2008
- David Salle 2009
- Michaël Borremans 2009
- Phoebe Washburn 2009
- Gert and Uwe Tobias 2009
- Elke Krystufek 2009
- Aaron Curry 2010
- Bethan Huws 2010
- Alicja Kwade 2010
- Larry Sultan 2010
- Olaf Nicolai 2010
- Cecily Brown 2010
- Nathalie Djurberg 2010
- Michael Sailstorfer 2010
- Joachim Koester 2010
- Julian Göthe 2011
- David LaChapelle 2011
- André Butzer 2011
- Jos de Gruyter and Harald Thys 2011
- Daniel Richter 2011
- Alice Springs 2011
- Alex Katz 2011
- Andy Hope 1930 2012
- Monica Baer 2016
- Rochelle Feinstein 2016/17
- James Richards 2016/17
- Annette Kelm 2017
- Marc Camille Chaimowicz 2017/18

== Literature ==
- Wieland Schmied: Wegbereiter zur modernen Kunst – 50 Jahre Kestner-Gesellschaft. Hannover 1966.
- Ines Katenhusen: Kunst und Politik. Hannovers Auseinandersetzungen mit der Moderne in der Weimarer Republik. Hahn, Hannover 1998, ISBN 3-7752-4955-9.
- Veit Görner: Kestnerchronik. Buch 1, Hannover 2006, Buch 2, Hannover 2009.
