= Günter Fruhtrunk =

German painter

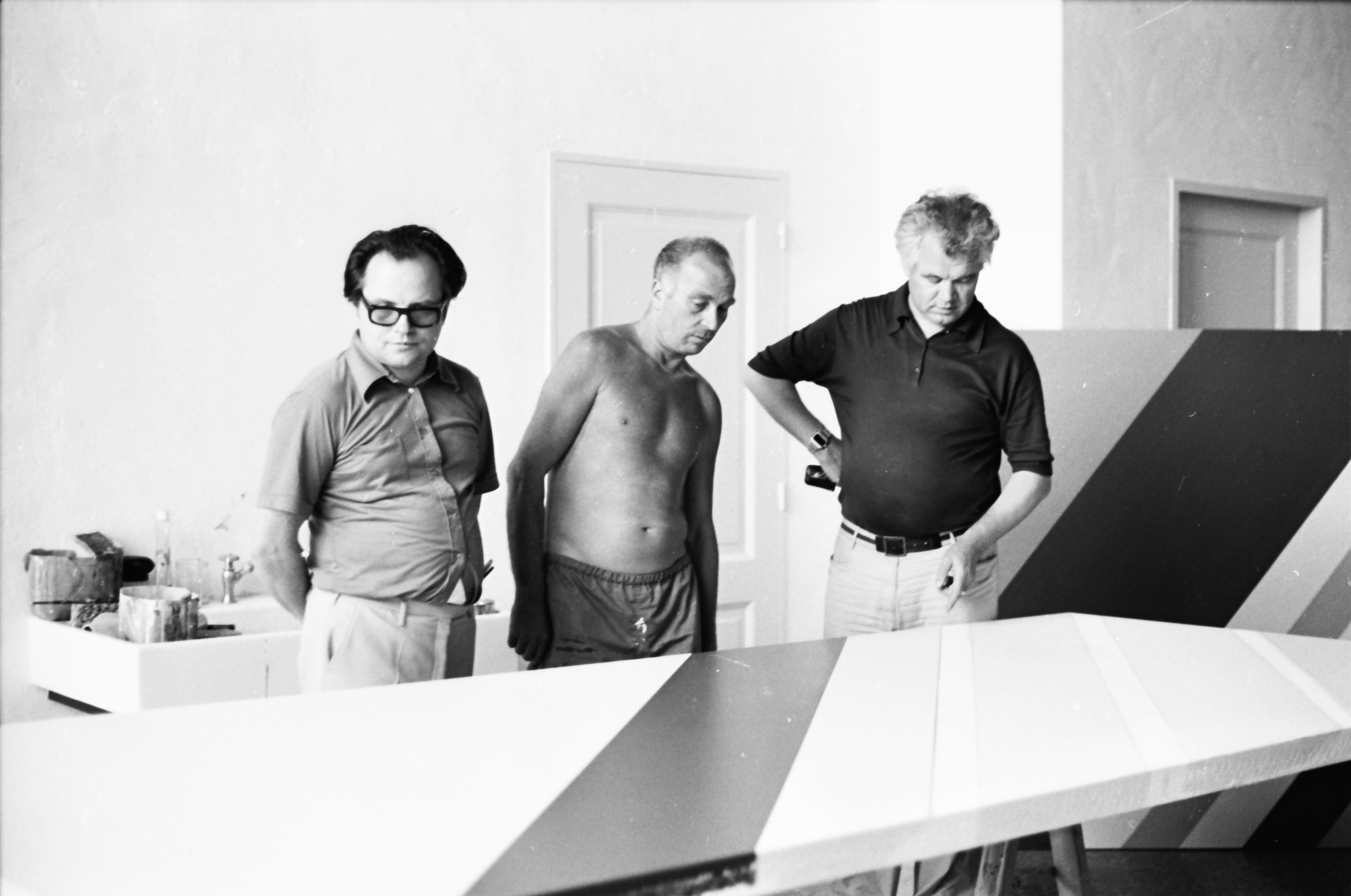
Günther Frühtrunk in 1975

Günter Fruhtrunk (1 May 1923 – 12 December 1982) was a German geometric abstract painter and printmaker whose work relates to op art.

Born in Munich, Fruhtrunk studied architecture at the Technische Hochschule in Munich, which he gave up after two semesters to join the army as a volunteer in the fall of 1941. In 1945, Fruhtrunk began to study privately under the painter and printmaker William Straube in Neufrach, who was a student of Adolf Hölzel and Henri Matisse. In 1954 he received a scholarship from the state Baden-Württemberg and the French government and moved to Paris to work in the studios of Fernand Léger and Jean Arp. During the 1960s the painter mainly lived and worked in France. In 1961 he received the Prix Jean Arp in Cologne and in 1966 he was awarded the silver medal of the Prix d'Europe for Painting in Ostende. In 1963 he appeared in the film documentary School of Paris: (5 Artists at Work) by American filmmaker Warren Forma. In 1967, Fruhtrunk began teaching at the Academy of Fine Arts, Munich. It was Fruhtrunk who transformed the ideas of Constructivism to a colorful rhythmical pictorial world, by creating a dynamic language of form with vector-like diagonal lines arranged strictly rhythmically according to their alternating colors. His most conspicuous work was the plastic shopping bag he designed in the early 1970s for Aldi Nord; its use was discontinued in late 2018.

Fruhtrunk committed suicide at the age of 59 in his studio on 12 December 1982.

== Notable exhibitions ==
- 1960 – Galerie Denise René, Paris, France (solo)
- 1963 – Museum am Ostwall, Dortmund, Germany (solo)
- 1968 – 34th Venice Biennale, Venice, Italy
- 1968 – 4. documenta, Kassel, Germany
- 1970 – Museum Ludwig, Köln, Germany
- 1970 – Musée d'Art Moderne de la Ville de Paris, France (solo)
- 1973 – Museum Bochum, Germany (solo)
- 1993 - Günter Fruhtrunk, Retrospective, Neue Nationalgalerie, Berlin, Germany / Westphalian State Museum of Art and Cultural History, Münster, Germany / Lenbachhaus, Munich, Germany (solo)
- 2002 – Günter Fruhtrunk – Rhythme dynamic Stripes, Arithmeum, Bonn, Germany
- 2005 – Progressives Museum Basel, Haus Konstruktiv, Zurich, Switzerland
- 2006 – Conversation with Art, on Art, Bauhaus to Contemporary Art, Tokyo Opera City Art Gallery, Tokyo, Japan
- 2007 – Da Bauhaus (Agora!), Museu de Arte de São Paulo, Brazil
- 2009 – Alles – Wilhelm Hack Museum, Ludwigshafen, Germany
- 2010 – Ein konkreter Maler, Lorenzelli Arte, Milan, Italy (solo)
- 2011 – The Erling Neby Collection. Henie Onstad Kunstsenter, Høvikodden, Norway
- 2012 – Günter Fruhtrunk: Paint, Rhythm, Existence, Kunstmuseum Liechtenstein, Vaduz, Liechtenstein (solo)
- 2013 – Günter Fruhtrunk: La peinture vivante, Cambrai Museum, Cambrai, France (solo)
- 2023 – Günter Fruhtrunk, The Paris Years (1954–1967), Lenbachhaus, Munich, Germany (solo)
- 2023/2024 - Günter Fruhtrunk, Retrospective 1952 - 1982, Kunstmuseum Bonn, Bonn, Germany / Museum Wiesbaden, Wiesbaden, Germany (solo)
