= 4. documenta =

1968 art exhibition in Kassel, West Germany

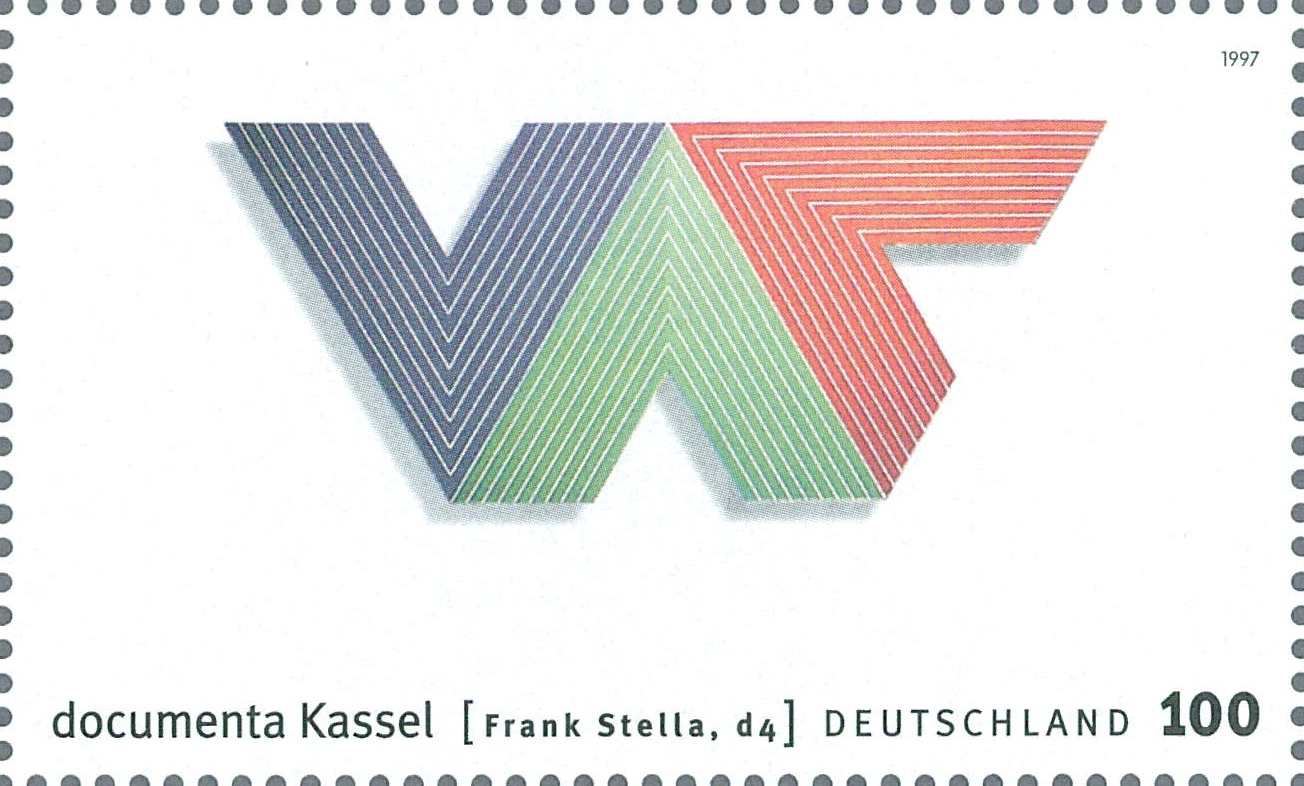
stamp Frank Stella d4 1997

4. documenta was the fourth edition of documenta, a quinquennial contemporary art exhibition. It was held between 27 June and 6 October 1968 in Kassel, West Germany. The artistic director was 24-strong documenta council and Arnold Bode.

== Participants ==
A
Josef Albers	Getulio Alviani	Carl Andre	Horst Antes	Richard Anuszkiewicz
Shusaku Arakawa	Arman	Richard Artschwager
B
Jo Baer	Larry Bell	Ben Berns	Joseph Beuys	Ronald Bladen
Peter Brüning	Pol Bury	Bazon Brock
C
Antonio Calderara	Sérgio de Camargo	Anthony Caro	Enrico Castellani	Jorge Castillo
César	Eduardo Chillida	Christo and Jeanne-Claude	Chryssa
Gianni Colombo	Joseph Cornell
D
Ron Davis	Ad Dekkers	Hugo Demarco	Burgoyne Diller	Jim Dine
Mark di Suvero	Milan Dobeš	Jean Dubuffet
E
Pieter Engels	John Ernest
F
Öyvind Fahlström	Dan Flavin	Lucio Fontana	Günter Fruhtrunk
G
Rupprecht Geiger	Klaus Geldmacher	Karl Gerstner	Domenico Gnoli	Roland Goeschl
Daan van Golden	Gerhard von Graevenitz	Gotthard Graubner
H
Raymond Hains	Richard Hamilton	Erich Hauser	Erwin Heerich	Al Held
Edward Higgins	Anthony Hill	David Hockney	John Hoyland
I
Robert Indiana
J
Alain Jacquet	Alfred Jensen	Jasper Johns	Allen Jones	Donald Judd
K
Menashe Kadishman	Utz Kampmann	Ellsworth Kelly	Edward Kienholz	Phillip King
R. B. Kitaj	Konrad Klapheck	Yves Klein	Jiří Kolář	Gyula Kosice
Nicholas Krushenick
L
Thomas Lenk	Julio Le Parc	Sol LeWitt	Roy Lichtenstein	Richard Lindner
Richard Paul Lohse	Francesco Lo Savio	Morris Louis
M
Robert Malaval	Jos Manders	Piero Manzoni	Enzo Mari	Walter De Maria
Francesco Mariotti	Marisol Escobar	Kenneth Martin	Almir Mavignier	Christian Megert
François Morellet	Robert Morris	Bruno Munari
N
Bruce Nauman	Edgar Negret	Louise Nevelson	Barnett Newman	Kenneth Noland
Lev Nussberg	Constant Nieuwenhuys
O
Claes Oldenburg	Jules Olitski
P
Eduardo Paolozzi	Walter Pichler	Michelangelo Pistoletto	Larry Poons
R
Markus Raetz	Ramon Aguilella Cueco	Robert Rauschenberg	Roger Raveel	Martial Raysse
Josua Reichert	Ad Reinhardt	George Rickey	Bridget Riley	Larry Rivers
James Rosenquist	Dieter Roth
S
Lucas Samaras	Michael Sandle	Jan Schoonhoven	George Segal	Dan Van Severen
David Smith	Richard Smith	Tony Smith	Robert Stanley	Frank Stella
Zdeněk Sýkora
T
Shinkichi Tajiri	Takis	Paul Talman	Antoni Tàpies	Hervé Télémaque
Paul Thek	Joe Tilson	Jean Tinguely	Ernest Trova	William G. Tucker
William Turnbull	Michael Tyzack
U
Günther Uecker	Per Olof Ultvedt
V
Victor Vasarely	Carel Visser	Jan Voss
W
Andy Warhol	Tom Wesselmann	H. C. Westermann
