= Rochelle Feinstein =

American artist

- Born: 1947 (age 78–79); Bronx, NY, United States
- Education: University of Minnesota (MFA, 1978); Pratt Institute (BFA, 1975)
- Known for: painting, prints, installation
- Awards: American Academy of Arts and Letters Art Purchase Prize; Anonymous Was A Woman Award; Guggenheim Fellowship; Joan Mitchell Foundation Grant
- Website: http://rochellefeinstein.com

Rochelle Feinstein (born 1947, Bronx, NY) is a contemporary American visual artist who makes abstract paintings, prints, video, sculpture, and installations that explore language and contemporary culture. She was appointed professor in painting and printmaking at the Yale School of Art in 1994, where she also served as director of graduate studies, until becoming professor emerita in 2017.

In 2018, the Bronx Museum held the first comprehensive survey of her work in the United States, Rochelle Feinstein: Image of an Image, which traveled there from three European venues: the Centre d'Art Contemporain Genève, Switzerland (2016), Städtische Galerie im Lenbachhaus, Munich (2016), and kestnergesellschaft, Hannover (2017).

Feinstein currently lives and works in New York City and is represented by Francesca Pia, Zurich and Campoli Presti, London/Paris.

== Early life and education ==
Feinstein received her BFA from Pratt Institute (1975) and her MFA from The University of Minnesota (1978).

Feinstein taught at Bennington College from 1980 through 1994, when she was appointed Professor of Painting and Printmaking at the Yale School of Art. She was one of the first women to be granted tenure at Yale University in the Visual Arts. Feinstein has been making paintings, photographs, videos, and installations for over 30 years.

== Work ==
Feinstein's work cannot be easily categorized, due to the way she employs various styles and mediums including "silkscreen, photography and assemblage, hard-edged graphic compositions as well as expressionist factures" always seeming to respond with wit and bite to contemporary American culture. Rose Courteau wrote in the New York Times that her work "is known for its unpredictability and ironic allusions to pop culture and art history."

== Selected exhibitions ==
Most notably Feinstein's work was included in the 2014 Whitney Biennial at the Whitney Museum of American Art and in 2018, the first retrospective of her work in the United States, Rochelle Feinstein: Image of an Image, was shown at The Bronx Museum of the Arts, in New York City. In Anticipation of Women's History Month at The Centre d'Art Contemporain Genève (2016) was the first iteration of Image of an Image, which traveled to Städtische Galerie im Lenbachhaus, Munich (2016) and kestnergesellschaft, Hannover (2017).

Recent solo exhibitions include On Stellar Rays, New York, NY (2014/2013/2011); Higher Pictures, New York, NY (2013); Art Production Fund, New York, NY (2009); Momenta Art, Brooklyn, NY (2008); The Suburban, Chicago, IL (2008).

Recent group exhibitions include Contemporary Art Museum St. Louis, St. Louis MO (2015); The Green Gallery, Milwaukee, WI (2015); University of South Florida Contemporary Art Museum, Tampa, FL (2014); Silberkuppe, Berlin (2014); Martos Gallery, New York, NY (2014); 32 Edgewood Gallery, Yale School of Art, New Haven, CT (2014); New Galerie, Paris, France (2012); Soloway, Brooklyn, NY (2013, 2012); Fredericks & Freiser, New York, NY (2012); International Print Center, New York, NY (2012); White Flag, St. Louis, MO (2011); Blanton Museum of Art, Austin, TX (2010).

Feinstein's work was included in various faculty exhibitions at Bennington College.

== Awards and residencies ==
Feinstein has been awarded a number of grants, residencies and awards, including a Guggenheim Fellowship (1996), an Anonymous Was a Woman Award, a Louis Comfort Tiffany Foundation Fellowship, the Radcliffe Institute for Advanced Study Fellowship (2012–13), a Joan Mitchell Foundation Painters and Sculptors grant, and a Foundation for Contemporary Arts grant (1999).

== Collections ==
Feinstein's work is included in numerous prominent museum and private collections including the Museum of Modern Art, New York and the Pérez Art Museum Miami (PAMM).
