= Reg Butler =

English sculptor

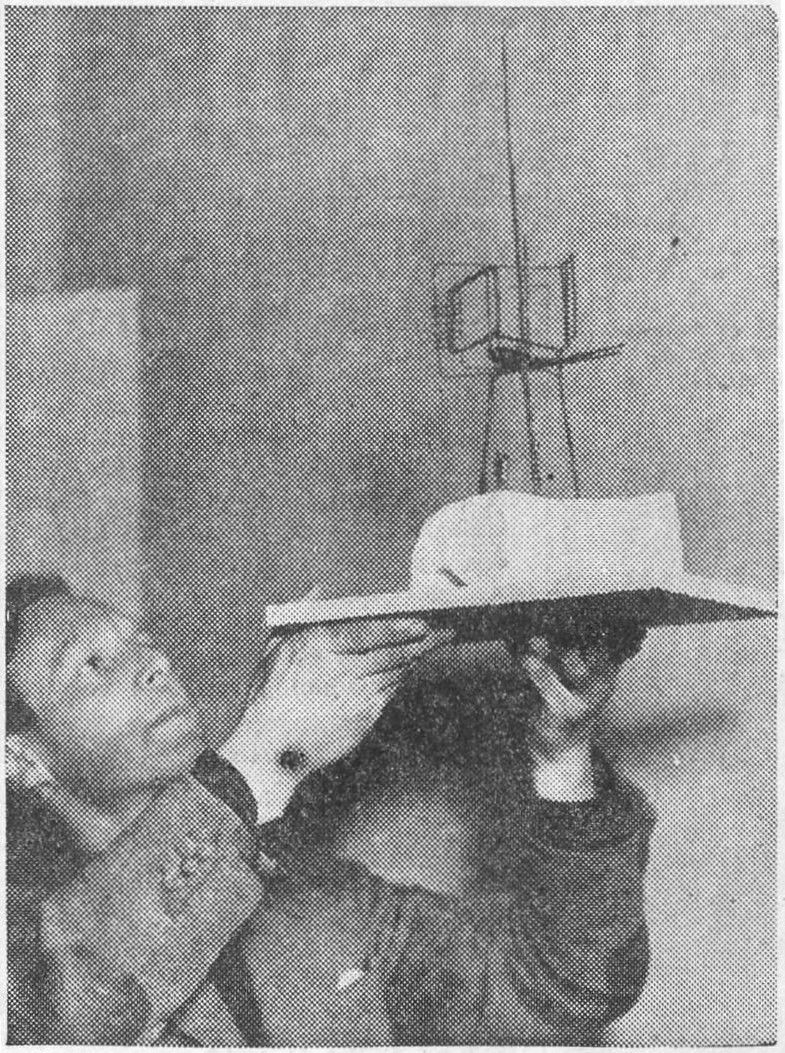
Portrait of sculptor Reg Butler, 153

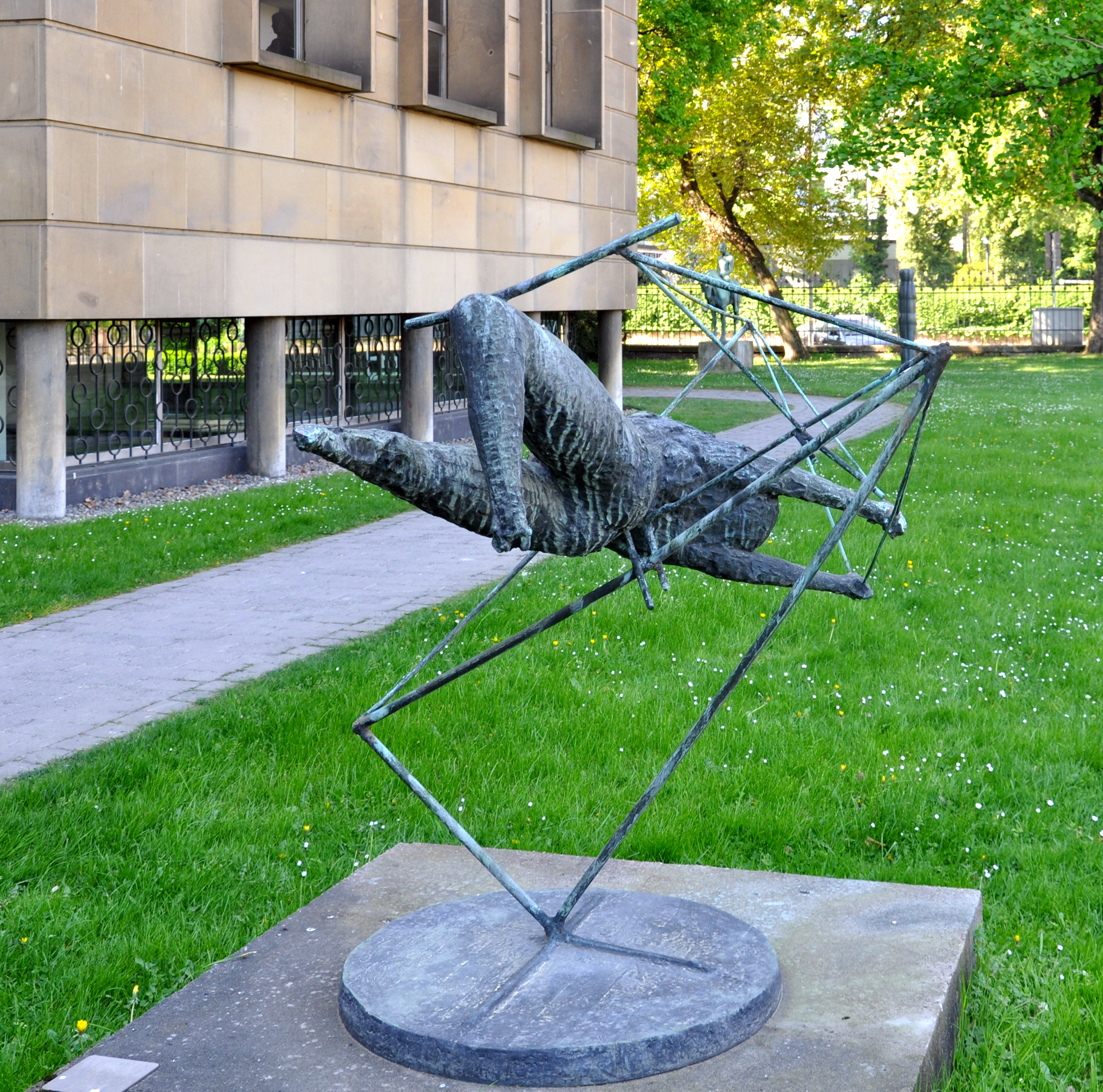
Reg Butler sculpture in Frankfurt

Reginald Cotterell Butler (28 April 1913 – 23 October 1981) was an English sculptor. He was born at Bridgefoot House, Buntingford, Hertfordshire to Frederick William Butler (1880–1937) and Edith (1880–1969), daughter of blacksmith William Barltrop, of The Forge, Takeley, Essex. His parents were the Master and Matron of the Buntingford Union Workhouse. Frederick Butler, formerly a police constable, was a relative of the poet William Butler Yeats; Edith was of Anglo-French descent.

Butler studied and lectured at the Architectural Association School of Architecture in London from 1937 to 1939. He was a conscientious objector during the Second World War, being exempted from military service conditional upon setting up a small blacksmith business repairing farm implements. After winning the 'Unknown Political Prisoner' competition in 1953 he became one of the best known sculptors during the 1950s and 1960s, and also taught at the Slade School of Art.

Butler's later work consists of lifelike models of female figures, such as Girl on a Round Base, that have something in common with Hans Bellmer and the sculpture of Allen Jones and prefigure the work of Ron Mueck.

Many of his works are held by the Museum of Modern Art in New York City and Tate Gallery in London.

Butler was featured in the 1964 documentary film, "5 British Sculptors (Work and Talk)", by American filmmaker Warren Forma.

Butler married Joan Child in 1938; by his second wife, Rosemary (née Young; 1930–2019), a sculptor, who had been his student and later assistant, he had a son, Creon Adrian John Cotterell Butler, later a diplomat, and daughter, Cortina Maxine Ann Cotterell Butler, a director of literature for the British Council.

He died in Berkhamsted.
