= Swamp Legend =

Painting by Paul Klee

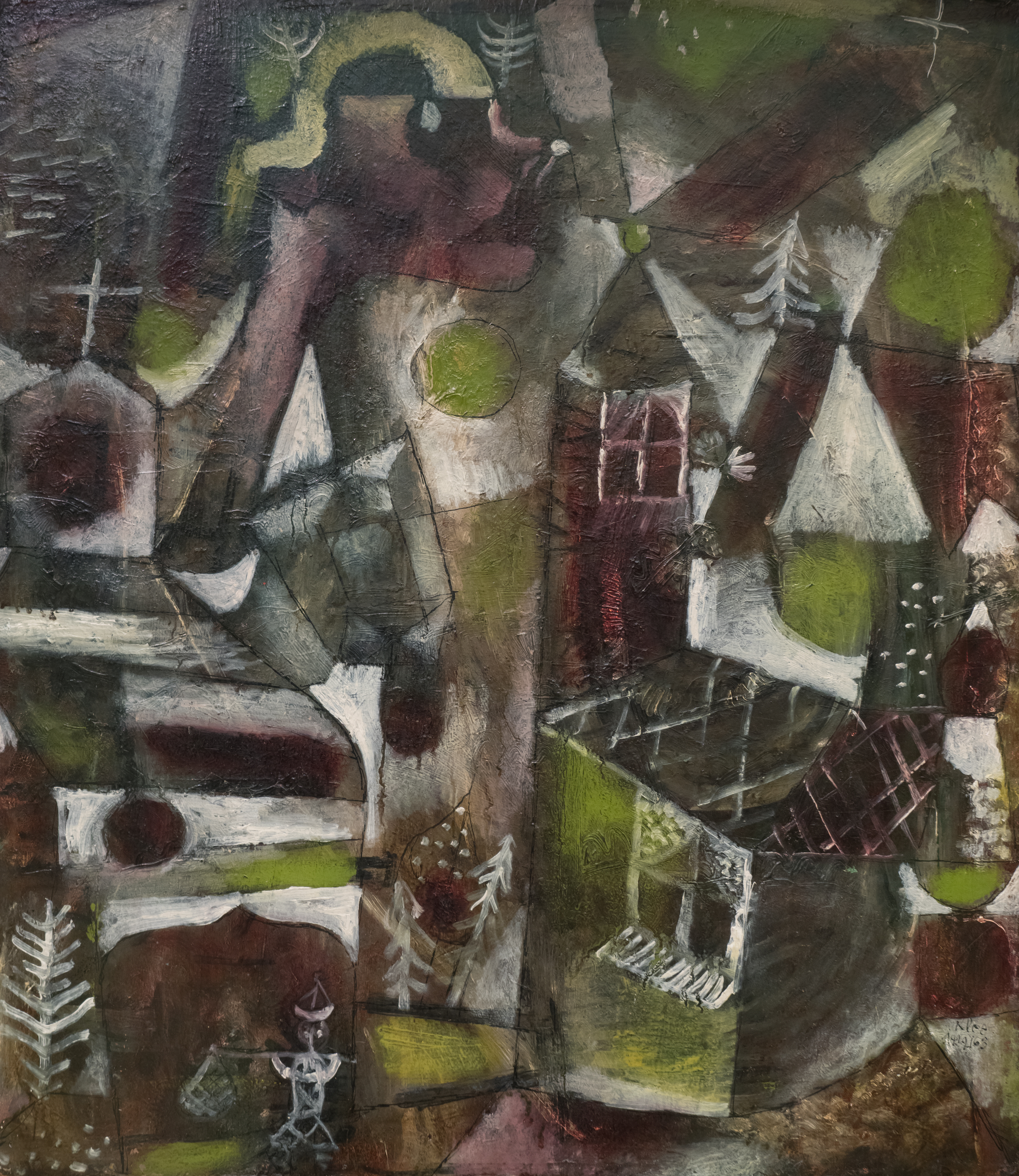
- Artist: Paul Klee
- Year: 1919
- Type: Oil on cardboard
- Dimensions: 47 cm × 41 cm (19 in × 16 in)
- Location: Städtische Galerie im Lenbachhaus; Munich

Swamp Legend ("Sumpflegende") is a 1919 oil-on-cardboard painting by Swiss-German painter Paul Klee. It has been in the Städtische Galerie im Lenbachhaus in Munich since 1982, but its ownership was disputed due to its provenance. The painting was one of the works that the Nazis declared "degenerate art", and they confiscated it from the Landesmuseum Hannover in 1937. However, it was not owned by the museum, but was there on a loan from the art historian Sophie Lissitzky-Küppers. In July 2017 it became known that her heirs had reached an agreement with the city of Munich abouts its ownership.

== Description ==
The painting belongs to a series of "cosmic landscapes" that Klee created in a large number from 1917 to 1919, expressing a symbolic conception of nature. In abstract color spaces, dominated by sulphurous yellow and contrasted with violet, the objects arrange themselves in a naïve way. In the dreamlike scenery, the human figure itself becomes a piece of nature. As Klee wrote in his Diaries: “Earlier (even as a child) the landscape was very clear to me. A scenery for moods of the soul. Dangerous times begin now, when nature wants to swallow me, I am nothing anymore, but I have peace.”

== Provenance ==
The painting was purchased shortly after its completion by Paul Küppers, the director of the Hannoverscher Künstlerverein, and his wife Sophie, later Lissitzky-Küppers, directly from the artist's studio in Munich. In 1926, Sophie Lissitzky-Küppers loaned the painting to the Hanover Provincial Museum, along with 15 other modernist works. On July 5, 1937, it was confiscated there by the National Socialist Art Commission as part of the campaign against “Degenerate Art”. From July 19, 1937, it was presented in the eponymous abusive exhibition on the so-called "Dada Wall".

In 1941, one of Hitler's official art dealers, Hildebrand Gurlitt bought the picture from the German Reich for 500 Swiss francs. In 1962 it was auctioned at the Lempertz auction house in Cologne, despite a reference to its origin and the assumption that it was still owned by Sophie Lissitzky-Küppers, and acquired by the Swiss collector Ernst Beyeler. He sold it to the Rosengart Gallery in Lucerne, where it was held from 1973 to 1982. It was then acquired for DM 700,000 by the Gabriele Münter and Johannes Eichner Foundation and the city of Munich, which loaned it to the Städtische Galerie im Lenbachhaus.

In 1992, Jen Lissitzky, the son of Sophie Lissitzky-Küppers, filed a lawsuit demanding restitution at the Munich District Court. The lawsuit was dismissed because of the statute of limitations. The principles of lifting the statute of limitations according to the Washington Declaration, to which the public museums in Germany have committed themselves, do not apply in this case, since the Lenbachhaus is a private foundation. At the end of March 2012, the heirs filed another lawsuit against the city of Munich for the picture to be handed over, on the grounds that there were new documents as evidence.

In July 2017 it became known that the heirs had reached an agreement with the city of Munich that they would be paid compensation and the painting would remain in the Lenbachhaus. The amount of the compensation was not mentioned.

== See also ==
- List of works by Paul Klee
