= Warren Forma =

Documentary filmmaker

Warren Forma (November 27, 1923 - March 26, 2014) was an American filmmaker and author, best known for his "Artists at Work" documentary film series and book on European and American painters and sculptors in the 1960s and 1970s, his 1973 novel The Falling Man, which contrasts the violence of 1920s Ireland and 1940s Harlem, New York, and They Were Ragtime, Forma's 1976 illustrated history of American cultural icons and political and economic movers and shakers in the "Ragtime" era of 1892 to 1917.

== Early years ==
Forma was born in Manhattan, New York and attended P.S. 6 Elementary School.

== Military service ==
During World War II, he enlisted in the United States Air Force. He took part in 65 combat missions over France and Germany as navigator and bombardier aboard Douglas A-20 Havoc light bombers in the 670th and 668th Squadrons of the 416th Bombardment Group. His skills as navigator and bombardier, much praised in the Operational History, 668th Bomb Squadron, earned him the Distinguished Flying Cross. Following his discharge, Forma enlisted in the United States Army and served as an infantryman in the closing months of the European theatre.

== Postwar, 1946–1979 ==
After the war Forma studied at New York University at night while driving an electric delivery truck for the Ward Baking Company. In 1946, with encouragement from photographer William Helburn, Forma embarked on a career as an agent/representative for photographers, including Helburn, Ben Somoroff and Arnold Newman, and later, cinematographers Laszlo Kovacs, Harold Becker, and Haskell Wexler.

== Filmmaking ==
While pursuing his career as photographers' and film makers' agent, Forma independently produced and directed his own films. This began in 1954; when asked to document Helburn's auto racing efforts, Forma purchased a 16mm film camera, rented a helicopter, and did so. His resulting film, Man and Car, received a positive reaction, setting the stage for his award-winning documentary series "Artists at Work".

== "Artists At Work" film documentary series 1963–1967 ==
Forma's film studies of 23 artists at work in their studios received widespread recognition and awards for their detailed and candid interviews and detailed portrayals of living artists at their labors. The films were commissioned and aired by National Educational Television, CBS and ABC in the United States, and distributed throughout Canada, Australia, Japan and West Germany. The Artists at Work" documentaries include:

- School of Paris: (5 Artists at Work), 1963. Study of contemporary artists Hans Hartung, Claude Weisbuch, Günter Fruhtrunk, Jean Dewasne and di Tiena.
- 5 British Sculptors (Work and Talk) Henry Moore, Reg Butler, Barbara Hepworth, Lynn Chadwick, Kenneth Armitage, 1964. A study of sculptors Reg Butler, Barbara Hepworth, Kenneth Armitage, Lynn Chadwick and Henry Moore. 28 minutes.
- Images of Leonard Baskin, 1966. Life and work of sculptor and print maker Leonard Baskin at Smith College in Northampton, Massachusetts.
- Weapons of Gordon Parks, 1967. Documentary of the life of Gordon Parks, the internationally renowned black photographer for Life Magazine.
- Possibilities of Agam, 1967. Documentary of the Israeli kinetic artist & philosopher Yacov Agam. In 1980, Forma produced a second film on Agam entitled Agam and....
- Seven Roman Artists, 1967. New developments in Italian Painting and sculpture including the work of futurist Gino Severini, Pietro Consagra, Franchina, Afro Basaldella, Antonio Corpora, Piero Dorazio, Alberto Burri and Roberto Matta.
- The Americans. Documents three East-coast painters - Jack Tworkov, Hans Hofmann and Milton Avery.

== Books ==
- Artists at Work. A companion volume to the eponymous film series, the book offers a close look into the minds of twenty three active artists from England, France, Italy, the United States and Israel over the period 1964 to 1967.
- The Falling Man, 1973. This novel compares and interweaves the violence of 1920s Ireland and 1940s Harlem, from the vantage point of an injured, dying policeman.
- They Were Ragtime, 1976. An illustrated history of American cultural icons and political and economic movers and shakers in the "Ragtime" era of 1892 to 1917.
- The Day God Smiled, 2010. Historic fiction chronicling events of the second half of the 20th century through three generations of an American family.
