= Sophie Lissitzky-Küppers =

German art historian (1891–1978)

Sophie Lissitzky-Küppers (1891–1978), born Sophie Schneider, was a German art historian, patron of the avant-garde, author, and art collector.

== Biography ==
Küppers, née Schneider, was born in Kiel, Germany in 1891, the daughter of Christian and Mathilde Schneiders. She studied art history at university where she met her first husband, Paul Erich Küppers, who was the artistic director of the Kestner Society in Germany.They had two children. After he died in the flu epidemic in 1922, Küppers, now a widow, met the Russian artist El Lissitzky and married him.

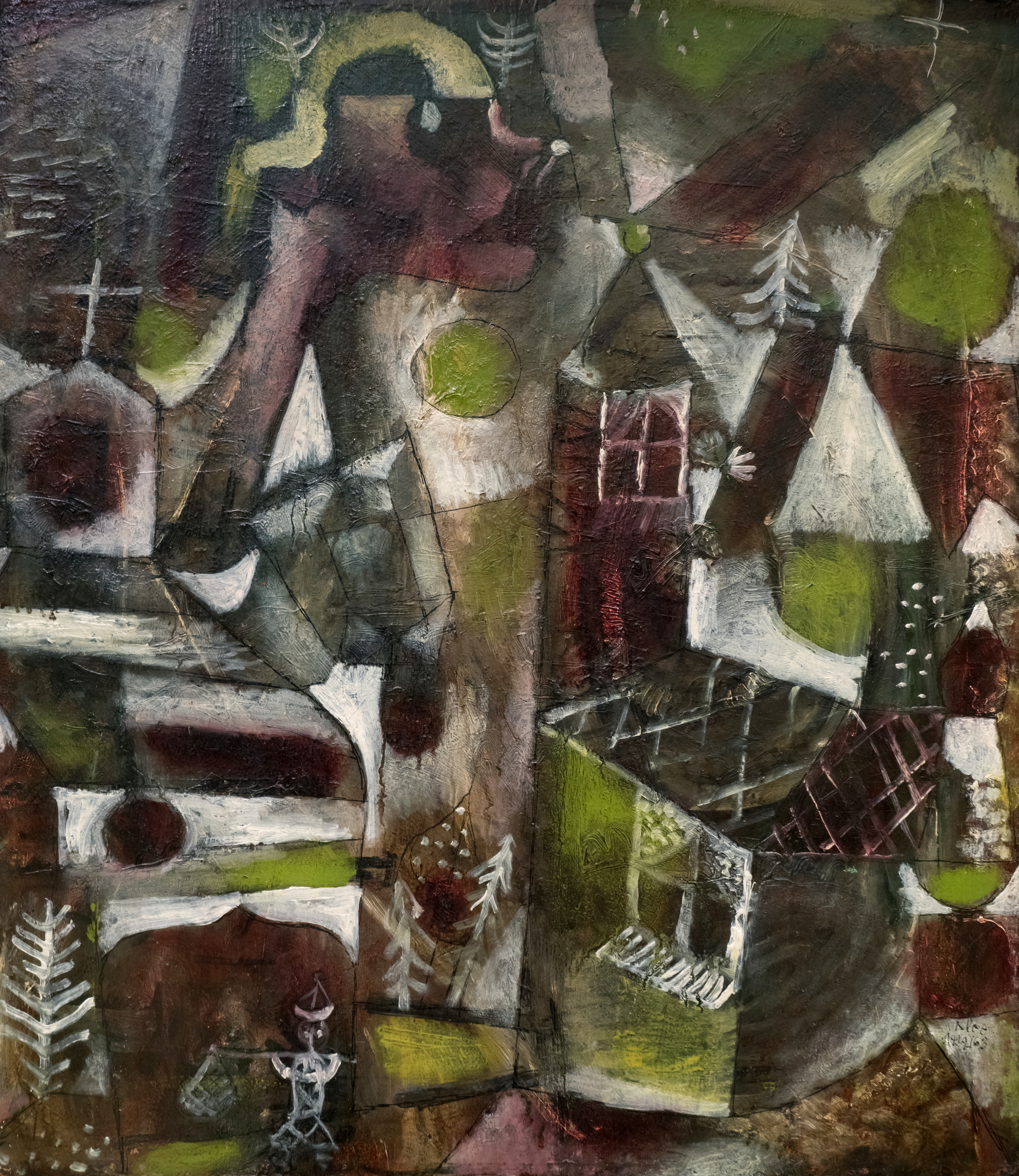
Paul Klee, Swamp Legend, in the collection of the Munich's Lenbachhaus Museum, compensation finally paid to the family of Lissitzky-Küppers in 2015 after protracted legal action

In 1927 Küppers moved to the Soviet Union and collaborated on a number of large-scale exhibition projects with her second husband, artist and designer El Lissitzky. She later wrote El Lissitzky: Life, Letters, Texts (1967).

== Nazi seizure of art ==
Before moving to the Soviet Union she loaned some thirteen works, including Lyonel Feiniger's Die Brücke, Piet Mondrian's Schilderij No. 2, "mit Blau, Gelb, Schwarz und verschiedenen hellgrauen und weißen Tönen", Emil Filla's Stilllife, Albert Gleizes's Landschaft bei Paris, Wassily Kandinsky's Zwei schwarze Flecken, and Improvisation Nr. 10 and a Paul Klee painting, Swamp Legend, to the Provinzial Museum in Hanover. In 1937 the Nazis seized the loaned works from the museum as part of their "degenerate art" campaign. The Nazis sold the works abroad for foreign currency, and the Küppers-Lissitzky collection was dispersed throughout the world.

In 1944, three years after Lissitzky died, Küppers was deported as an enemy foreigner to Novosibirsk, where she lived for the next thirty-four years.

== Claims for restitution for Nazi-looted art ==
After several changes of ownership, the Klee painting (Swamp Legend) ended up in Munich's Lenbachhaus Museum, where in 2015 it was under protracted legal action from the heirs of Lissitzky-Küppers for its restitution. An agreement was finally reached in 2017 for the Museum to retain the painting but for compensation (estimated at between €2–4 million, or $2.33–4.65 million) to be paid to the heirs of the original owner.

In 2001 the Kiyomizu Sannenzaka Museum in Kyoto, Japan restituted a watercolor entitled "Deserted Square of an Exotic Town", 1921, by Paul Klee that had been stolen by the Nazis from Sophie Küppers-Lissitzky.

In December 2021, the heirs of Piet Mondrian filed a lawsuit against the Philadelphia Museum of art for Composition with Blue, which the artist had consigned to Küppers-Lissitzky when it was seized by the Nazis.
