= Lenbachhaus =

Art museum in Munich, Germany

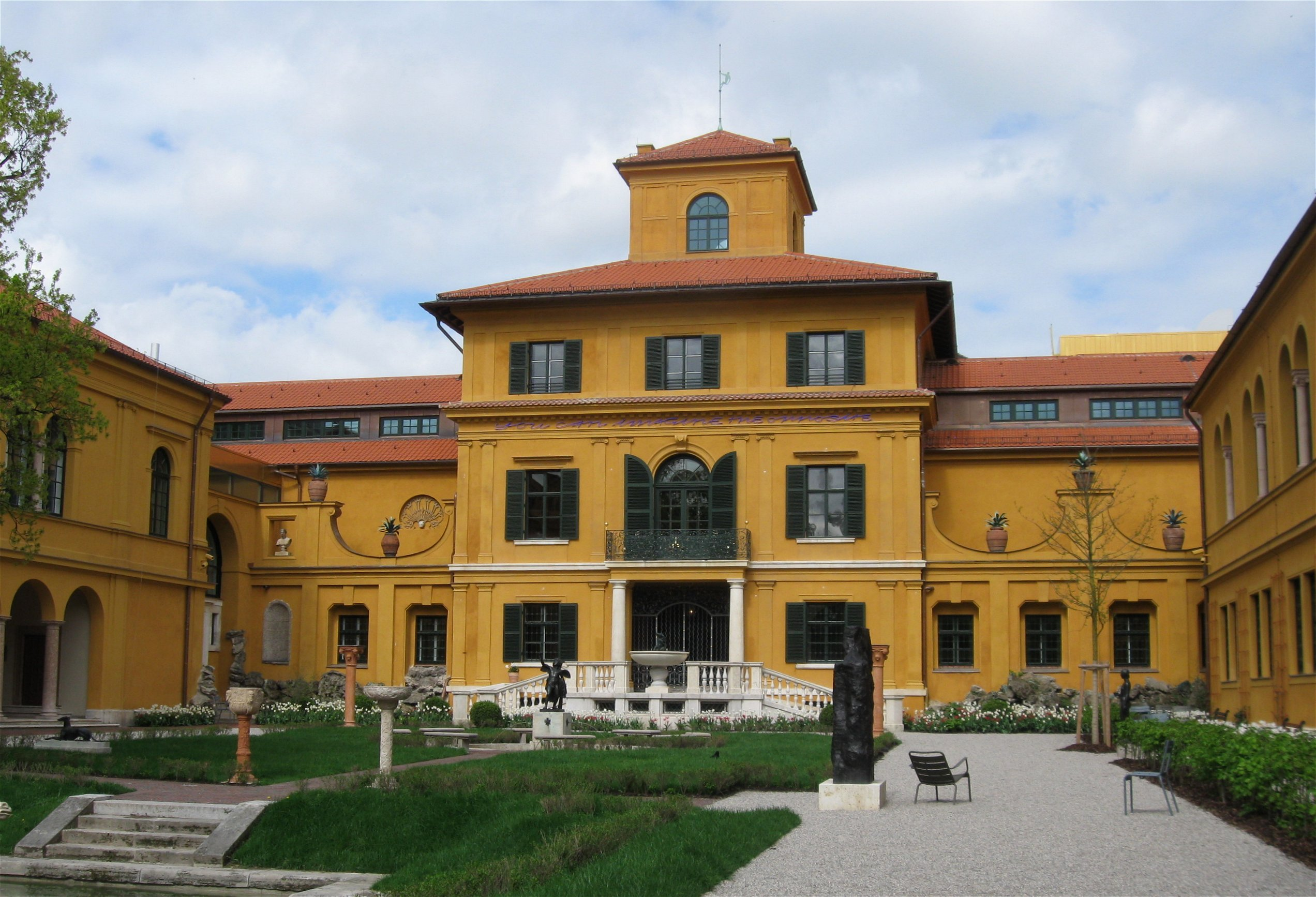
- Before the reopening in 2013
- Interactive fullscreen map
- Location: Munich, Germany
- Coordinates: 48°08′49″N 11°33′49″E

The Lenbachhaus (German: [ˈlɛnbaxˌhaʊs]) is a building housing the Städtische Galerie (English: Municipal Gallery) art museum in Munich's Kunstareal.

== The building ==
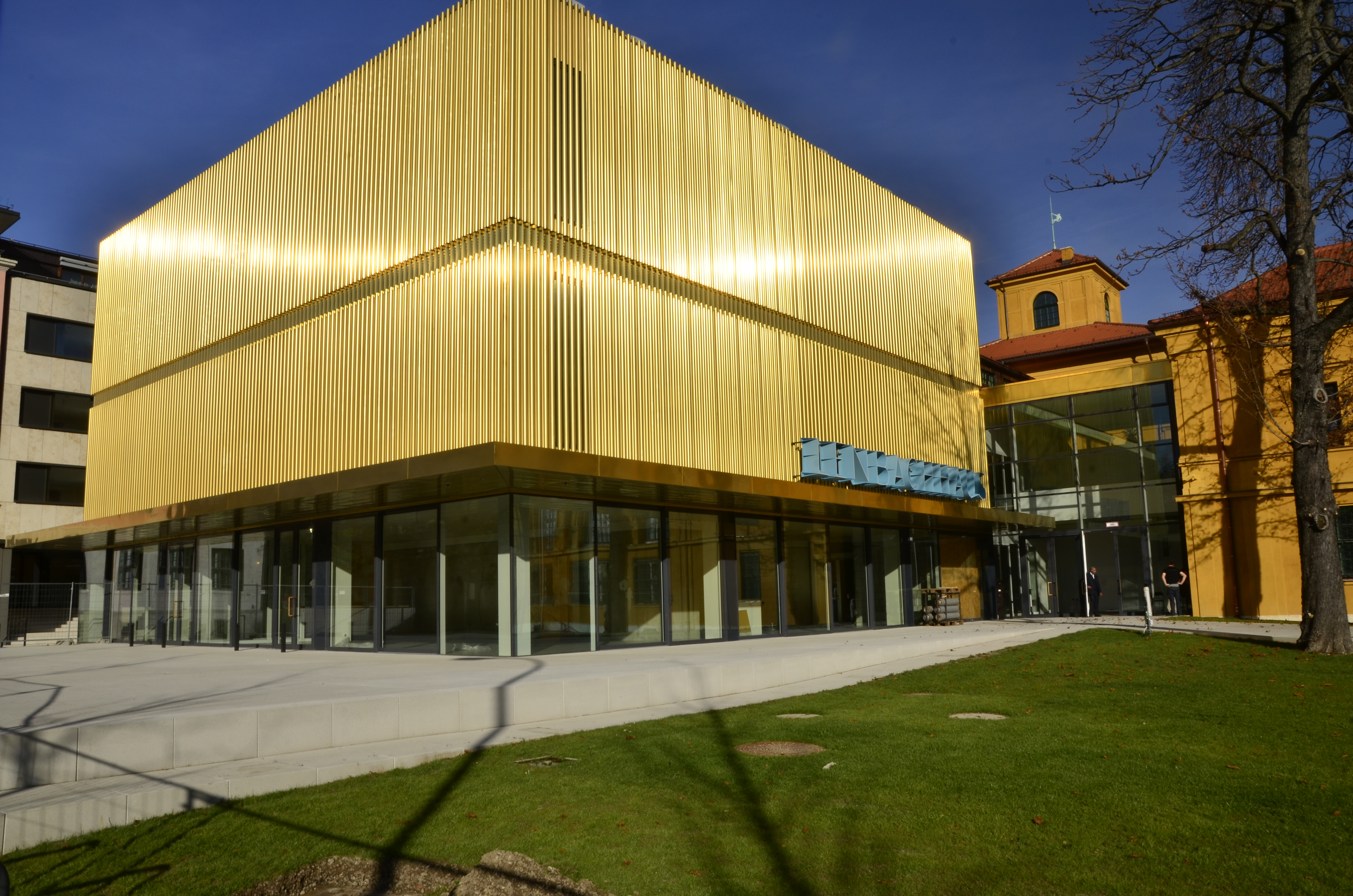
New modern wing of the Lenbachhaus

The Lenbachhaus was built as a Florentine-style villa for the painter Franz von Lenbach, between 1887 and 1891 by Gabriel von Seidl, and was expanded in 1927–1929 by Hans Grässel, and again in 1969–1972 by Heinrich Volbehr and Rudolf Thönnessen. Some of the rooms have kept their original design.

The city of Munich acquired the building in 1924 and opened a museum there in 1929. The latest wing was closed to the public in 2009 to allow the expansion and restoration of the Lenbachhaus by Norman Foster; the 1972 extension was demolished to make way for the new building. The museum reopened in May 2013. The architect placed the new main entrance on Museumsplatz in front of the Propylaea. The new facade, clad in metal tubes made of an alloy of copper and aluminum, will weather with time.

== The gallery ==
The Städtische Galerie im Lenbachhaus contains a variety of works by Munich painters and contemporary artists, in styles such as the Blue Rider and New Objectivity.

=== Munich painters ===
Starting with late Gothic paintings, the gallery displays masterpieces by Munich artists such as Jan Polack, Christoph Schwarz, Georges Desmarees (Countess Holstein 1754), Wilhelm von Kobell, Georg von Dillis, Carl Rottmann (Cosmic stormlandscape 1849), Carl Spitzweg (Childhood Friends, c. 1860), Eduard Schleich, Carl Theodor von Piloty, Franz von Stuck (Salome 1906), Franz von Lenbach (Self Portrait with His Wife and Daughters 1903), Friedrich August von Kaulbach, Wilhelm Leibl (Veterinarian Reindl in the Arbor c. 1890), Wilhelm Trübner and Hans Thoma.

Works by members of the Munich Secession are also on display. The group was founded in 1892, and included artists such as the impressionist painters Lovis Corinth (Self-portrait with skeleton 1896), Max Slevogt (Danae 1895) and Fritz von Uhde.

=== German Schools of Painting and Barbizon ===
In 2012, the Christoph Heilmann Foundation, the city of Munich, and the Lenbachhaus agreed to cooperate closely; in the process, around one hundred works were handed over to the Lenbachhaus. In addition to the Munich school of painting, the Dresden Romanticism and the Berlin school and the Düsseldorf school of painting are also shown in characteristic individual examples; the first portrayal of Barbizon's painters in France is particularly important. The Lenbachhaus now has got a major work by Gustave Courbet, who first appeared in 1851 in an exhibition in Munich next to paintings of Théodore Rousseau.

=== The Blue Rider ===
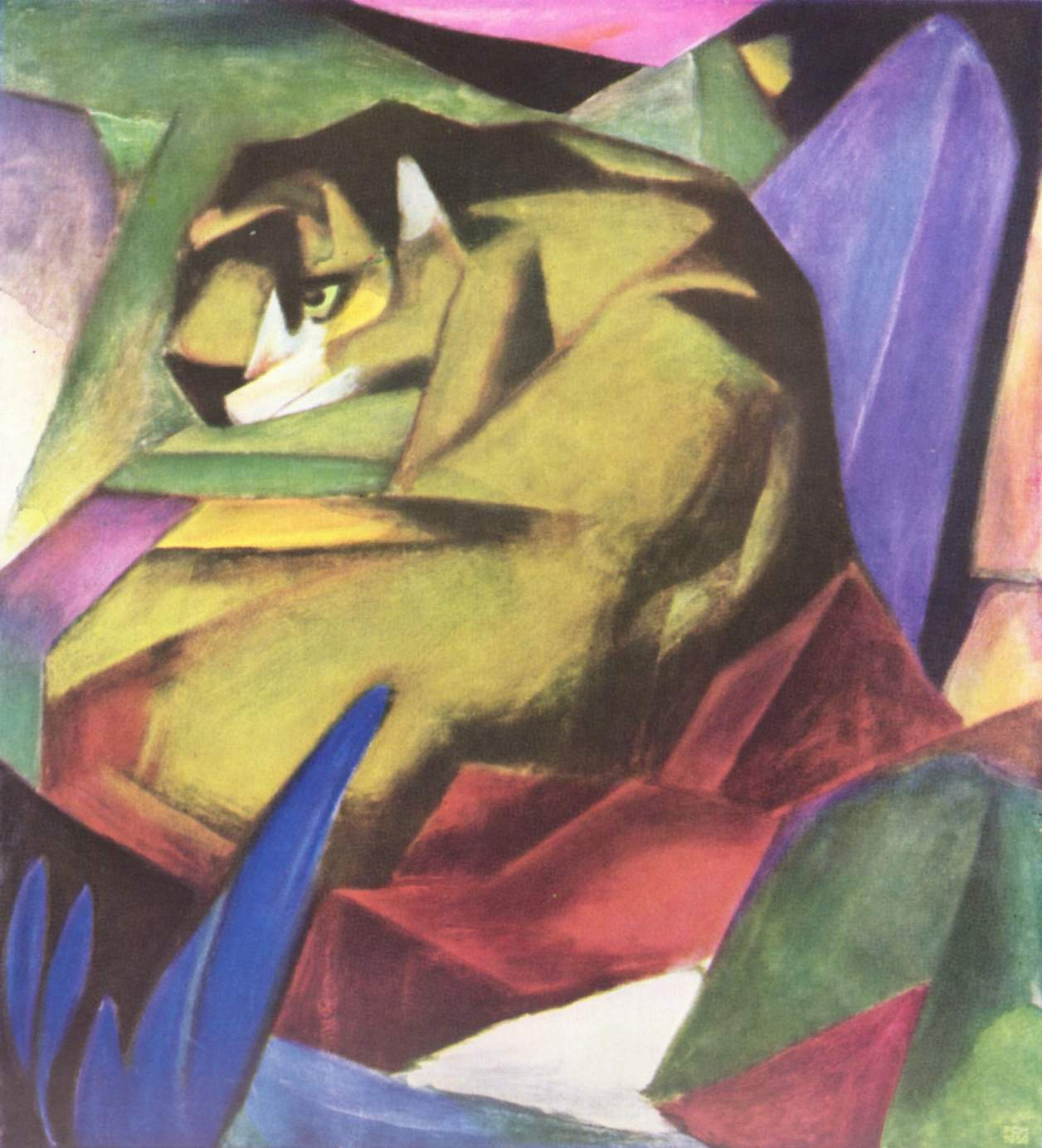
Franz Marc, The Tiger 1912

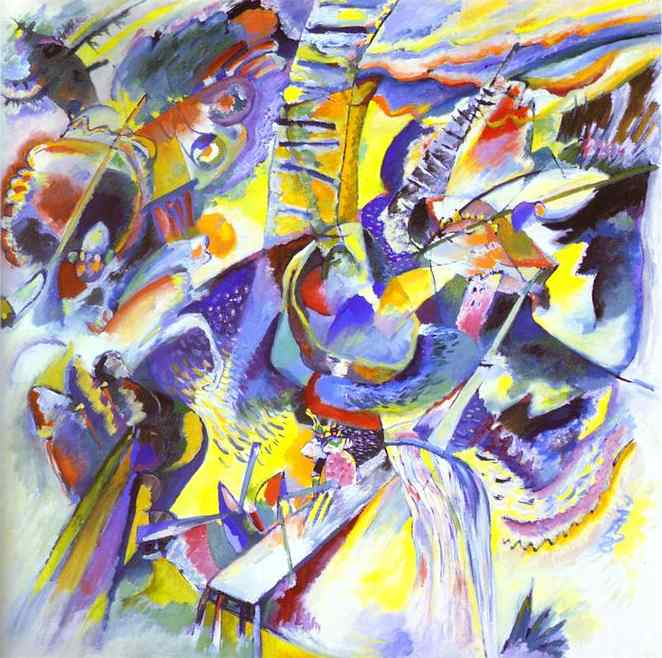
Wassily Kandinsky, Gorge Improvisation 1914

The Lenbachhaus is most famous for the worldwide largest collection of paintings by Der Blaue Reiter (The Blue Rider), a group of expressionist artists established in Munich in 1911 which included, among others, the painters Wassily Kandinsky (Impression III (Concert) 1911), Gabriele Münter (Still Life with St. George 1911), Franz Marc (Blue Horse I 1911), August Macke (Promenade 1913), Marianne von Werefkin (Self Portrait I c. 1910), Alexej von Jawlensky (Portrait of the Dancer Alexander Sacharoff 1909), Alfred Kubin (The Male Sphinx c. 1903), and Paul Klee (Föhn Wind in Franz Marc's Garden 1915). Münter donated 1,000 "Blue Rider" works to the museum on her 80th birthday.

=== New Objectivity ===
Artists of the New Objectivity like Christian Schad (Operation 1929) and Rudolf Schlichter (Bertolt Brecht c. 1926) are exhibited in several rooms.

=== Contemporary art ===
The museum displays a broad view of international contemporary art with works by Franz Ackermann, Dennis Adams, Christian Boltanski, Monica Bonvicini, James Coleman, Thomas Demand, Olafur Eliasson, Valie Export, Dan Flavin, Günther Förg, Günter Fruhtrunk, Rupprecht Geiger, Isa Genzken, Liam Gillick, Katharina Grosse, Michael Heizer, Andy Hope 1930 (Andreas Hofer), Jenny Holzer, Stefan Huber, Asger Jorn, Ellsworth Kelly, Anselm Kiefer, Michaela Melian, Gerhard Merz, Maurizio Nannucci, Roman Opałka, Sigmar Polke, Arnulf Rainer, Gerhard Richter, Michael Sailstorfer, Richard Serra, Katharina Sieverding, Andy Warhol, Georgia O'Keeffe, Lawrence Weiner and Martin Wöhrl, as well as artists of the Viennese Actionism. Art installations were added with the opening of the new building, such as a sculpture from Olafur Eliasson. The Lenbachhaus has considerably strengthened its investment by acquiring numerous works of art, especially in the oeuvre of Joseph Beuys, such as Zeige deine Wunde (Show your wound) 1974/75.

Young artists are promoted in exhibitions in the affiliated Kunstbau, above the Königsplatz Subway Station.

Stephanie Weber curated a solo show of Mark Boulos and a film series of Charles Simonds and Christoph Schlingensief, while commissioning performances by Tom Thayer and C. Spencer Yeh and adding to the collection works by Valie Export, and has worked on a retrospective of Polish-born feminist artist Lea Lublin that opened in summer 2015.

On 26 July 2017 a legal battle over a Paul Klee painting titled Swamp Legend (1919), seized by Nazis as "degenerate" art in the 1930s, reached a settlement:

"The city of Munich, where the work is on view at The Lenbachhaus museum, will keep the painting, but the heirs of the original owner will be reimbursed for the value of the masterpiece, estimated between 2–4 million ($2.33–4.65 million)."

== Gallery ==
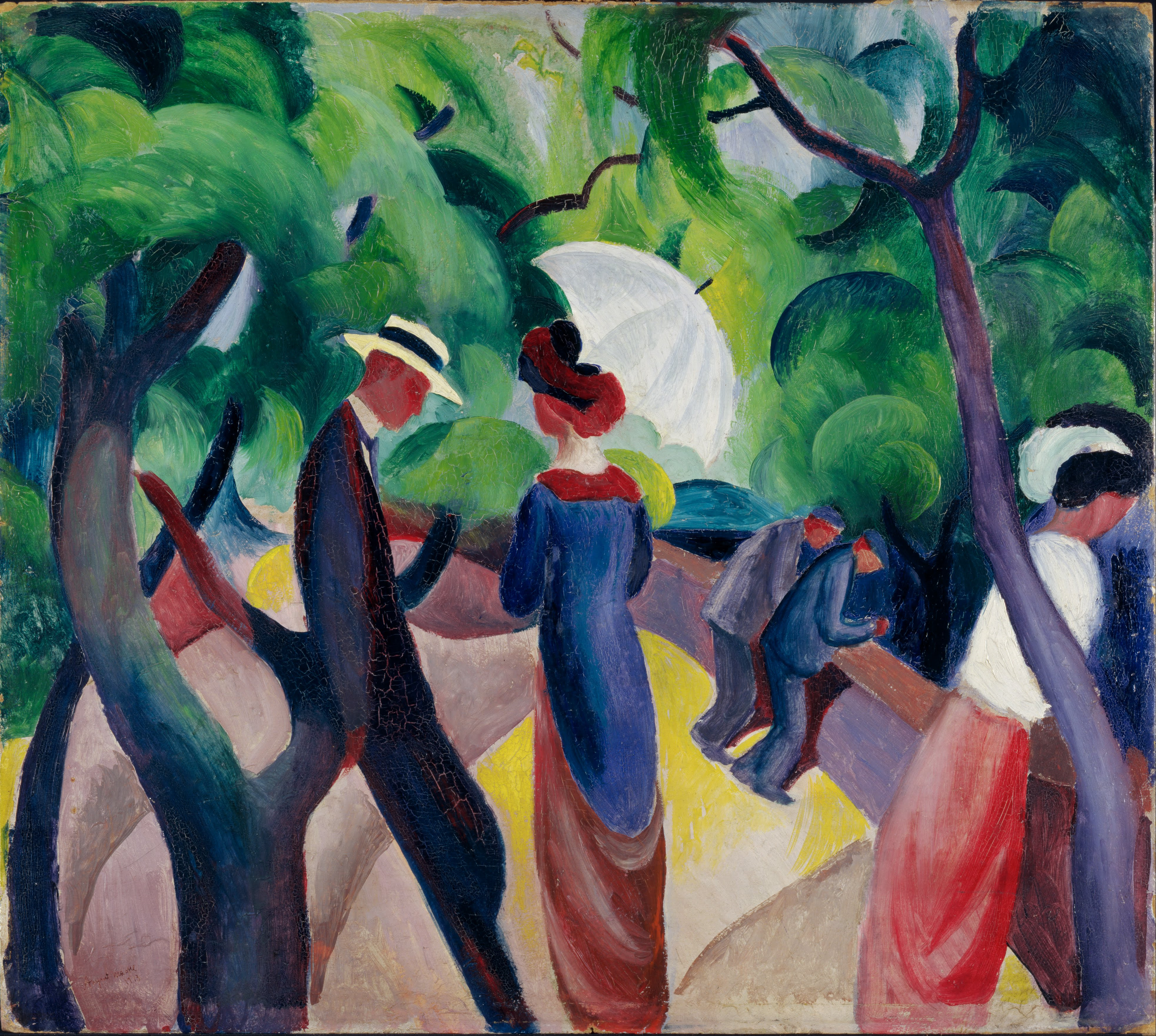
August Macke, Promenade

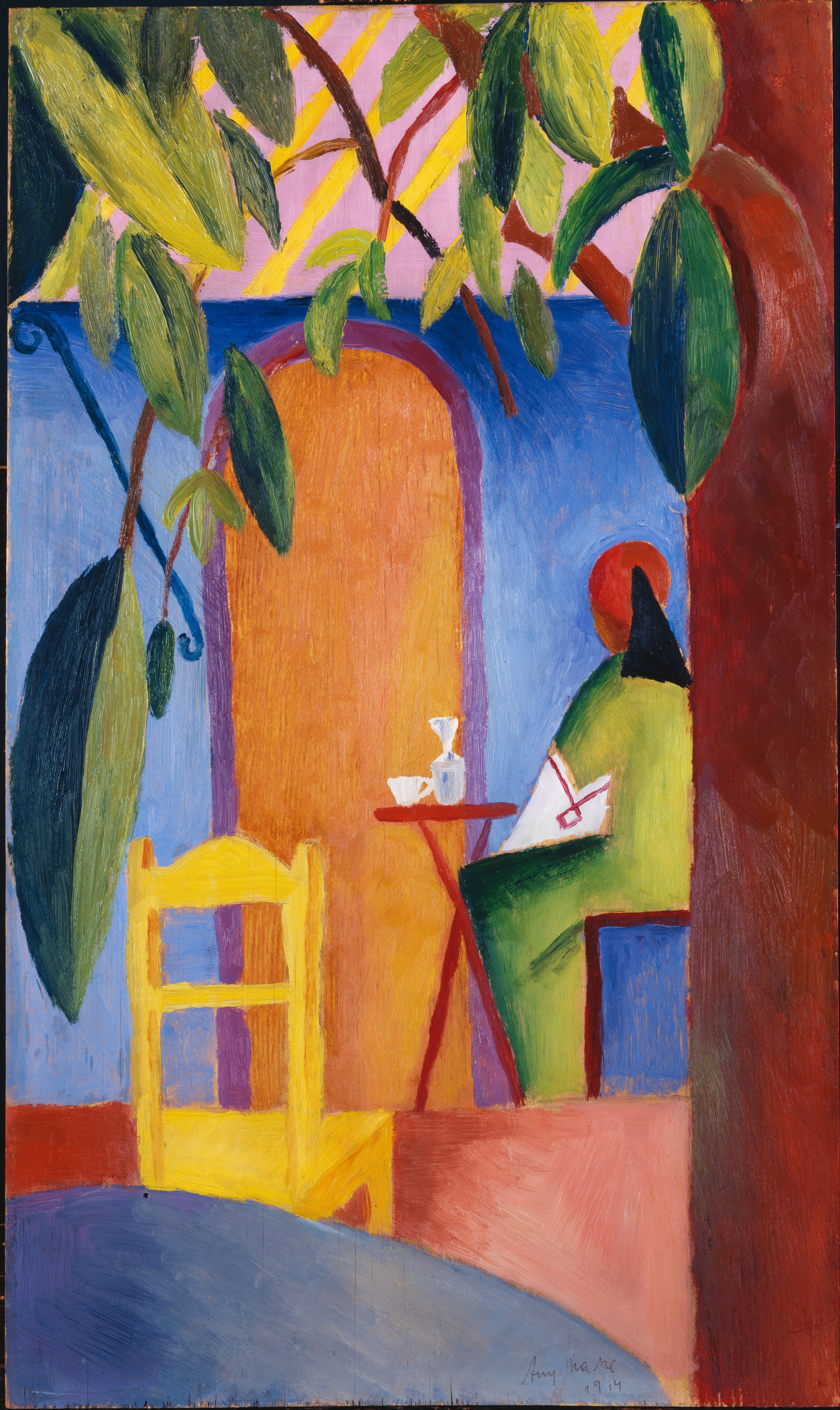
August Macke, Türkisches Café

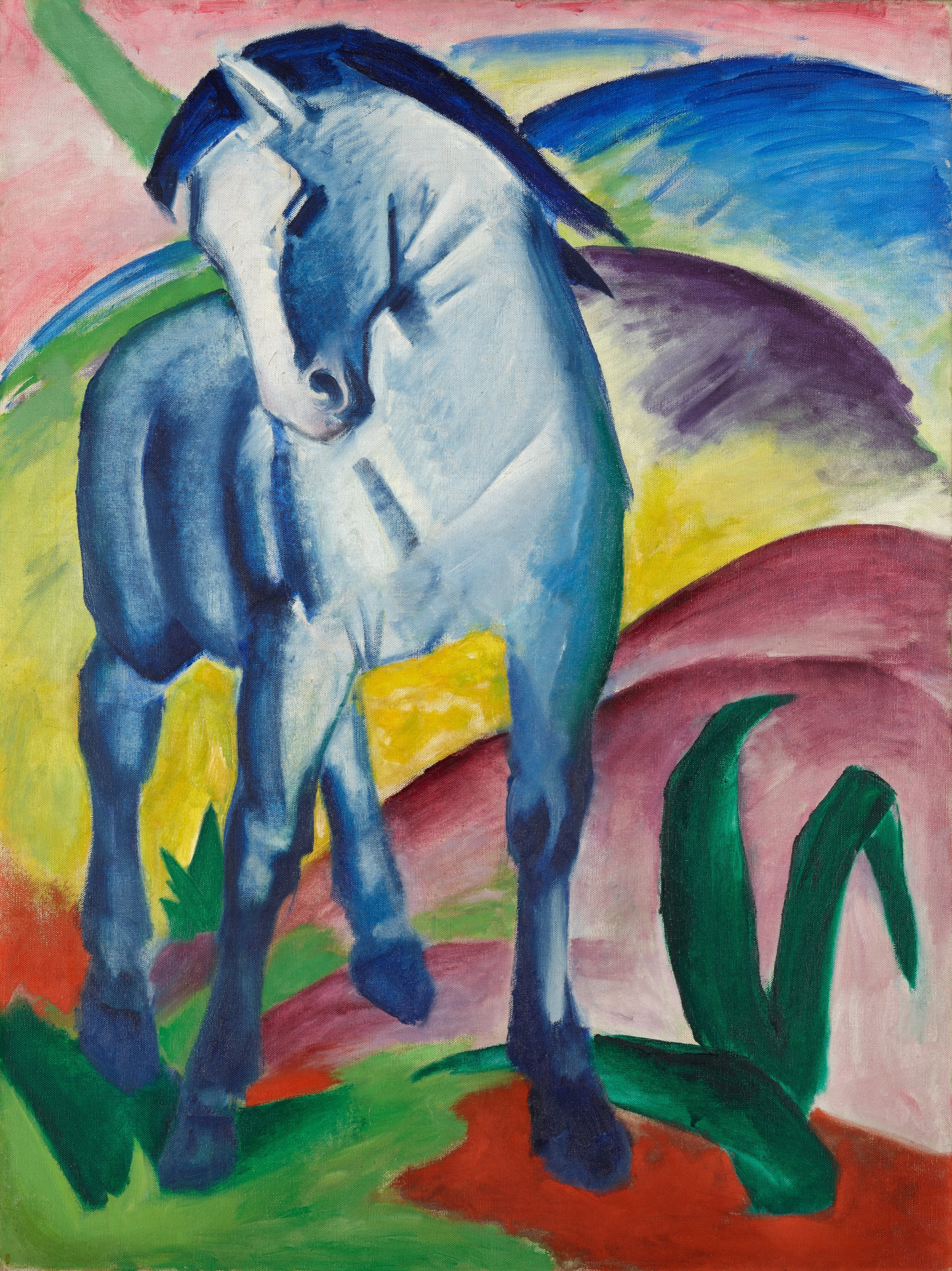
Franz Marc, Blue Horse

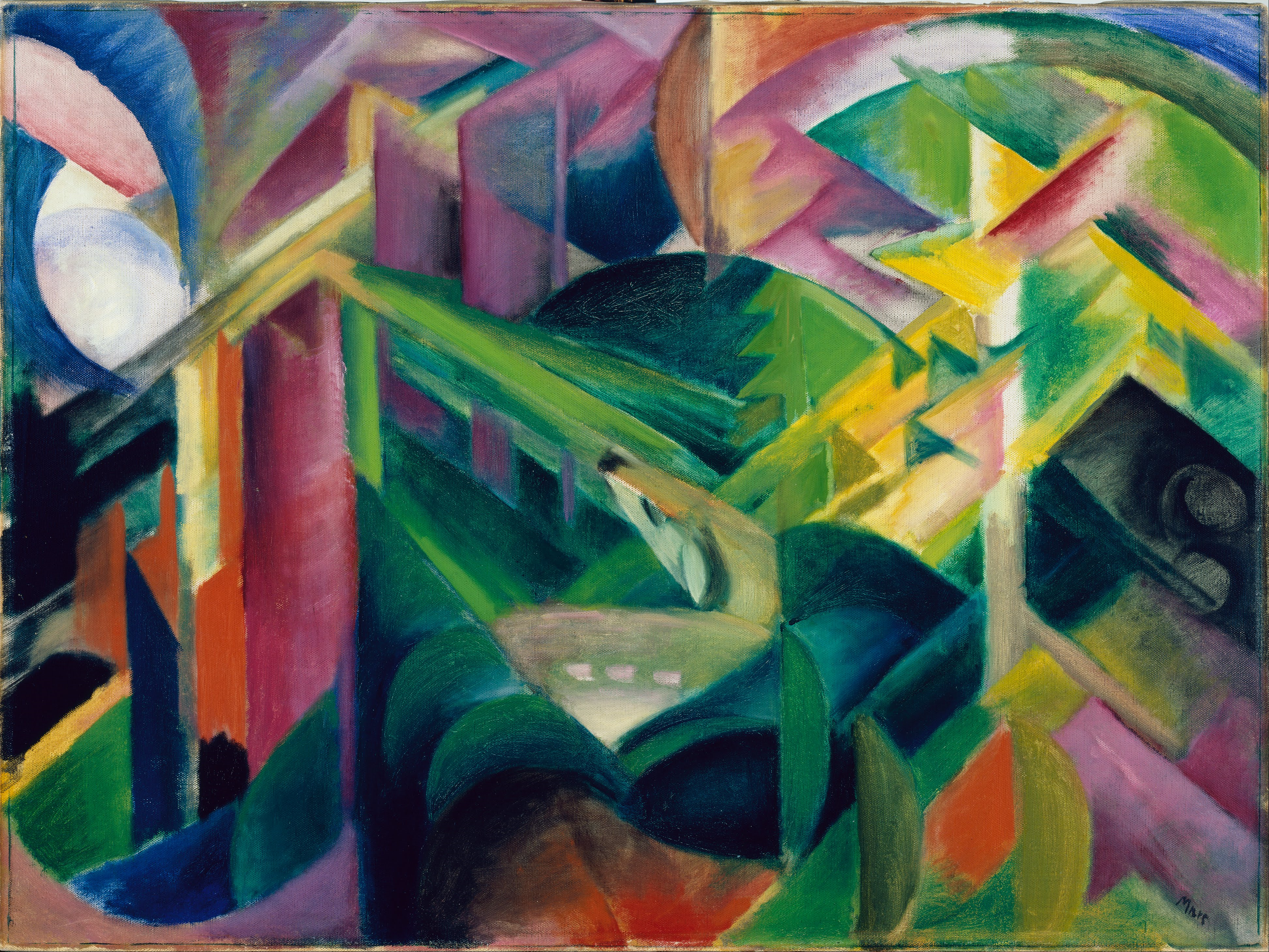
Franz Marc, Deer in a Monastery Garden

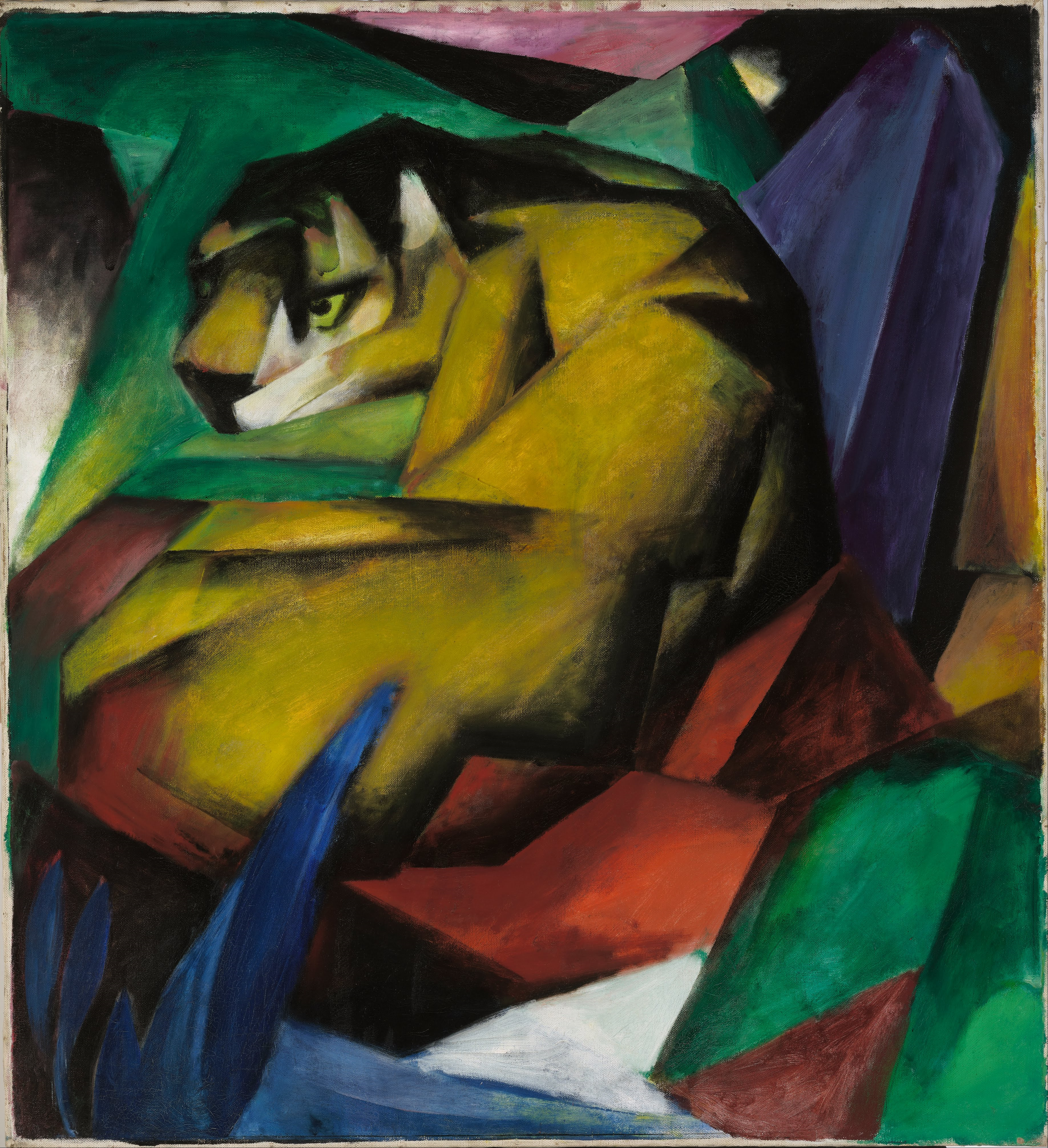
Franz Marc, The Tiger

== Provenance Research ==
The Lenbachhaus systematically checks the provenance of artworks created before 1945 that entered the collection after 1933. In addition to the examination of the museum's own collection holdings, preliminary reviews of possible new acquisitions, and acceptance of permanent loans or endowments also take place. The Lenbachhaus is one of several German museums that are researching the art collector Carl Heumann (1886–1945), who after building in the 1920s and 1930s an important collection of prints of German and Austrian art of the 18th and 19th centuries, was persecuted because of his Jewish origins under the National Socialist regime. The Lenbachhaus approached Carl Heumann's descendants in order to find a just and fair solution regarding the artworks from his collection.

In 2017 the heirs of Robert Gotschalk Lewenstein and his sister Wilhelmine Helena Lewenstein sued for the restitution of a "Colorful Life," by Wassily Kandinsky. The same year, a long running lawsuit concerning Paul Klee's Swamp Legend was settled with the heirs of Sophie Lissitzky-Küppers.
