= Kenneth Armitage =

English sculptor

Kenneth Armitage CBE
- Born: William Kenneth Armitage; 18 July 1916; Leeds, England
- Died: 22 January 2002 (aged 85); London, England
- Education: Leeds College of Art; Slade School of Fine Art
- Style: Bronze sculpture

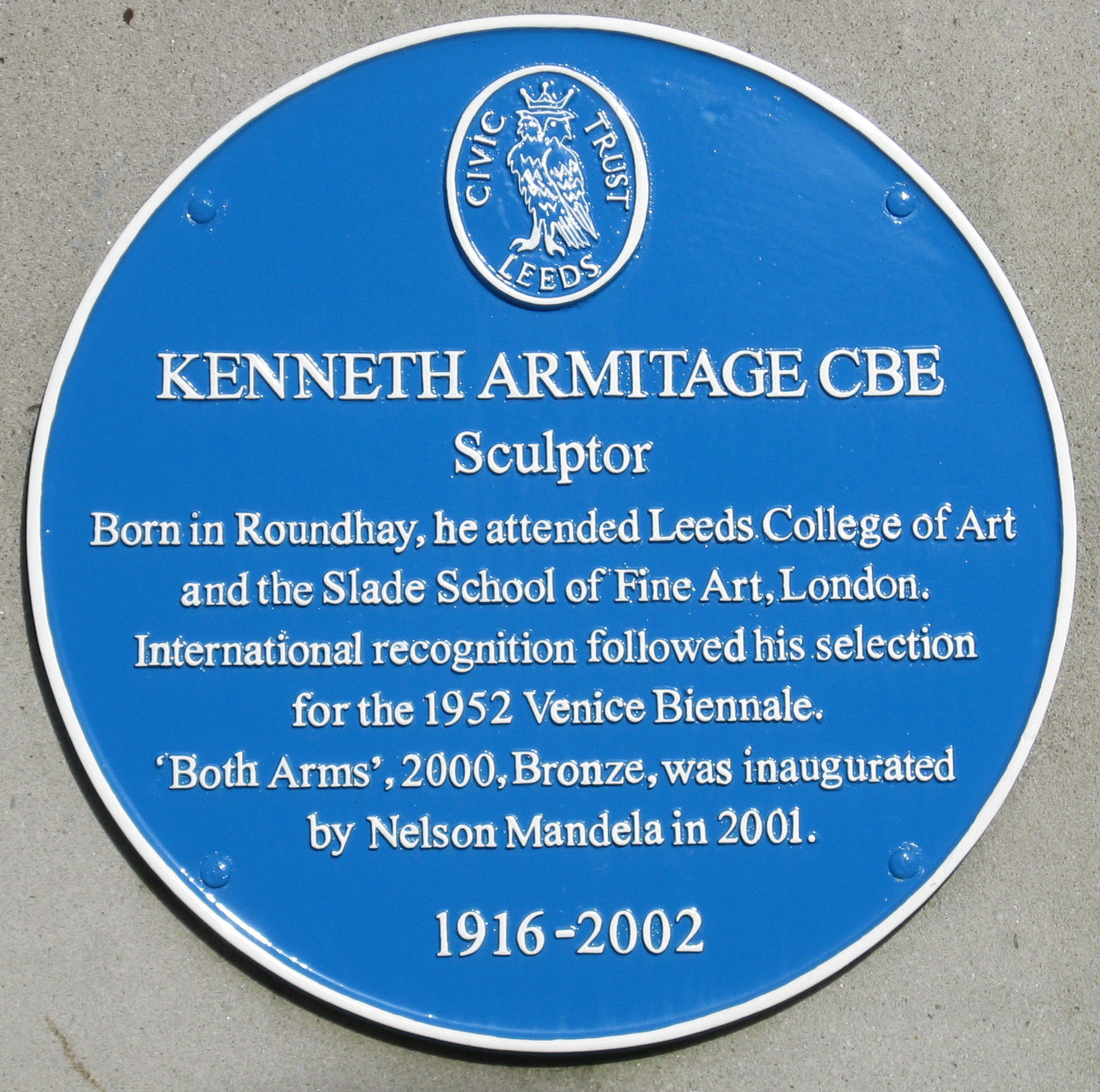
Blue Plaque in Leeds City Centre

William Kenneth Armitage (18 July 1916 – 22 January 2002) was a British sculptor known for his semi-abstract bronzes.

== Life ==
Armitage was born in Leeds on July 18, 1916, the youngest of three children studied at the Leeds College of Art and the Slade School of Fine Art in London before joining the British Army (Royal Artillery) in 1939.

In 1940 he married Joan Moore, another sculptor. They separated in the 1950s but never divorced. They had no children.

After leaving the army, Armitage became head of the sculpture department at the Bath Academy of Art in 1946. In 1952, he held his first one-man show in London. In 1953, he became Great Britain's first university artist in residence, at the University of Leeds (to 1956). In 1958, he won best international sculpture under age 45 at the Venice Biennale. Armitage was made CBE in 1969 and was elected to the Royal Academy in 1994. In 2001, his sculpture "Both Arms" was erected along with a blue plaque in Millennium Square, Leeds, being unveiled by Nelson Mandela. His 2001 sculpture "Legs walking" was erected in City Square, Leeds outside Mill Hill Chapel in 2018.

He died 22 January 2002.

== Work ==
Armitage's striking mature style was evident as early as 1952. Most of his works are recognizably human, but are sometimes joined with the forms of animals or furniture. Many displayed quirky humor. Armitage was also interested in ancient Egyptian and Cycladic art and his works have an archaic flavour. He was featured in the 1964 documentary film "5 British Sculptors (Work and Talk)" by American filmmaker Warren Forma. During the 1960s and beyond, Armitage adapted to the styles of the times, sometimes incorporating plastic or spray paint.

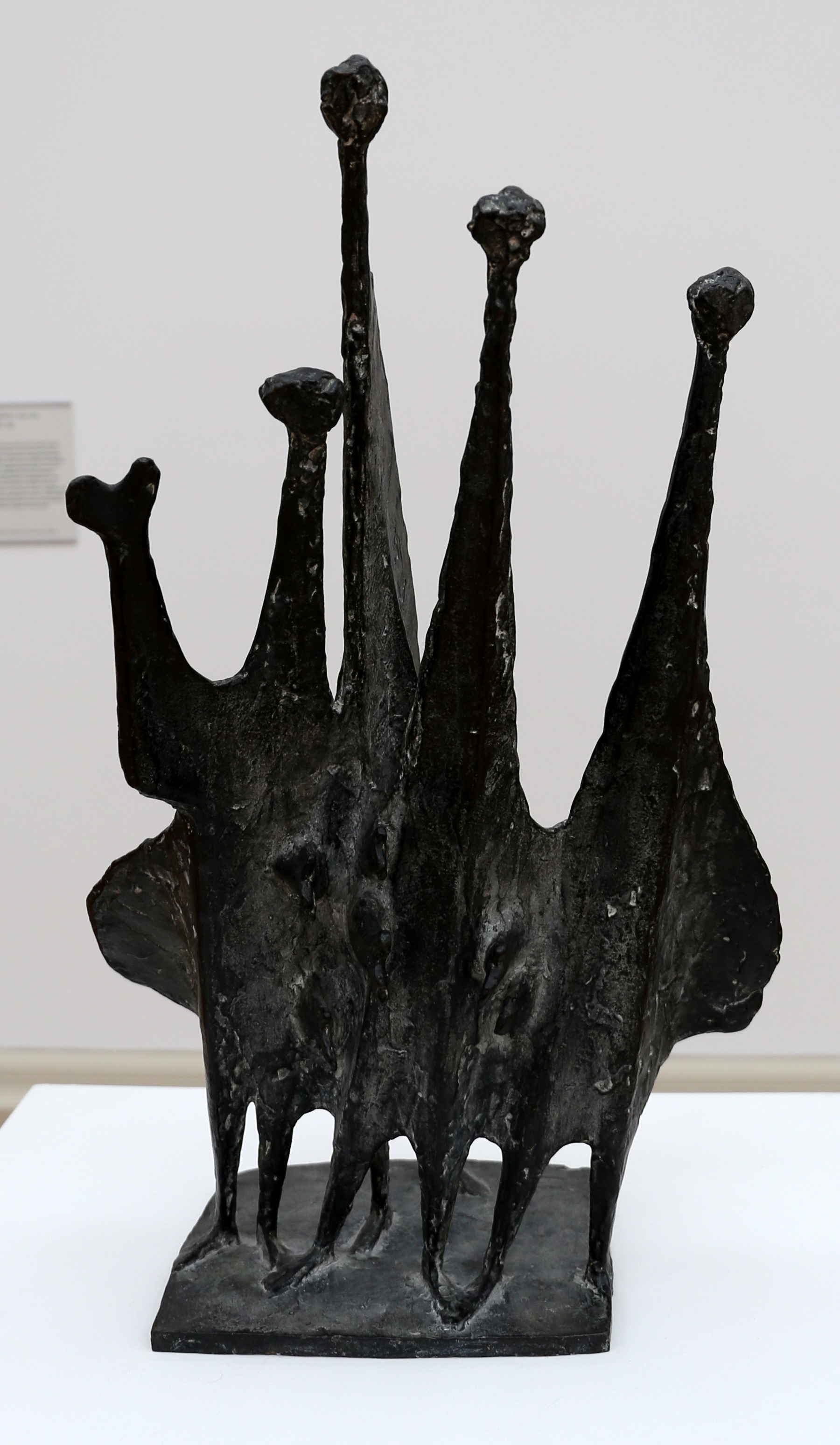
People in the Wind (1950) Exhibited at Venice Biennale in 1952

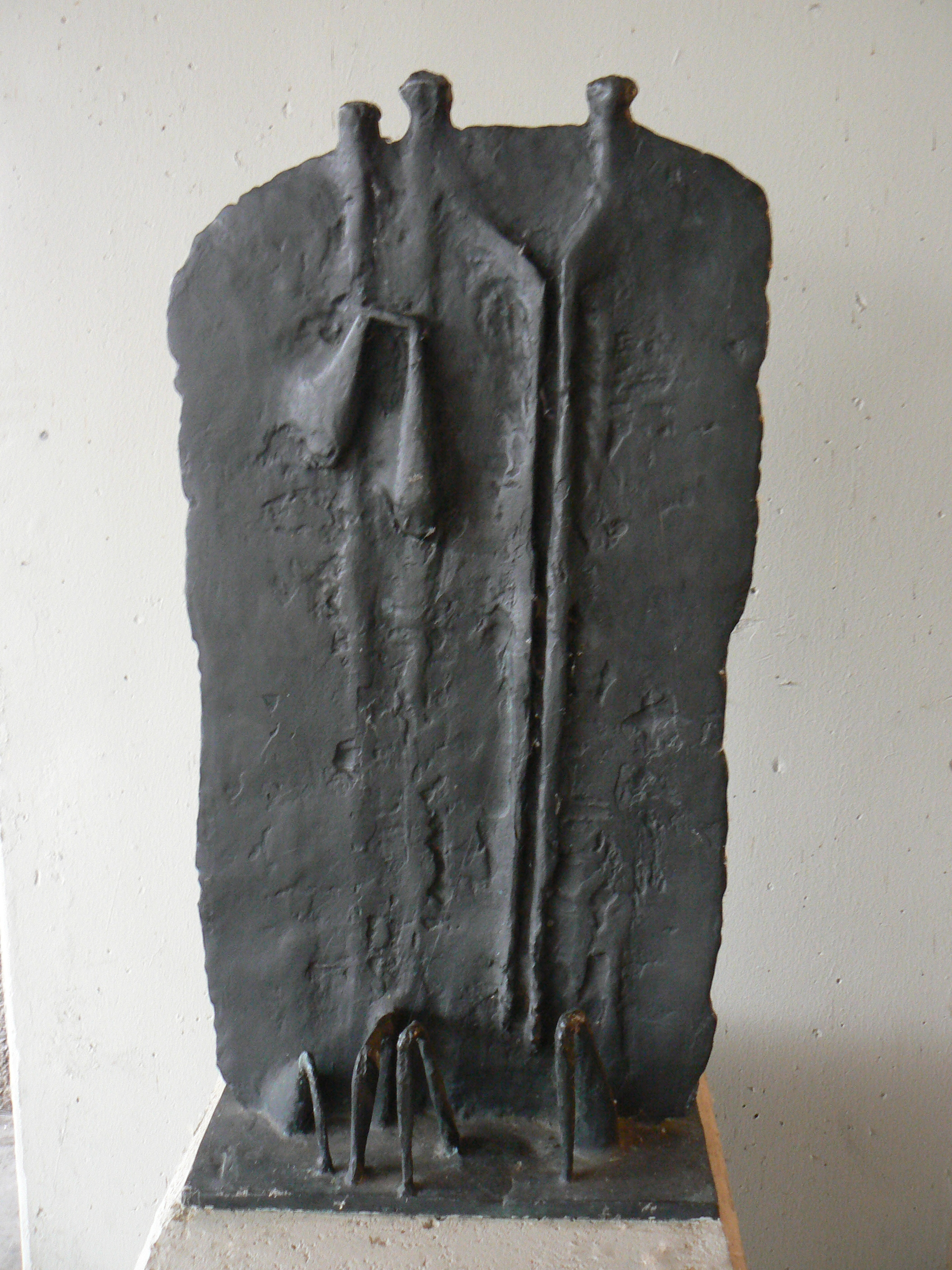
Sitting People (1952), Marl, Germany

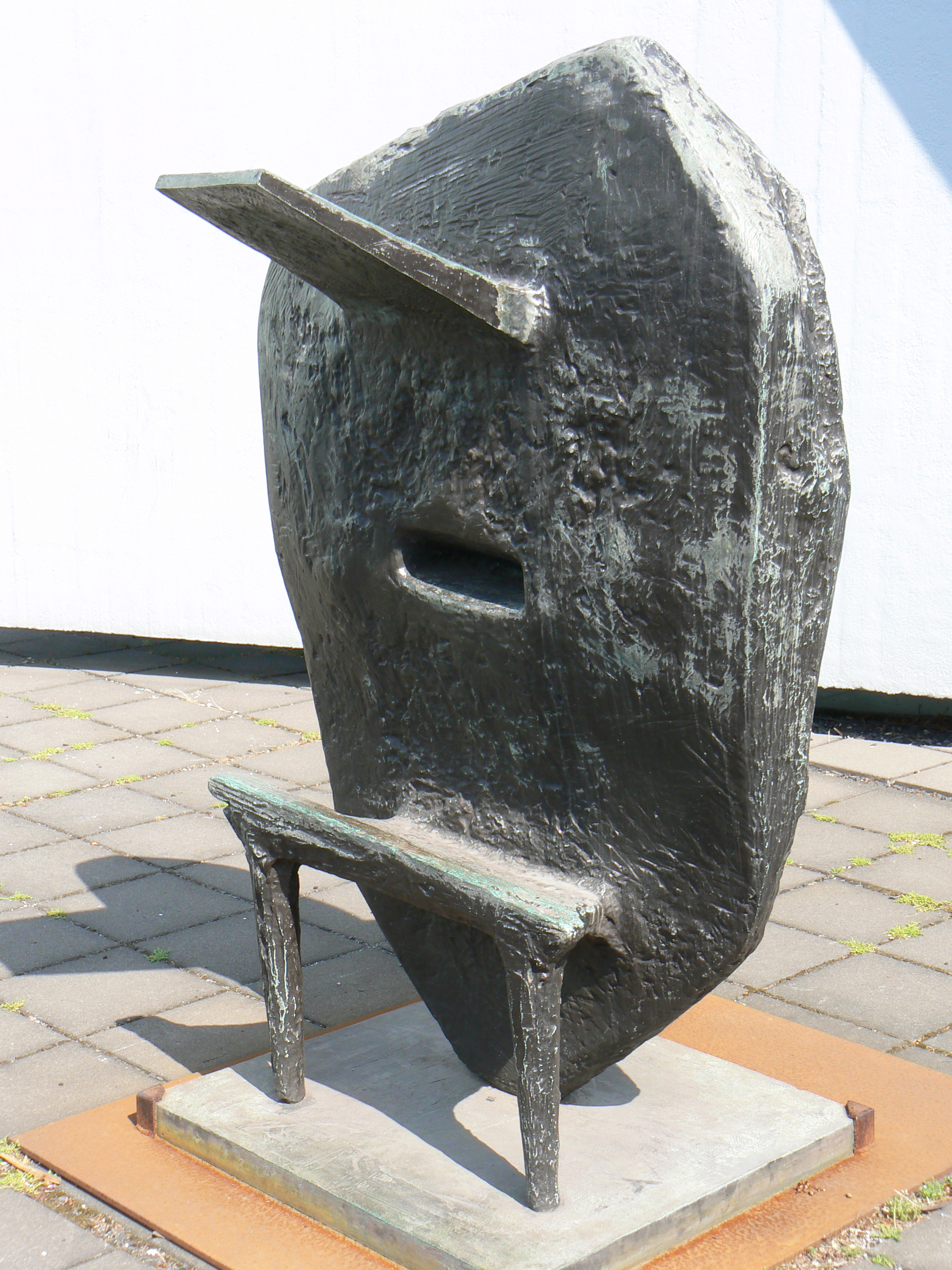
The Prophet (1961), Duisburg, Germany

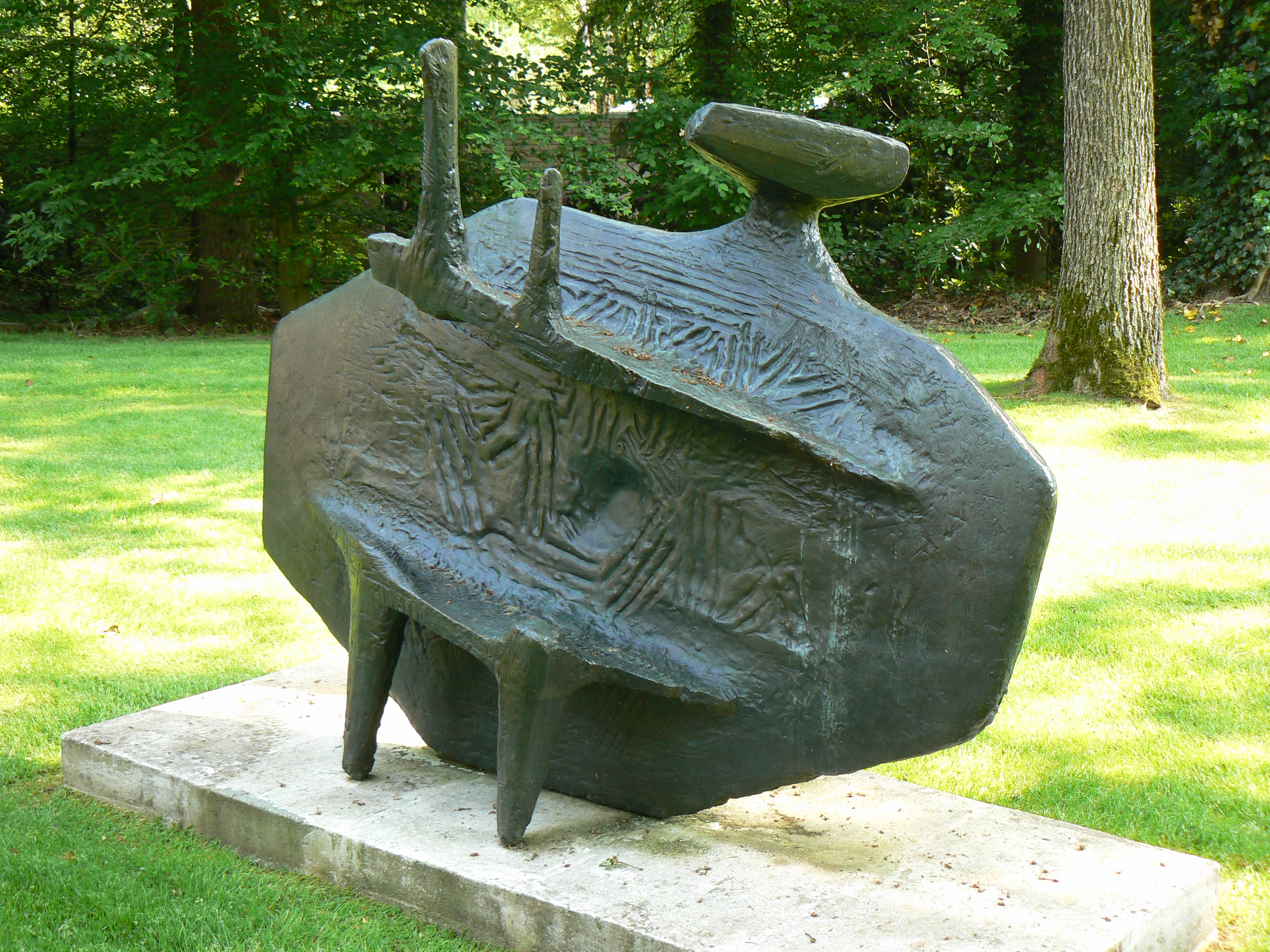
Monitor (1961), Otterlo The Netherlands

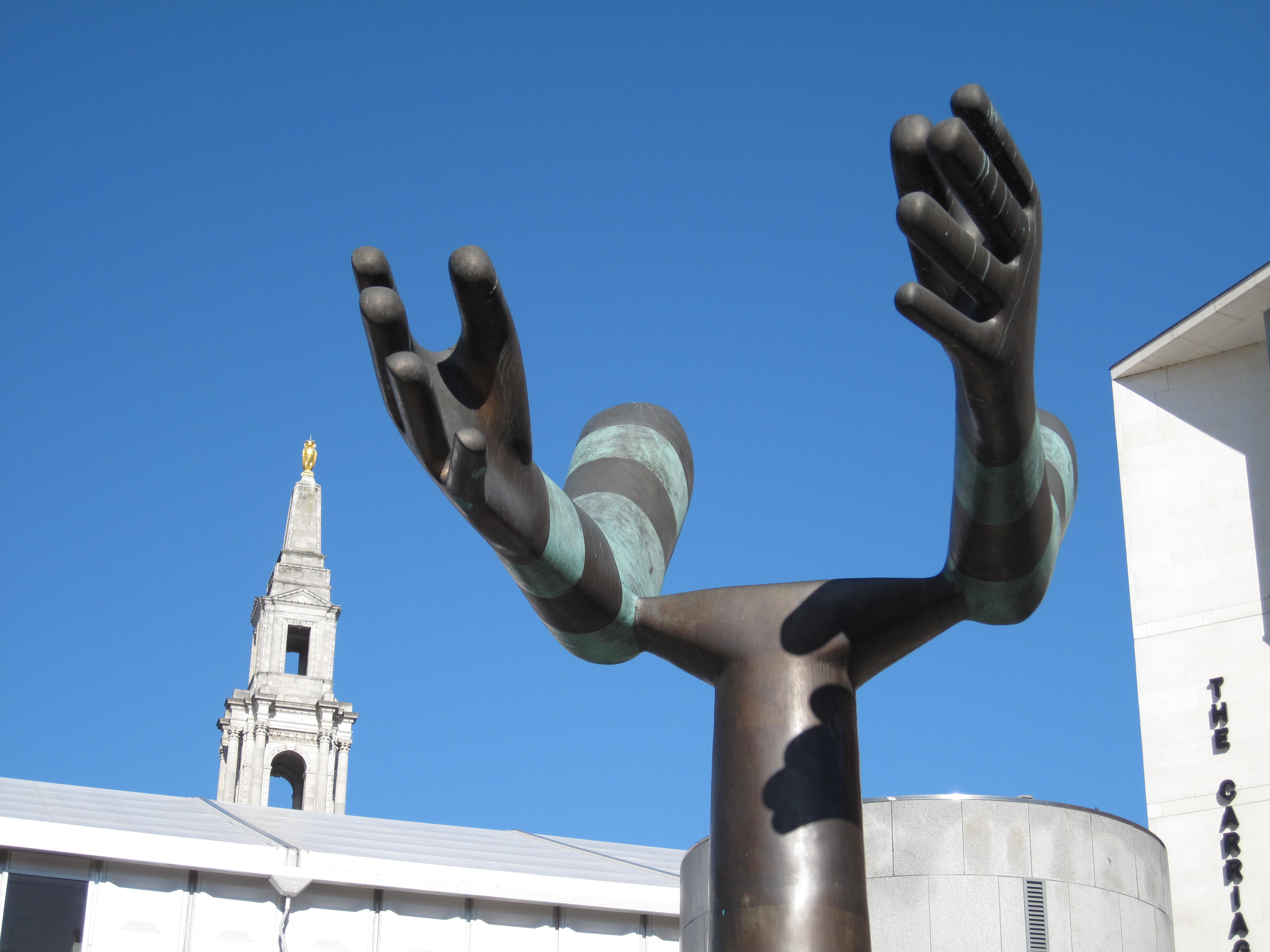
Both Arms (2001) Leeds, UK

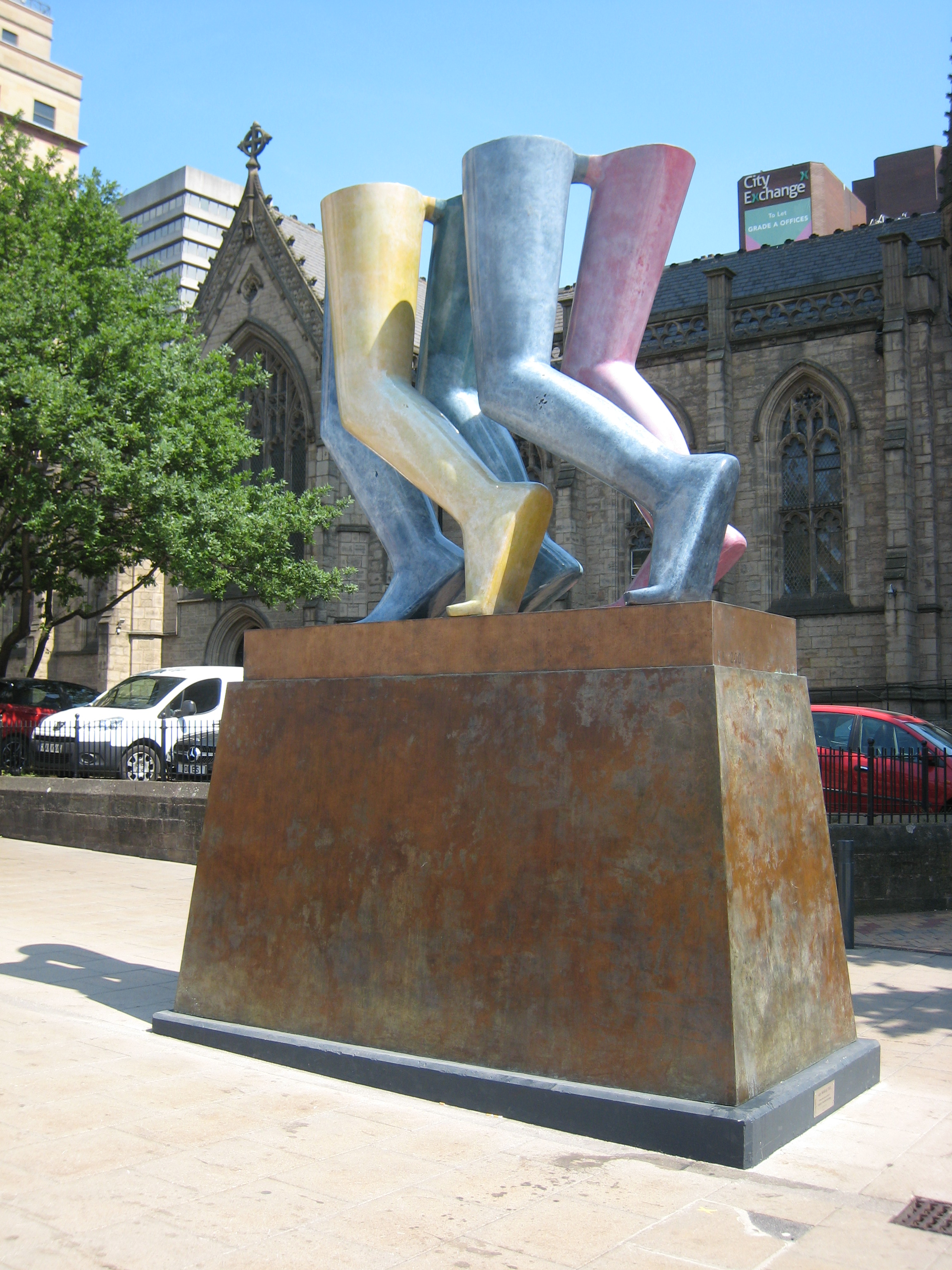
Legs Walking 2001 (2001) Leeds, UK

== Exhibition ==
- 1960: Kenneth Armitage - Lynn Chadwick, Kestner-Gesellschaft, Hannover, Germany
- 1963: Kenneth Armitage - Galerie Charles Lienhard, Zurich, Switzerland
