= Arithmeum =

Museum in Bonn, Germany

Coordinates: 50°43′50″N 7°6′18″E

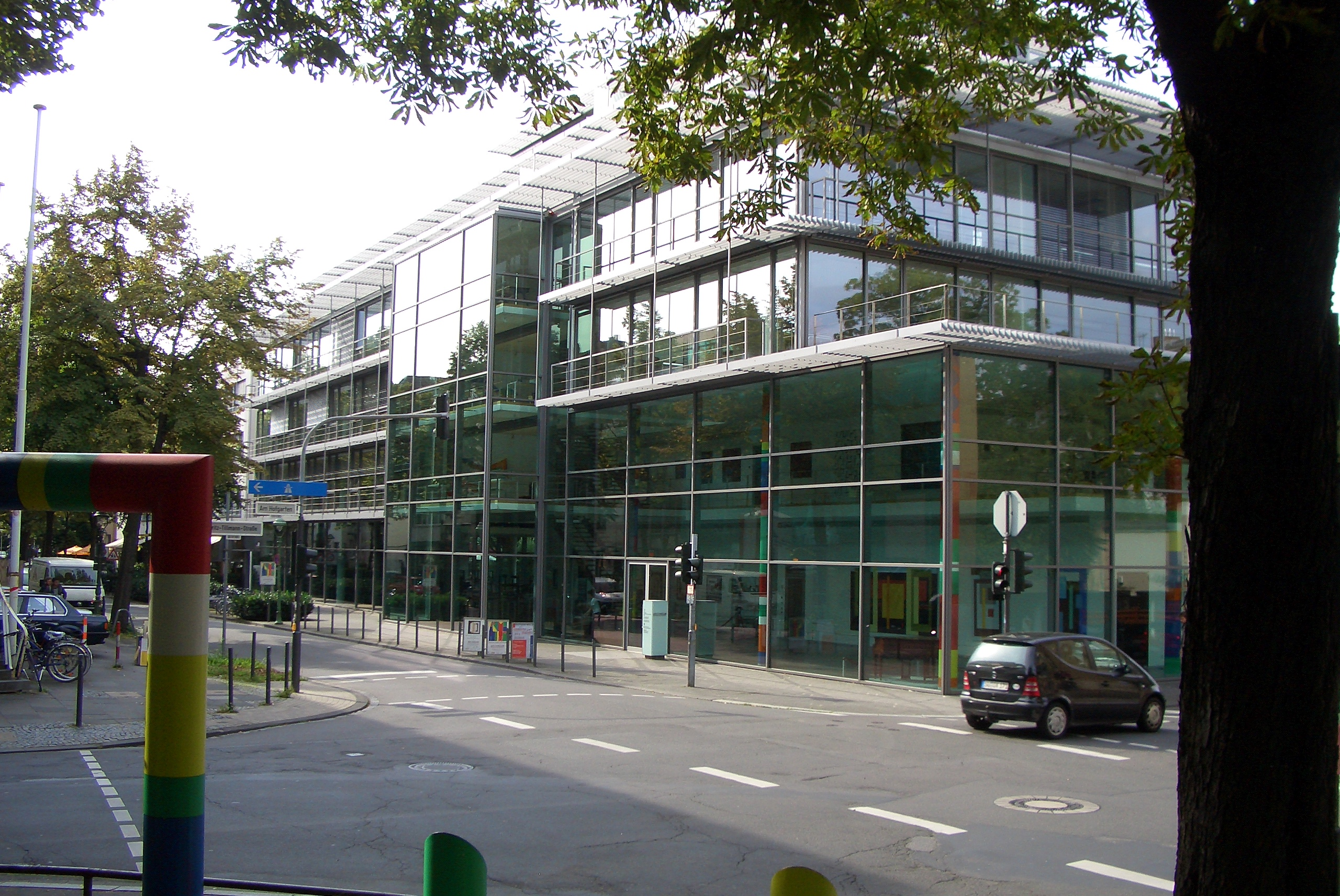
Façade of the museum

The Arithmeum is a mathematics museum owned by the Forschungsinstitut für Diskrete Mathematik (Research Institute for Discrete Mathematics) at the University of Bonn.

It was founded in 2008 by the director of the institute, Bernhard Korte, who contributed his private collection of calculating machines.

The building's steel-glass facade – located at Lennéstrasse 2 – is meant to represent the "transparency of science".

== Exhibitions ==
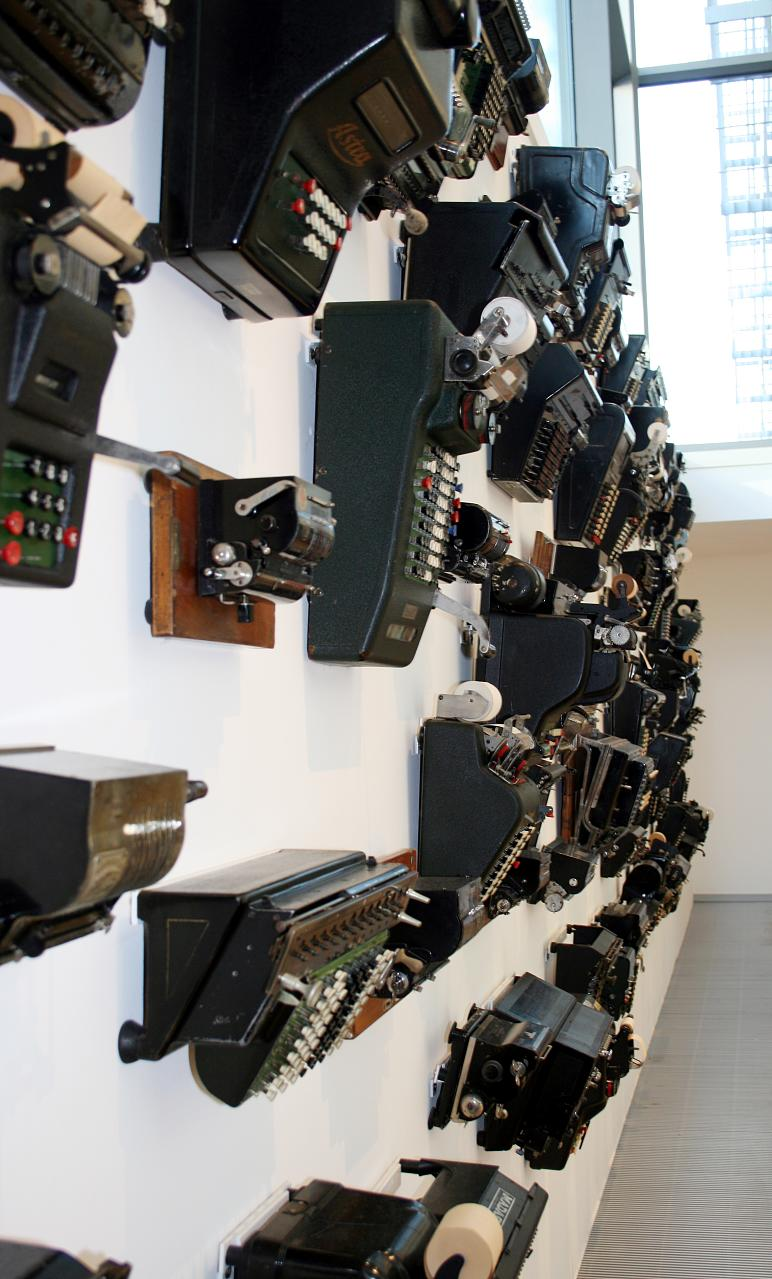
Calculators in the Arithmeum

The permanent exhibit "Calculating in Olden and Modern Times" (German: Rechnen Einst und Heute) shows the progression of mechanical calculating machines through 1,200 pieces.

It holds the very large (4,000 pieces), IJzebrand Schuitema (1929–2013) 400 year collection of slide rules.

There are also exhibits on very-large-scale integrated (VLSI) logic chips, historical arithmetic books dating back to Johannes Gutenberg's times, and the relationship between art and science.
