= Rebecca Ackroyd =

British artist (born 1987)

- Born: 1987 (age 38–39); Cheltenham, UK
- Education: Byam Shaw School of Art; Royal Academy of Arts
- Known for: Sculpture, drawings
- Website: RebeccaAckroyd.com; Rebecca Ackroyd, Peres Projects

Rebecca Ackroyd (born 1987) is a British artist best known for her painting and sculptural works. She lives and works between London and Berlin.

== Early life, education, and commercial success ==
Ackroyd was born in Cheltenham and received degrees from the Byam Shaw School of Art and the Royal Academy of Arts in London. Public showings of Ackroyd's art are common, including a solo exhibition, Shutter Speed, at the Mac Lyon, running from September 22, 2023, to January 7, 2024.

Ackroyd's debut at Christie's Contemporary Art Sale 2023 was part of a record-setting showing for women in the auction. Her painting “Garden Tender” sold for $56,700, twice its estimated price.

== Reviews and artistic themes ==
Reviewers have noted that Ackroyd's art focuses on depictions of the female body. "Ackroyd seems to suggest that it is the shapeshifting potential of femininity itself that can be wielded like a sword," Chloe Stead, assistant editor of frieze, wrote regarding Ackroyd's solo exhibition 100mph at Peres Projects in Berlin.

Thomas Elmer called Ackroyd "one of the most exciting artists in the UK" in an introduction to a 2022 interview for Sculpture magazine.

== Selected collections ==
Museums that include Ackroyd's work in their collections include Aïshti Foundation, Musée d'art contemporain de Lyon, Selfridges, Oxford Street, Sifang Art Museum, Stahl Collection, and Zabludowicz Collection.
