= Paul Erich Küppers =

German art historian

Paul Küppers (19 October 1889 – 7 January 1922) was a German art historian and first husband of Sophie Lissitzky-Küppers. He was a co-founder of the Kestner Society and brought contemporary art to Hanover.

== Life ==
Born in Essen, Küppers was the son of a geometer and surveyor who later owned a mine.

Küppers attended the Hermann Lietz School in Haubinda and published a first volume of poems from there in 1907. After his father's company went bankrupt, he moved to Hamm. In 1909, he began studying art history at LMU Munich, with Heinrich Wölfflin among others. In 1909, he became active in the Corps Isaria. There in 1911 he met Sophie Schneider; they married in 1916. To continue his studies, he went to the Eberhard-Karls-University, where he was reciprocated on 1 November 1910 (with Otto Springorum) in the Corps Rhenania Tübingen. When he was inactive, he moved to the Christian Albrechts University in Kiel. Sick of tuberculosis, he spent a year of convalescence in the Black Forest. He then studied the panel paintings by Domenico Ghirlandaio at the Art History Institute in Florence. Engaged since 1913, Küppers wrote his doctoral thesis on Ghirlandaio in Kiel.

From there he finally went to Hanover, where he initially assisted the later museum director Albert Brinckmann in the numismatic cabinet of the Kestner Museum. Shortly before his wedding in September 1916, in the middle of the First World War, Küppers became a co-founder of the Kestner Society, an institution established to introduce new, innovative artists in the city of Hannover, on 10 June 1916, chaired by Albert Brinckmann. Küppers was the first director of the Kestner Society (Kestner-Gesellschaft).

Despite the war and economically difficult times, Küppers managed a successful art exhibition of modern and contemporary art with the support of the progressive part of the Hanoverian art scene, including artists such as Max Slevogt, Paula Modersohn-Becker or Emil Nolde. Küppers himself wrote numerous catalog texts and articles in magazines. His Die Tafelbilder des Domenico Ghirlandajo was published in 1916. After he wrote the book Der Kubismus Ein künstlerisches Formproblem unserer Zeit, which was published in 1919 under the direction of Küppers. Küppers founded the Kestner stage with Karl Aloys Schenzinger.

In 1922, Küppers died in Hanover and his widow Sophie, met and fell in love with the Russian Constructivist artist El Lissitzky, whom she followed to the Soviet Union in 1926 and married a year later. Paintings from Küpper's art collection were plundered by the Nazis, including Klee' “Swamp Legend” (1919), which Küppers is believed to have acquired directly from the artist.

== Literature ==
- Wieland Schmied (Hrsg.): Trailblazer for modern art. 50 years of the Kestner Society, with contributions by Sophie Küppers-Lissitzky and others, Hanover: Fackelträger-Verlag, 1966, p. 252
- Sophie Küppers-Lissitzky: The first years, in Wieland Schmied (Hrsg.): Trailblazer to modern art. 50 Years of the Kestner Society, Hanover: Fackelträger-Verlag, 1966, pp. 11–26
- Ines Katenhusen : Art and Politics. Hanover's confrontations with modernity in the Weimar Republic, at the same time a dissertation at the University of Hanover under the title Understanding a time is perhaps best gained from her art, in the series Hanoverian Studies, series of publications by the Hanover City Archives, Volume 5, Hanover: Hahn, 1998, ISBN 3-7752-4955-9, pp. 258–260 et al.
- Hugo Thielen : KÜPPERS (1), Paul Erich. In: Dirk Böttcher, Klaus Mlynek, Waldemar R. Röhrbein, Hugo Thielen: Hannoversches Biographisches Lexikon . From the beginning to the present. Schlütersche, Hannover 2002, ISBN 3-87706-706-9, p. 216 and others; online through google books
- Hugo Thielen: Küppers, (1), Paul Erich (with changes compared to the Biographical Lexicon ), in: Klaus Mlynek, Waldemar R. Röhrbein (ed.) U. a .: City Lexicon Hanover . From the beginning to the present. Schlütersche, Hannover 2009, ISBN 978-3-89993-662-9, p. 375.
