= Rupprecht Geiger =

German artist (1908–2009)

Rupprecht Geiger (26 January 1908 – 6 December 2009) was a German abstract painter and sculptor. Throughout his career, he favored monochromicity and color-field paintings. For a time, he concentrated solely on the color red.

== Life and work ==
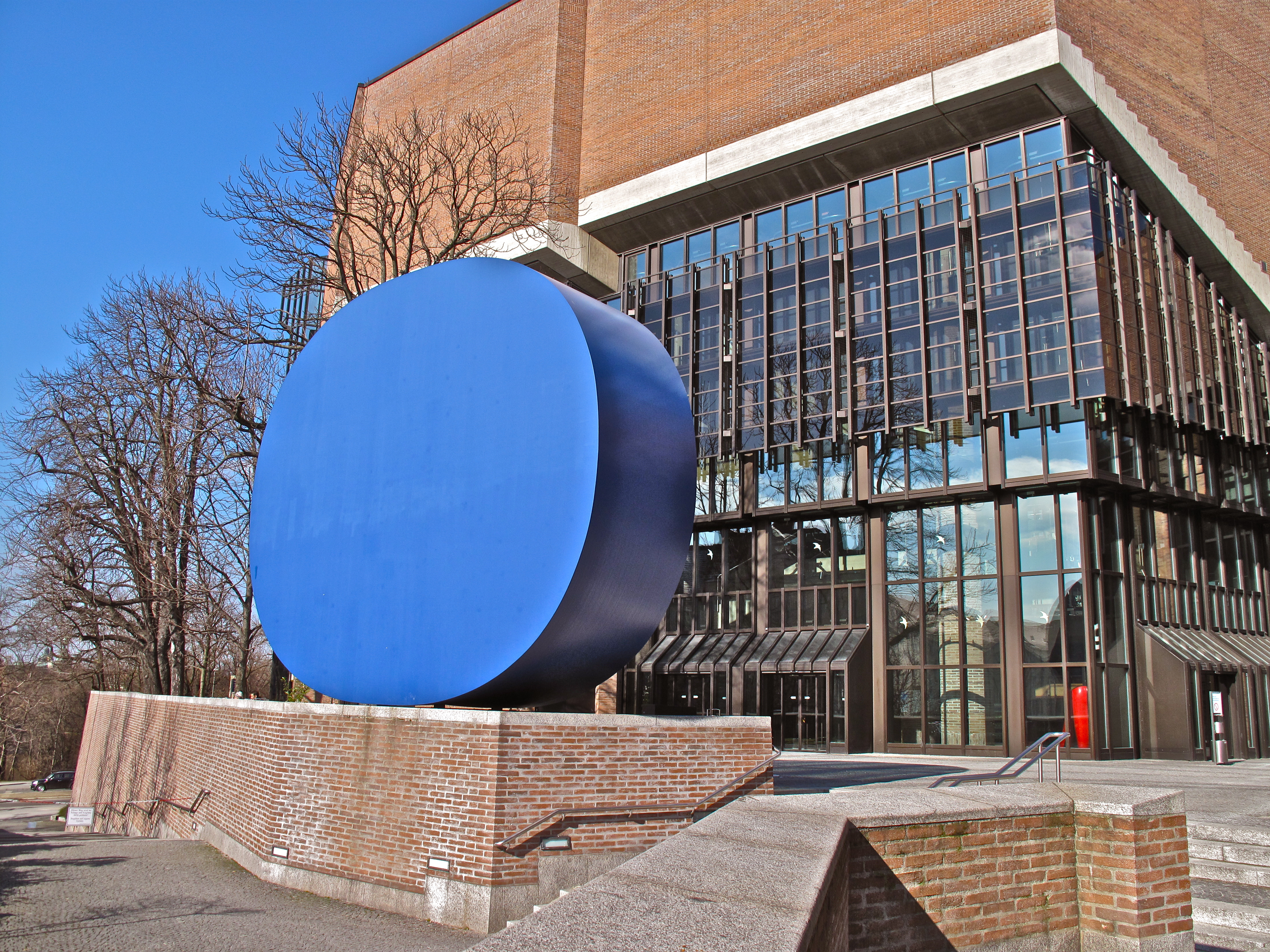
Sculpture of Rupprecht Geiger in Munich

Geiger was born in Munich, the only child of painter Willi Geiger. Besides Germany, the family spent time in Spain, and he also joined his father on trips to Morocco and the Canary Islands. It was on these trips that Geiger began painting. From 1926 through 1935, he studied and taught architecture and art at academic institutions in Munich. From 1936 to 1940, he worked as an architect at several firms, also in Munich. He was called up to fight in World War II and was at the Eastern Front in Poland and Russia, and then in 1943 and 1944 he was a war illustrator in Ukraine and Greece. He exhibited his first abstract painting in 1948.

After the war, from 1949 to 1962, he was again active as an architect. In 1949, Geiger co-founded the Munich artists' group ZEN 49. Hilla von Rebay chose to exhibit his artwork at the Museum for Non-Objective Painting (later the Guggenheim Foundation).

From 1965 to 1976, Geiger was professor of painting at Staatlichen Kunstakademie Düsseldorf.

His paintings are often concerned with the theme of color. In the 1950s, he particularly studied the color red. Geiger's paintings are characterized by simple geometric forms (rectangles, ovals, circles), bright colors, and intense contrasts. The Diozesanmuseum Freising near Munich possesses a collection of his works.

== Exhibitions ==
Major international exhibitions of Rupprecht Geiger's long career included four in the German city of Kassel:

- documenta II (1959)
- documenta III (1964)
- 4. documenta (1968)
- documenta 6 (1977)

== Awards ==
In 1989, Geiger earned the Cultural Honor Prize of the City of Munich. In 1992, he was awarded The Rubens Prize of the City of Siegen, in 1995 the Oberbayerischer Kulturpreis, and in 1997 the Goldene Ehrenmünze der Landeshauptstadt München.

== See also ==
- List of German painters
