= Jorge Castillo (artist) =

Spanish painter

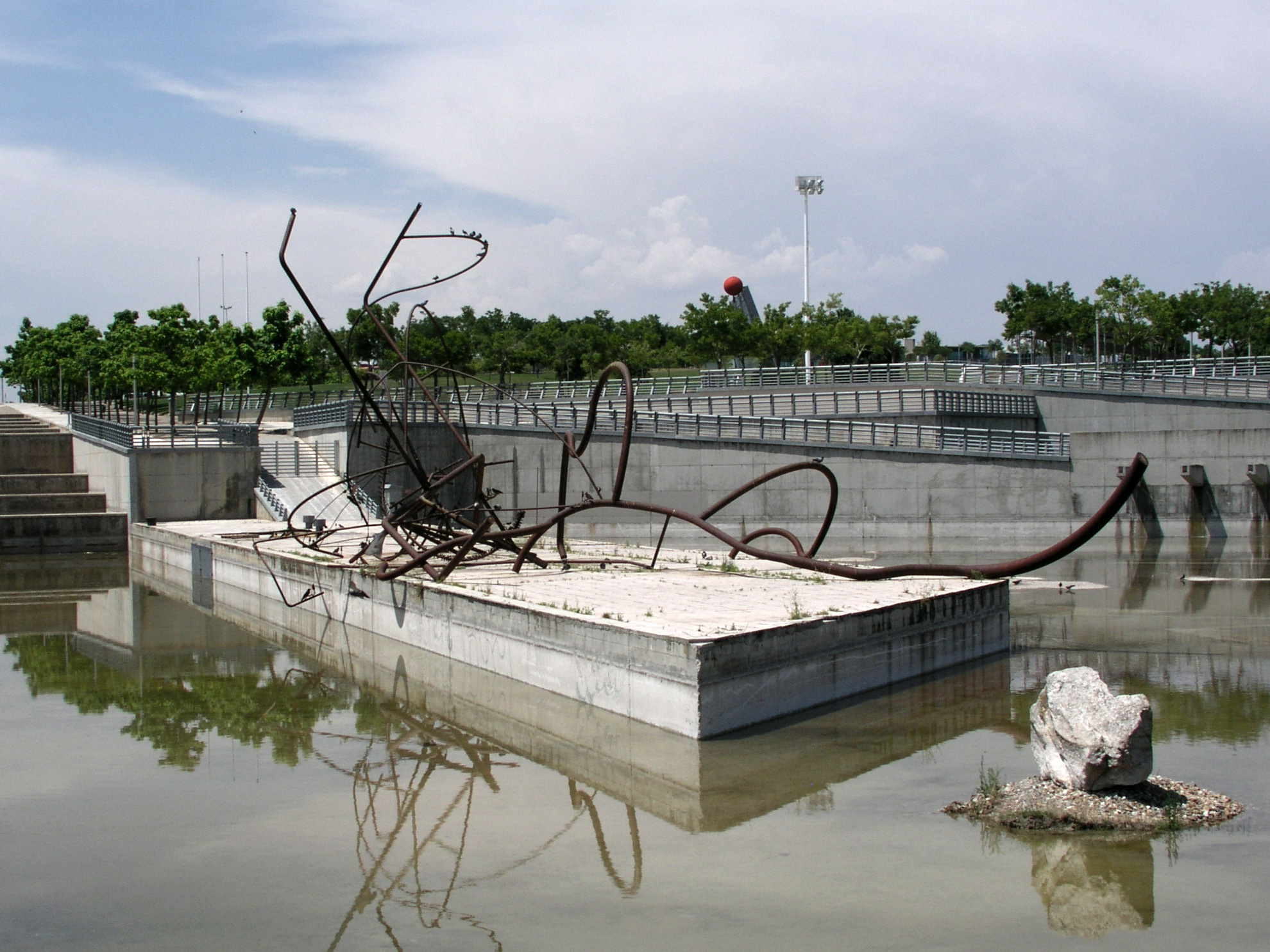
Parque de Juan Carlos I, Madrid, Spain. "Paseo entre dos árboles", by Jorge Castillo.

Jorge José Castillo Casalderrey (born June 16, 1933) is a Spanish-born painter and sculptor.

For most of his childhood, he and his family lived in Argentina. Since 1962, he has maintained residences in both Barcelona and New York City.

Castillo greatly admired Pablo Picasso, and that influence shows in his paintings, etchings, and lithographs.

His steel sculpture Homage to the Cyclist stands in the Plaça de Sants in Barcelona.
