= Rosfinmonitoring =

Russian government agency

Federal Financial Monitoring Service
- Федеральная служба по финансовому мониторингу
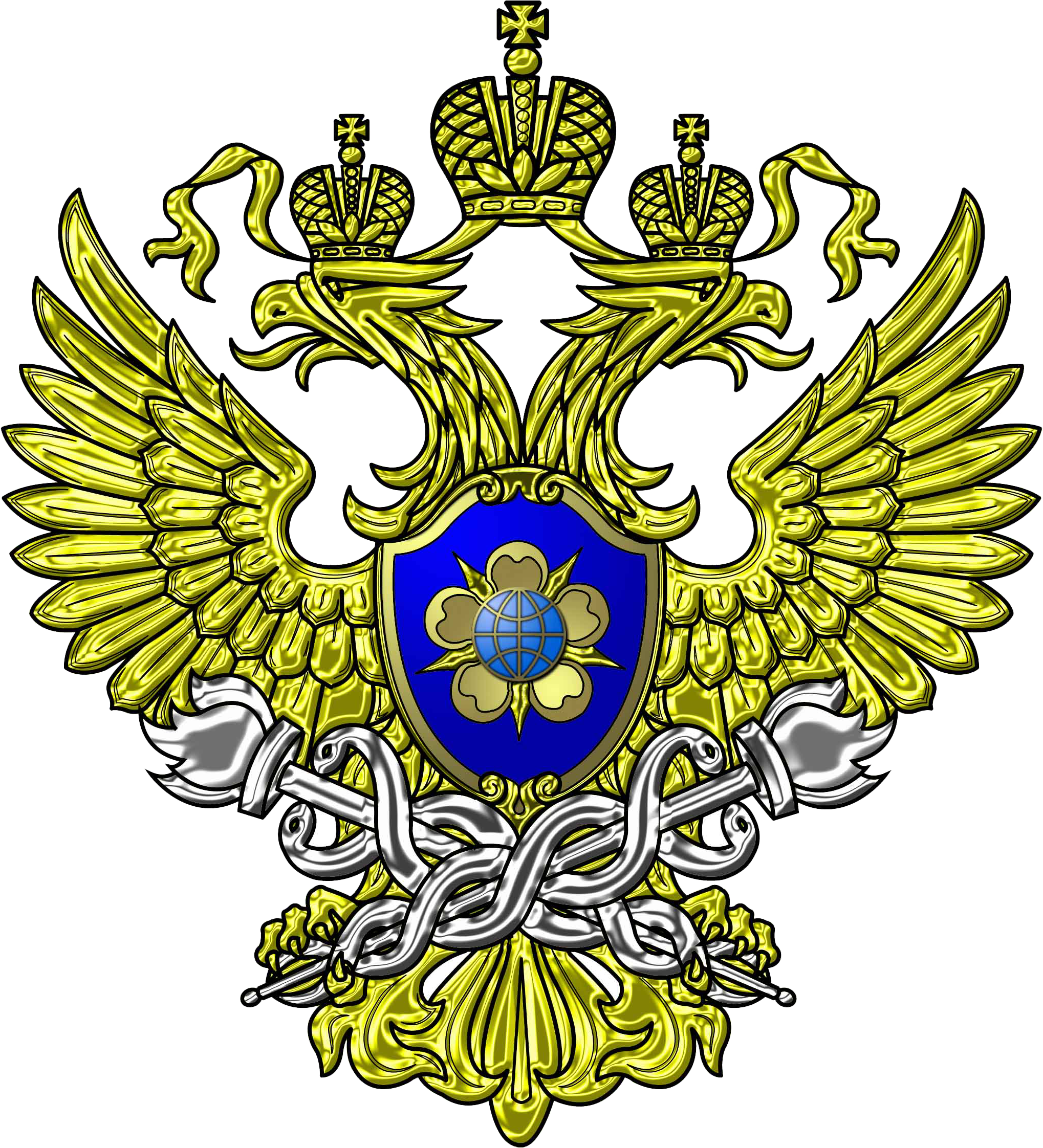
- Coat of arms

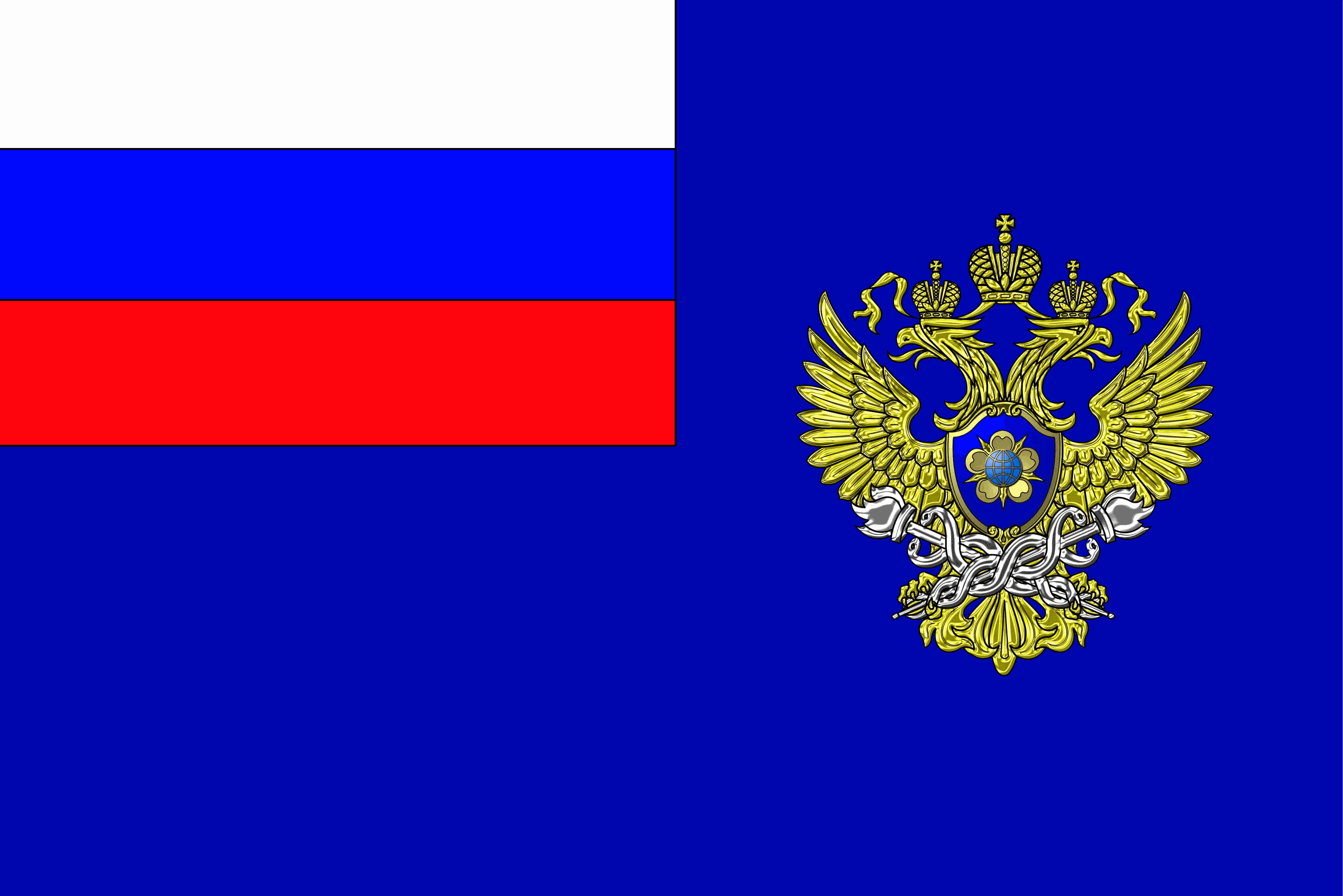
- Flag

Agency overview
- Formed: 1 November 2001 (as Committee for Financial Monitoring of Russia)
- Headquarters: K-450, D.39 Myasnitskaya Street, Moscow
- Agency executive: Director, Yuri Chikhanchin
- Parent agency: Presidential Administration of Russia
- Website: www.fedsfm.ru

The Federal Financial Monitoring Service of the Russian Federation (Russian: Федеральная служба по финансовому мониторингу), known as Rosfinmonitoring (Росфинмониторинг), is a Federal Service that was created by a decree of President Vladimir Putin of 1 November 2001, and aimed to collect and analyze information about financial transactions in order to combat domestic and international money laundering, terrorism financing, and other financial crimes. The organization also provides lists of people accused of terrorist or "extremist" activities and books.

From 1 November 2001, to 9 March 2004, it was called Financial Monitoring Committee (Комитет по финансовому мониторингу). It has been led by Viktor Zubkov from the very beginning.

Rosfinmonitoring is considered as Russia's main body for financial intelligence.

== History ==
Under Presidential Decree No. 1263 from 1 November 2001 "On the authorized body to counteract the legalization (laundering) of proceeds of crime", the Committee for Financial Monitoring of Russia (Комитет Российской Федерации по финансовому мониторингу) was born. The Presidential Decree came into force on 1 February 2002.

Following the adoption in September 2002 amendments to the Federal Law "On Combating Legalization (Laundering) of Proceeds from Crime and Financing of Terrorism", The Financial Monitoring Committee (KFM of Russia) functions have been enhanced with countering terrorism financing.

One of the committee's functions was to improve Russia's image in the international community: Russia at the time was in the "black list" of FATF. Through the efforts of FMK in October 2002, Russia was removed from the "black list", and in June 2003 the Committee became a member of the FATF.

On 9 March 2004, The Presidential Decree No. 314 ("On system and structure of the federal organs of the executive authority") The Committee for Financial Monitoring transformed into the Federal Service for Financial Monitoring (Rosfinmonitoring).

Pavel Durov's meme reaction to his inclusion on Rosfinmonitoring's terrorist registry, posted on his Telegram in 2026, contrasting his label as a "terrorist" with Russian foreign minister Sergey Lavrov shaking hands with Taliban leaders as "respected partners".

Until September 2007 the Federal Financial Monitoring Service was administered by the Ministry of Finance of the Russian Federation. In accordance with Presidential Decree from 24 September 2007 (No. 1274, "On Issues of the structure of federal executive authorities) The Rosfinmonitoring become subordinate directly to the Government of the Russian Federation.

According to the Decree of the President of the Russian Federation from 21 May 2012 (№ 636; "On the structure of federal executive agencies"), the Federal Service for Financial Monitoring became under the authority of the President of Russia.

In 2022, the US company Meta was added to the list of extremists and terrorists.

== Description ==
Persons or companies included in the list are prohibited to buy or sell property, and to receive inheritance. Their bank accounts are frozen as well as their credit cards.

== Location ==
Rosfinmonitoring is located between the Novokirovsky Prospekt and Myasnitskaya ulitsa, 39 in Moscow at the Tsentrosoyuz building which is named after Centrosoyuz and also houses Rosstat (Russian: Росстат) the Russian Federal State Statistics Service.

== Directors ==
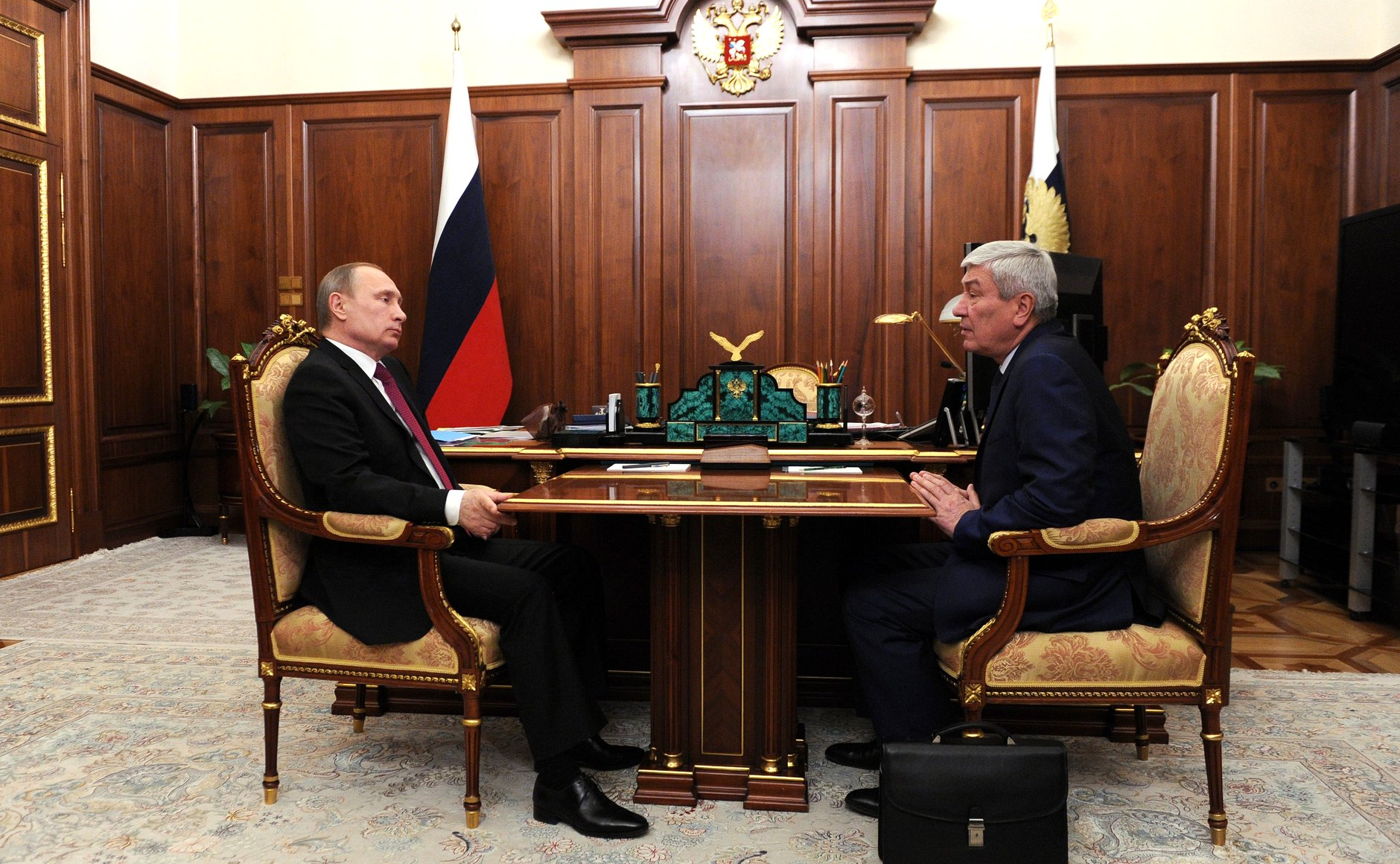
Director Yuri Chikhanchin with Russian President Vladimir Putin in 2015

- Viktor Zubkov (2001–2007), Head of Committee for Financial Monitoring
- Oleg Markov (2007–2008), Head of Rosfinmonitoring
- Yuri Chikhanchin (Since 2008), Director

== See also ==
- Moneyval – European equivalent
- FINTRAC – Canada's equivalent
- FinCEN – American equivalent
- AUSTRAC – Australian equivalent.
- Egmont Group of Financial Intelligence Units
- Asia/Pacific Group on Money Laundering
- Financial Action Task Force on Money Laundering
- List of organizations designated as terrorist or extremist by Russia
- Transnational repression by Russia
