= RED7 (Moscow) =

Building in Moscow, Russia

Coordinates: 55.7712°N 37.6437°E

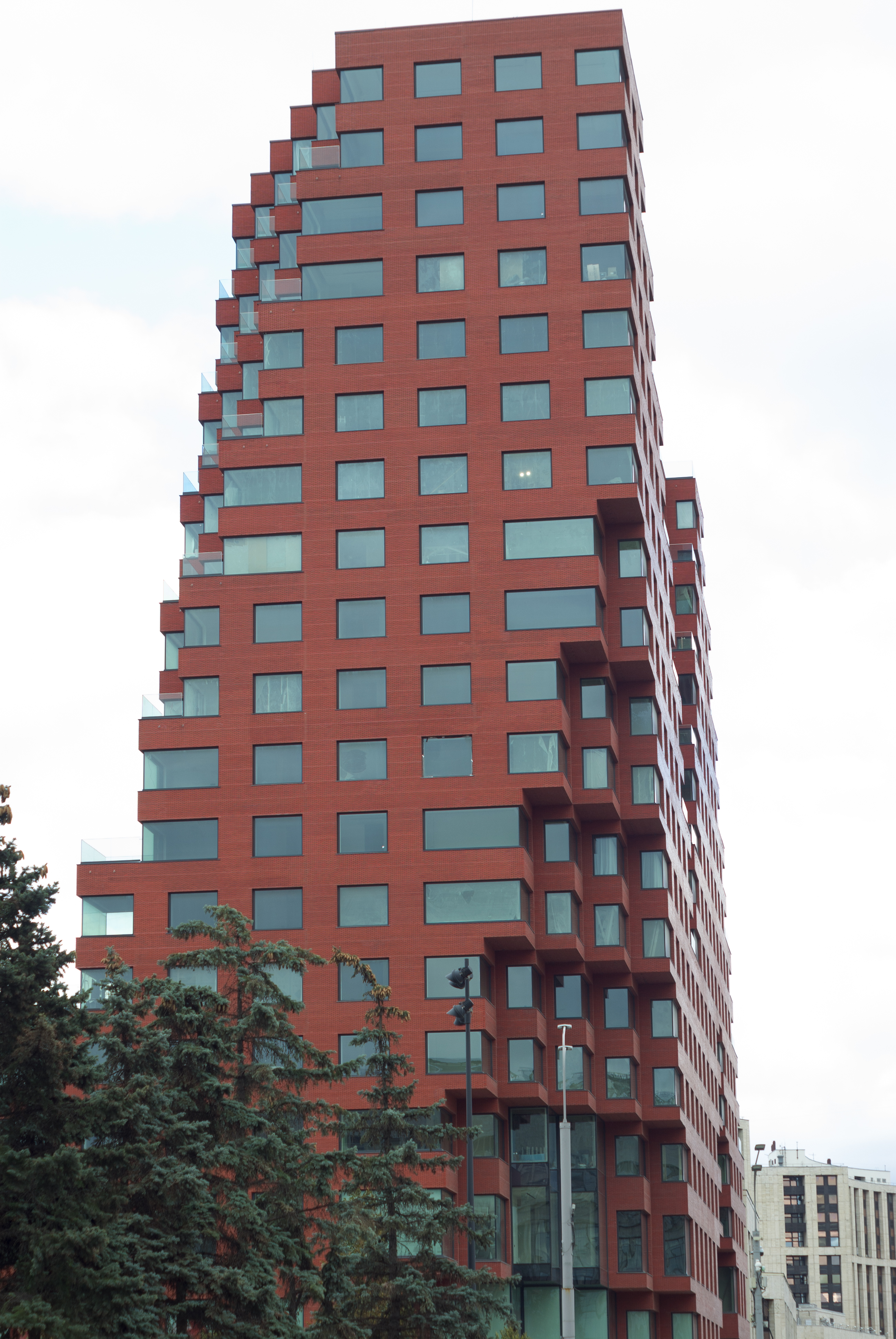
- Side facade of RED7 in 2025

General information
- Location: Moscow, Russia
- Groundbreaking: November 2018
- Completed: 2024
- Owner: GK Osnova

Height
- Architectural: 78 m

Technical details
- Floor count: 19
- Floor area: 46,000 m2

Design and construction
- Architects: MVRDV, APEX Project Bureau

RED7 is a mixed-use apartment building in Moscow designed by Dutch architecture firm MVRDV.

== History ==
Real estate developer GK Osnova organised a design competition for the plot along the Academician Sakharov Avenue, which was won by MVRDV in December 2017. It was the first approved project in Russia for the architecture firm. MVRDV collaborated with local architecture firm APEX project bureau. The interior was designed by Sabine Marcelis, i29 architects and Oleg Klodt.

Due to the political circumstances concerning the Russo-Ukrainian war, communication between MVRDV and the local firm was halted in February 2022. The building was originally planned to be finished in 2022, but was finally completed in 2024.

== Design ==
The building is characterised by its pixel architecture, with a prominent grid in the windows. The edges of the building are cut away towards the top and bottom, making the façade look diagonal. The façade is made up of red ceramic, drawing inspiration from nearby constructivist buildings, like the Ministry of Agriculture's Narkomzem building by Alexey Shchusev opposite the street and Le Corbusier's Tsentrosoyuz Building. The building was likened to the video game Minecraft by ArchDaily due to its blocky structure.

== Gallery ==
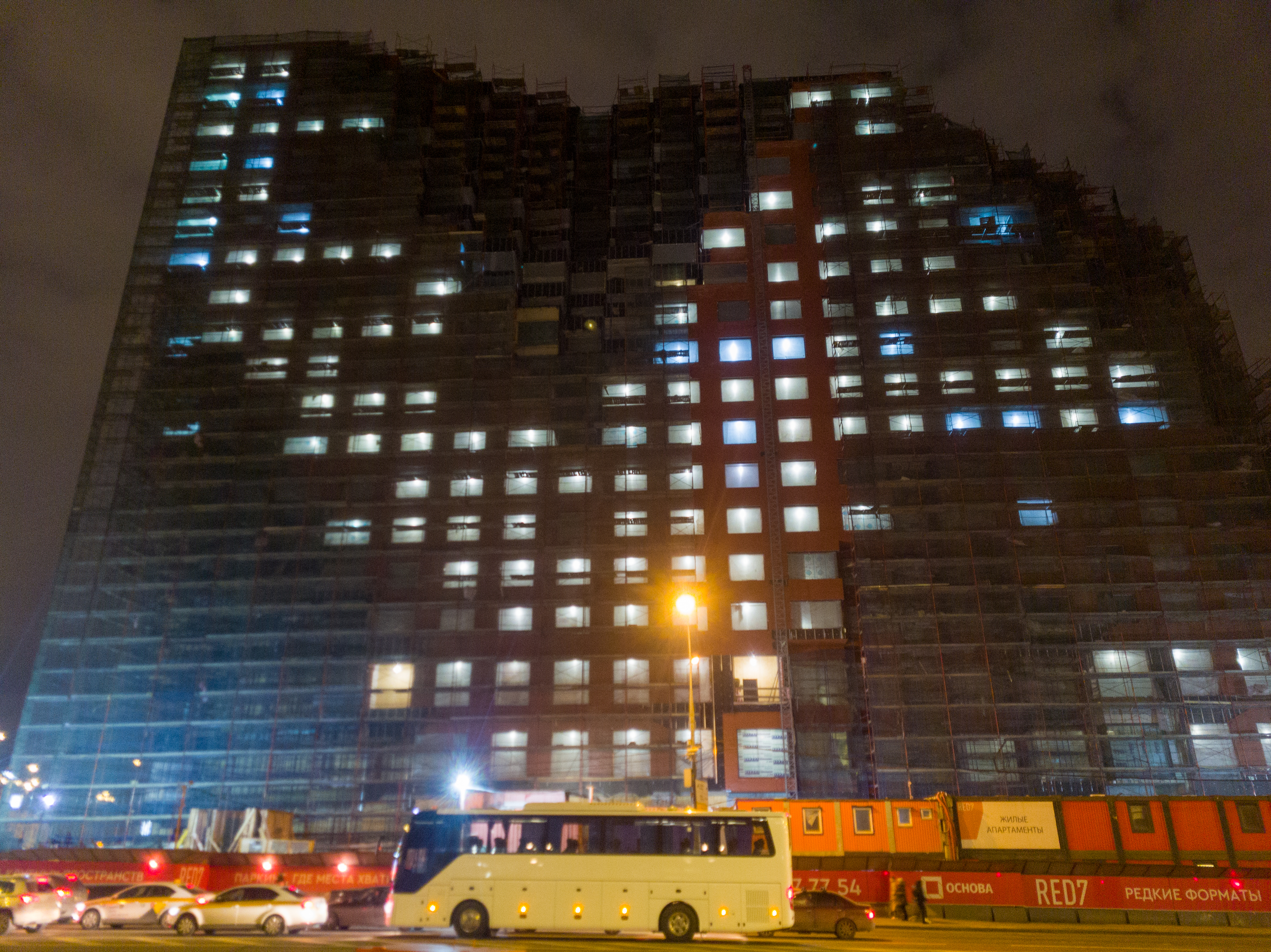
RED7 under construction (March 2023)

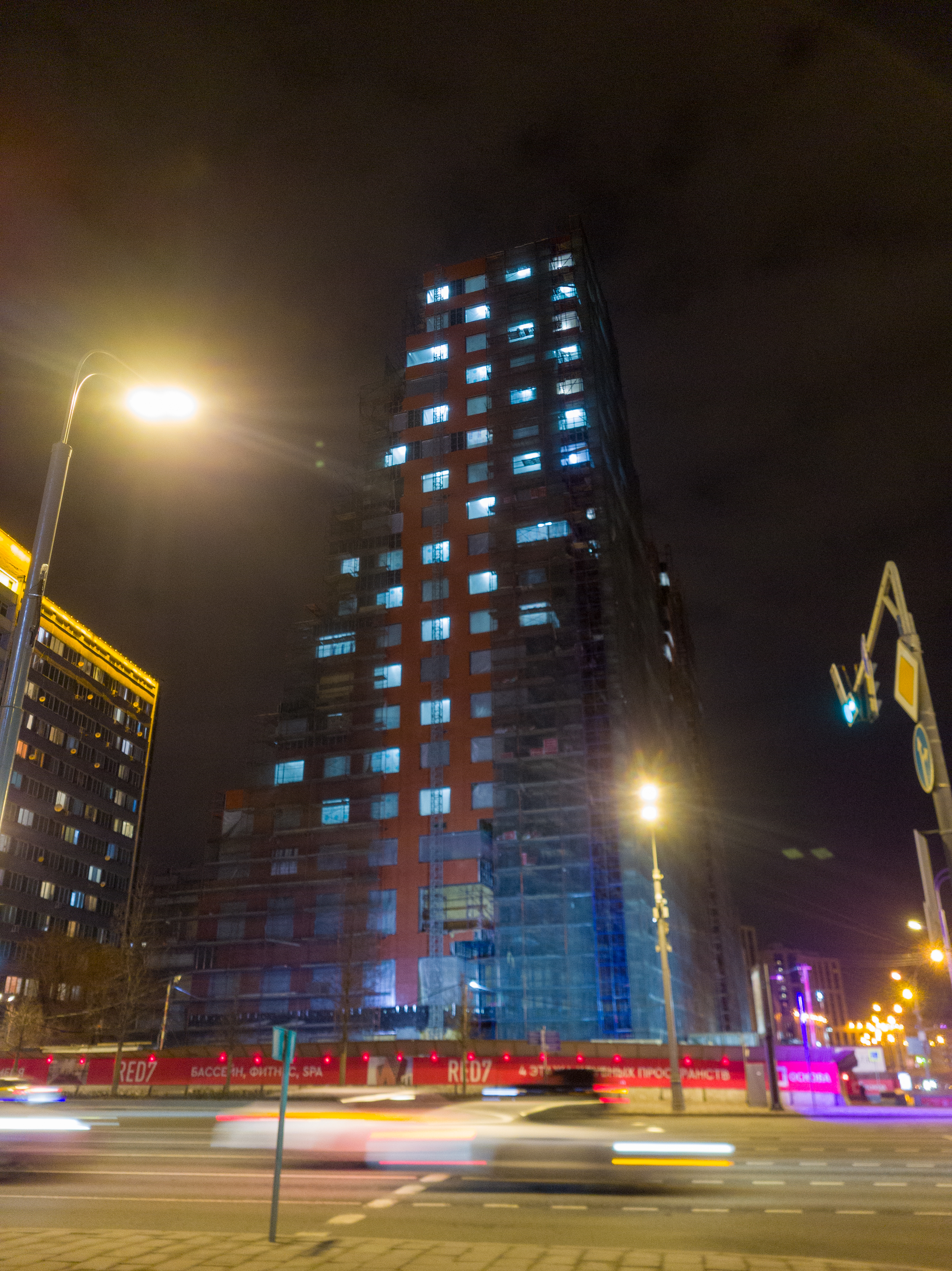
RED7 under construction (March 2023)

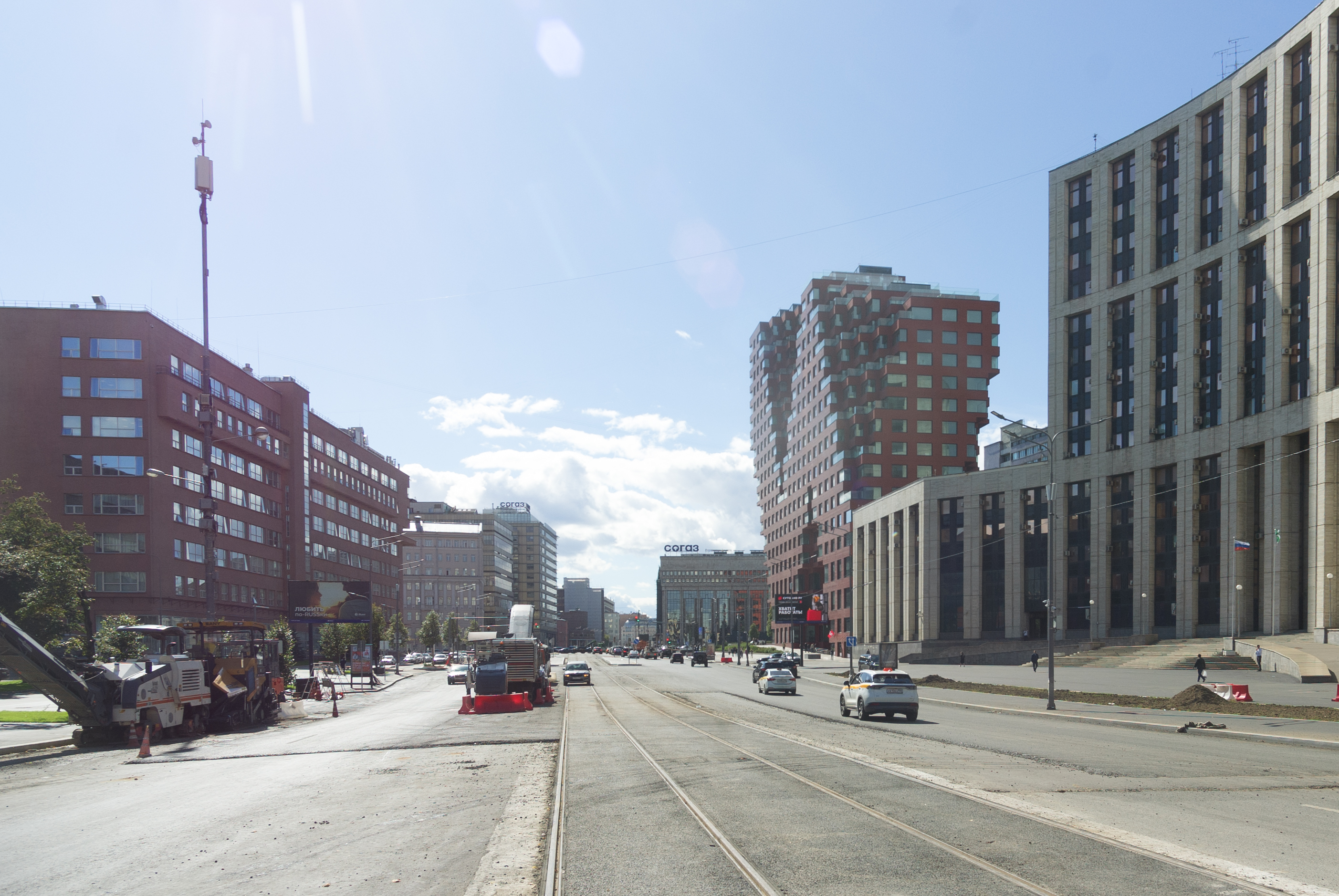
Academician Sakharov Avenue with RED7 on the right (August 2025)
