= Opačić =

Opačić or Opacic is a Serbian surname. Notable people with the surname include:

- German Opačić (1857–1899), Serbian Orthodox prelate
- Milanka Opačić (born 1968), Croatian politician
- Milan Opačić (born 1960), Serbian basketball player and coach
- Paul Opacic (born 1966), British actor
- Rade Opačić (born 1997), Serbian kickboxer
- Suzie Opacic (born 1988), English snooker player
- Tom Opacic (born 1994), Australian rugby footballer

== See also ==
- Opačić, Bosnia and Herzegovina, a village near Glamoč
