= Beat the Whites with the Red Wedge =

Poster by El Lissitzky

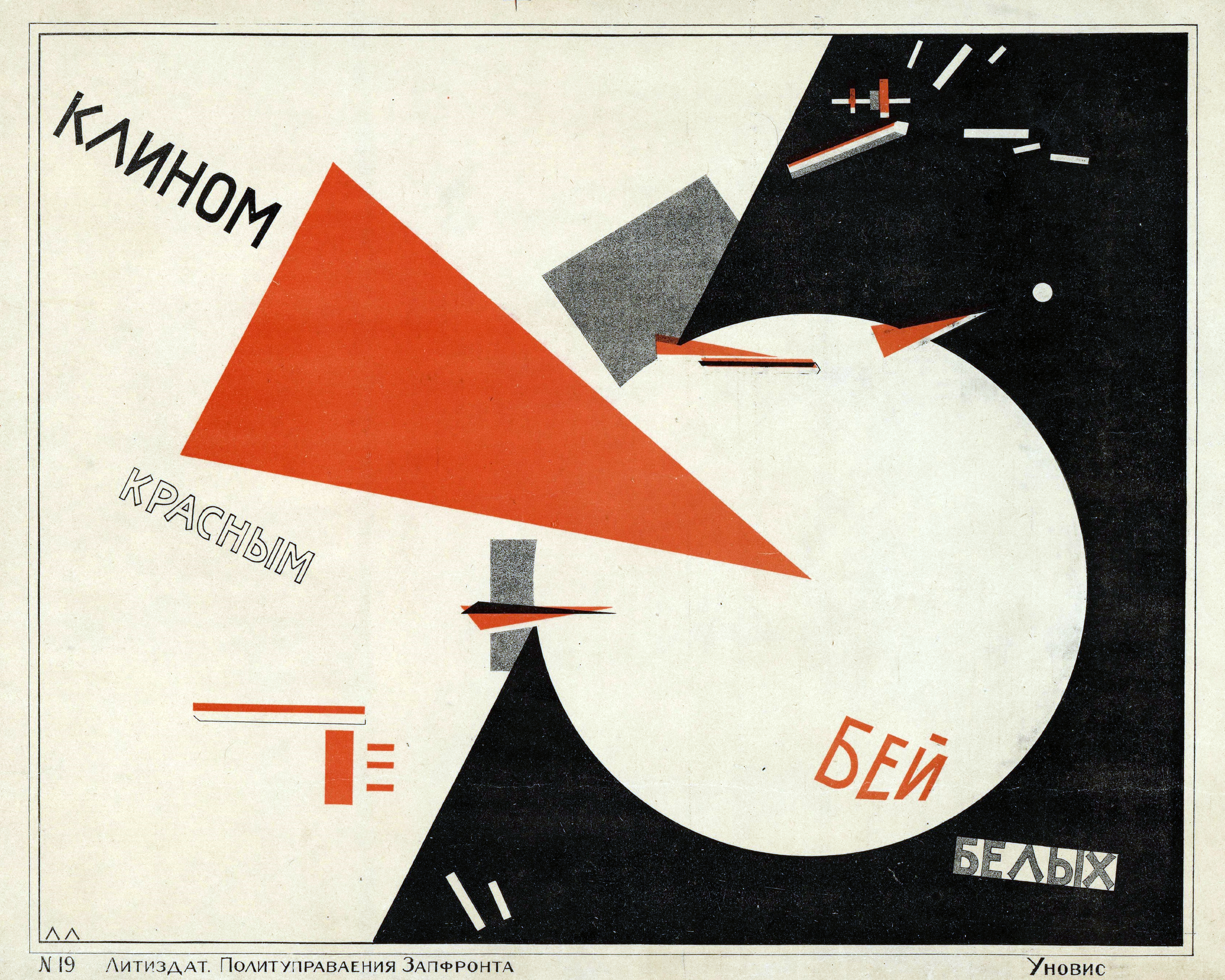
- Beat the Whites with the Red Wedge
- Artist: El Lissitzky
- Year: 1919
- Medium: lithographic
- Subject: Defeat of the White movement
- Location: various (print)

Beat the Whites with the Red Wedge (Russian: Клином красным бей белых!, Klinom krasnym bey belykh!) is a 1919 lithographic Bolshevik propaganda poster by El Lissitzky. In the poster, the intrusive red wedge symbolizes the Bolsheviks, who are penetrating and defeating their opponents, the White movement, during the Russian Civil War.

The image gained popularity in the West upon Lissitzky's migration to Germany in 1921. It is considered symbolic of the Russian Civil War in Western publications, and is often used in album art and advertisements. It is also used by left-wing political and activist groups in Europe, alongside the anti-fascist red triangle, a reclaimed symbol from Nazi Germany's persecution of left-wing political groups in Germany and German-occupied Europe.

== History ==
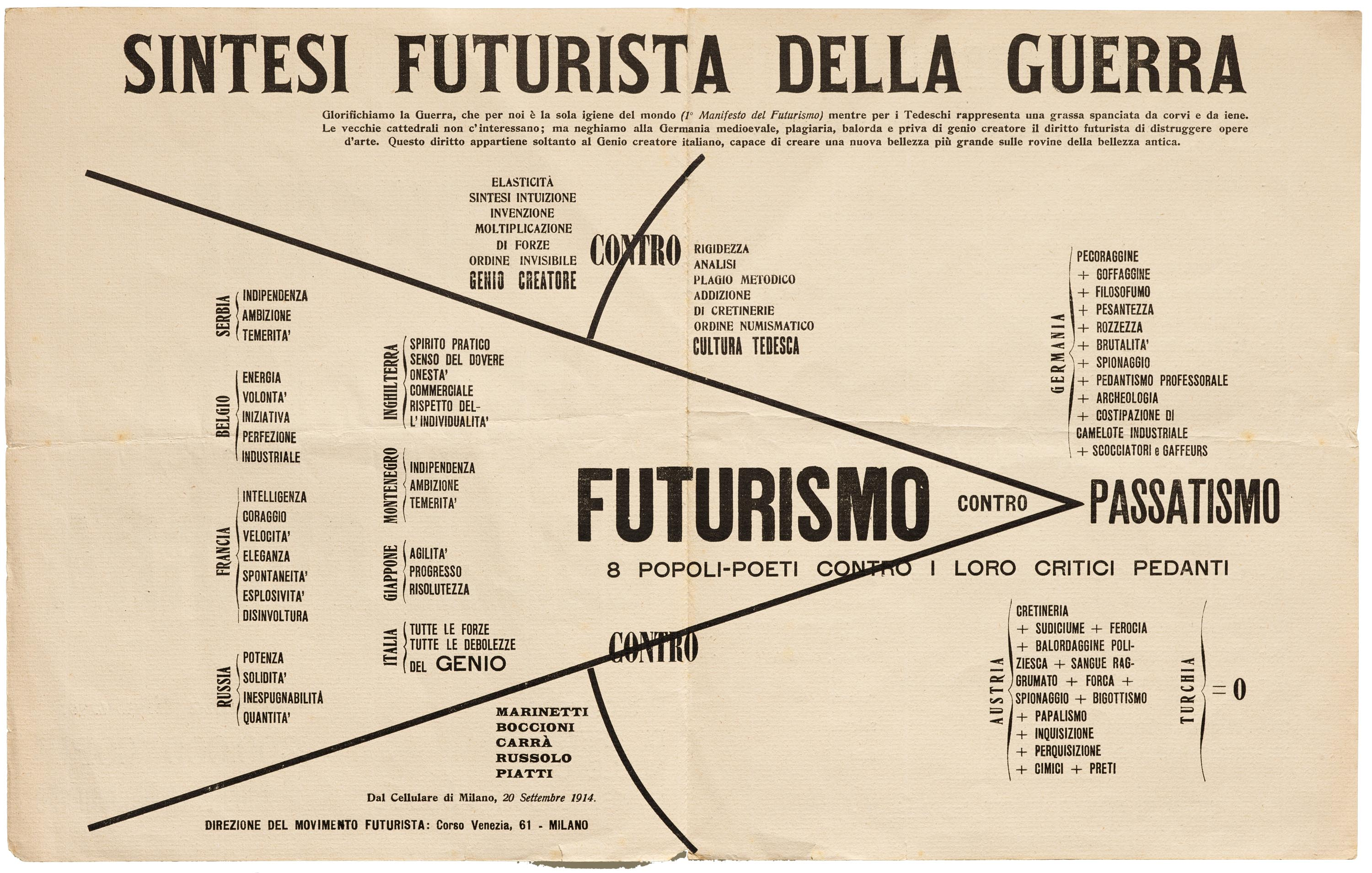
Futurist Synthesis of War, 1914

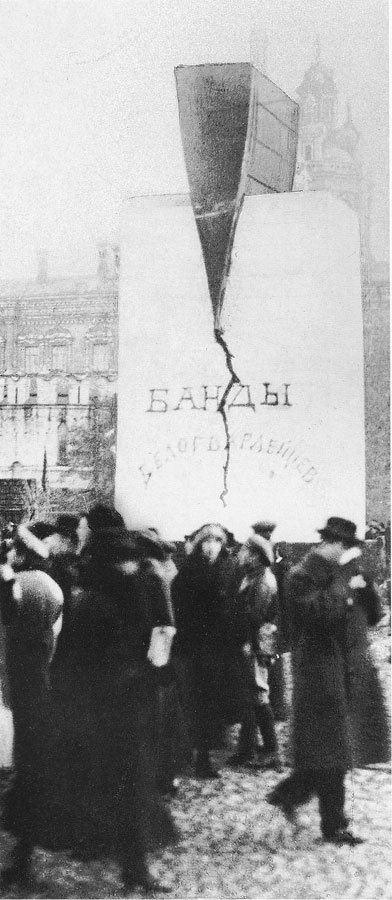
The Red Wedge, Nikolai Kolli, 1918

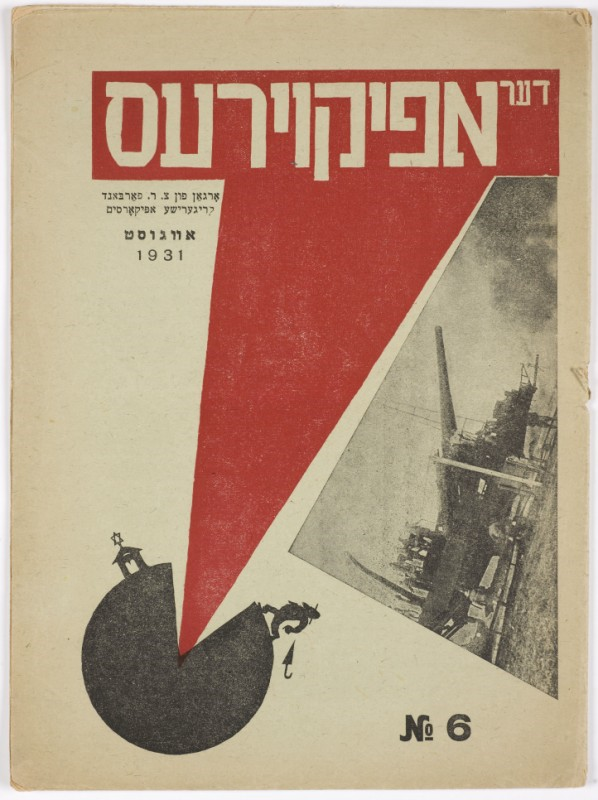
Cover of Der Apikojres № 6 (Yiddish: דער אפיקוירעס) El Lissitzky, 1931

Beat the Whites with the Red Wedge is one of the most famous works by Lissitzky. Lissitzky made it in 1919, when Russia was going through a civil war, which was mainly fought between the "Reds" (communists, socialists and revolutionaries) and the "Whites" (monarchists, conservatives, liberals and other socialists who opposed the Bolshevik Revolution). The name, allegedly recommended by Ilya Ehrenburg, was possibly chosen to counter the Russian pogrom slogan "Beat the Jews!" (Russian: Бей жидов!, romanized: Bej zhidov!). The full slogan was Beat the Jews - save Russia! (Russian: Бей жидов — спасай Россию!), and it was predominantly used by right wing monarchists and their militant Black Hundreds.

According to Sophie Lissitzky-Küppers, in 1945 Pablo Picasso declared that the "painting was not invented for decorating houses, but as a weapon of attack and defence".

Art historian Maria Elena Versari connected Lissitzky's poster with Italian Futurism manifesto Futurist Synthesis of War, published in 20,000 copies in 1914, and signed by Filippo Tommaso Marinetti, Umberto Boccioni, Carlo Carrà, Luigi Russolo, and Ugo Piatti. Lissitzky never mentioned the manifesto, but his friend and colleague Malevich met Marinetti in 1914, and even called him one of the "two pillars, the two 'prisms' of the new art of the twentieth century". Malevich was also well aware of the Italian Futurists works and of Boccioni's theories. In 1916–1917 Malevich, together with artists Alexandra Exter and Olga Rozanova, published two issues of a journal about Cubism and Futurism. Later, in 1918, Malevich wrote: "Cubism and Futurism are the revolutionary banners of art". Also in 1918, young architect Nikolai Kolli created The Red Wedge monument in Moscow. It "consisted of a red triangle vertically inserted as a wedge into a white rectangular block. A very visible crack snakes downward from the tip of the triangle, suggesting that the force of the red wedge has succeeded in breaking the solidity of the white structure. The abstract metaphor was intended to signify the victory of the Red Army over the White, counter-Revolutionary forces." The monument initially was erected as a symbol of victory over White general Pyotr Krasnov, an important early triumph of the Red Army. Versari argues that Lissitzky "adopted an almost identical language" for his Beat the Whites with the Red Wedge, though he never mentioned it.

Lissitzky later used similar idea, a wedge in a circle, for a cover of Yiddish magazine Apikojres ('Atheist'), a periodical published by the League of Militant Atheists. As Artur Kamczycki writes, "Apikojres is a heretic – a Jew who does not believe in revelation and negates traditional religion and will therefore not have a share in the world to come and is bound for eternal damnation. In Yiddish, this word is often used to describe someone who has opinions that contradict the orthodox doctrine. Lissitzky suggests here that a revolution requires sacrifice and transformations in the name of the new, better world." He also noted that Lissitzky believed in the forces of Revolution and combined it with a messianic elements of Judaism, writing:

The educated were expecting the 'new era' to arrive in the shape of a Messiah ... mounted on a white horse. But ... it came in the shape of Russian Ivan ...in tattered and dirty clothes, barefoot ... only the youngest generation recognized this [...].

== Modern use ==
=== Visual arts ===
- The Slabinja Monument to the fallen fighters and victims of WWII fascism from Slabinja, Croatia, seems to be directly inspired by this poster.
- The poster was drawn as hanging on a wall in a 1995 poster created by Gabor Baksay.
- The Russian artist Sergei Bugaev produced an "Anti-Lissitzky" series between 1991 and 1995 which included several derivative works based on "Beat the Whites with the Red Wedge".
- In September 2021, a modified version of this painting was used in Novosibirsk to promote vaccination against the COVID-19.

=== Music ===
- The logo and the name was used by a socialist music and arts organisation in the UK, Red Wedge, which campaigned against the Thatcher government in the lead up to the 1987 general election.
- Franz Ferdinand used the image as inspiration for the cover of their single "This Fire".
- English doom metal band Witchfinder General employ the red wedge motif in the artwork accompanying their 1982 EP Soviet Invasion, and The Wake used the artwork for their twelve-inch single "Something Outside" in 1983.
- A similar simplified version (rotated 1/4 turn clockwise) was used by the German post-punk band Mekanik Destruktiw Komandoh (MDK) (Note: Named after Mekanïk Destruktïẁ Kommandöh, also abbreviated as MDK, the third studio album by French band Magma, released on 6 May 1973.) for their 1983 12" single "Berlin", released on the sixth international label.
- The Soviet post-punk band Kino used the artwork as indirect inspiration for the album cover of their fifth studio album, Gruppa krovi

=== Fiction and games ===
- Lissitzky's Revenge is a game based on Lissitzky's propaganda posters from 1919. It was developed in 2015 and uses paper-cuts as a medium. In the game "you play as the red wedge and must recreate its violent assault on the white circle to complete each level".
- In the science-fiction TV series Farscape, the Peacekeeper faction uses a simplified version of the poster as their logo.
- Belarusian football team FC Vitebsk released a kit featuring the image in 2020.

=== News and non-fiction ===
- Searchlight (magazine) use the red wedge in their current logo.
- The People's history of Australia podcast uses a logo with a red wedge attacking a white map of Australia.

=== Political logos ===
- Several German-speaking Marxist organizations are using a simplified version of the poster for their logo, among them the German/Austrian/Swiss section of the Revolutionary Communist International ("Der Funke") and "Gruppen gegen Kapital und Nation".
- Anti-Fascist Action in the United Kingdom used the symbol in badges in the 80s, the one example showed the pointed red shape smashing a black swastika.
- The Network of Communists (RdC, Italian: Rete dei Comunisti) is a communist political movement network, founded in Bologna, Italy on 13 September 1998.
- NIKA (German: Nationalismus ist keine Alternative, lit. 'Nationalism is not an alternative') was started in Germany in response to the rise of Germany's far-right party, the AfD (German: Alternative für Deutschland, lit. 'Alternative for Germany').
- Organisation of Communist Internationalists (Russian: Организация Коммунистов Интернационалистов)
- Revolutionary Left (Spanish: Izquierda Revolucionaria) in Spain used a red wedge in their first logo.
- Revolutionary Socialism in the 21st Century use a variation of the red wedge in their logo

=== Gallery of modern use ===
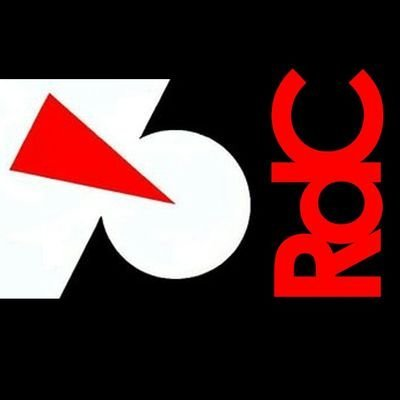
Network of Communists

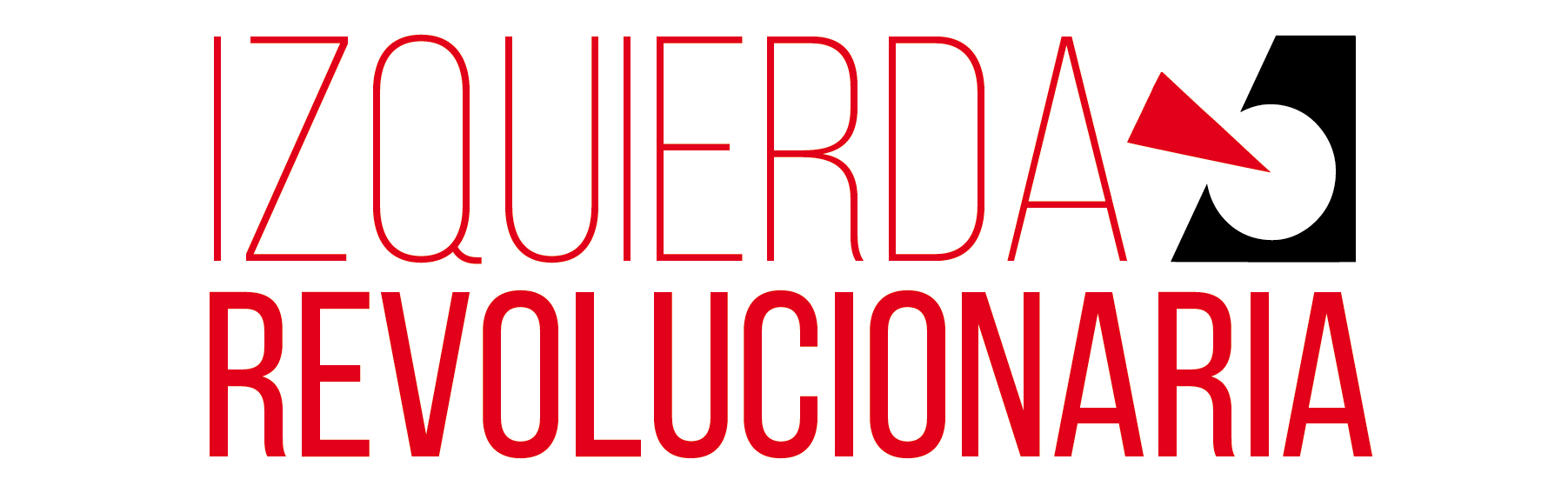
First logo of Revolutionary Left, Spain (Izquierda Revolucionaria)

Organisation of Communist Internationalists
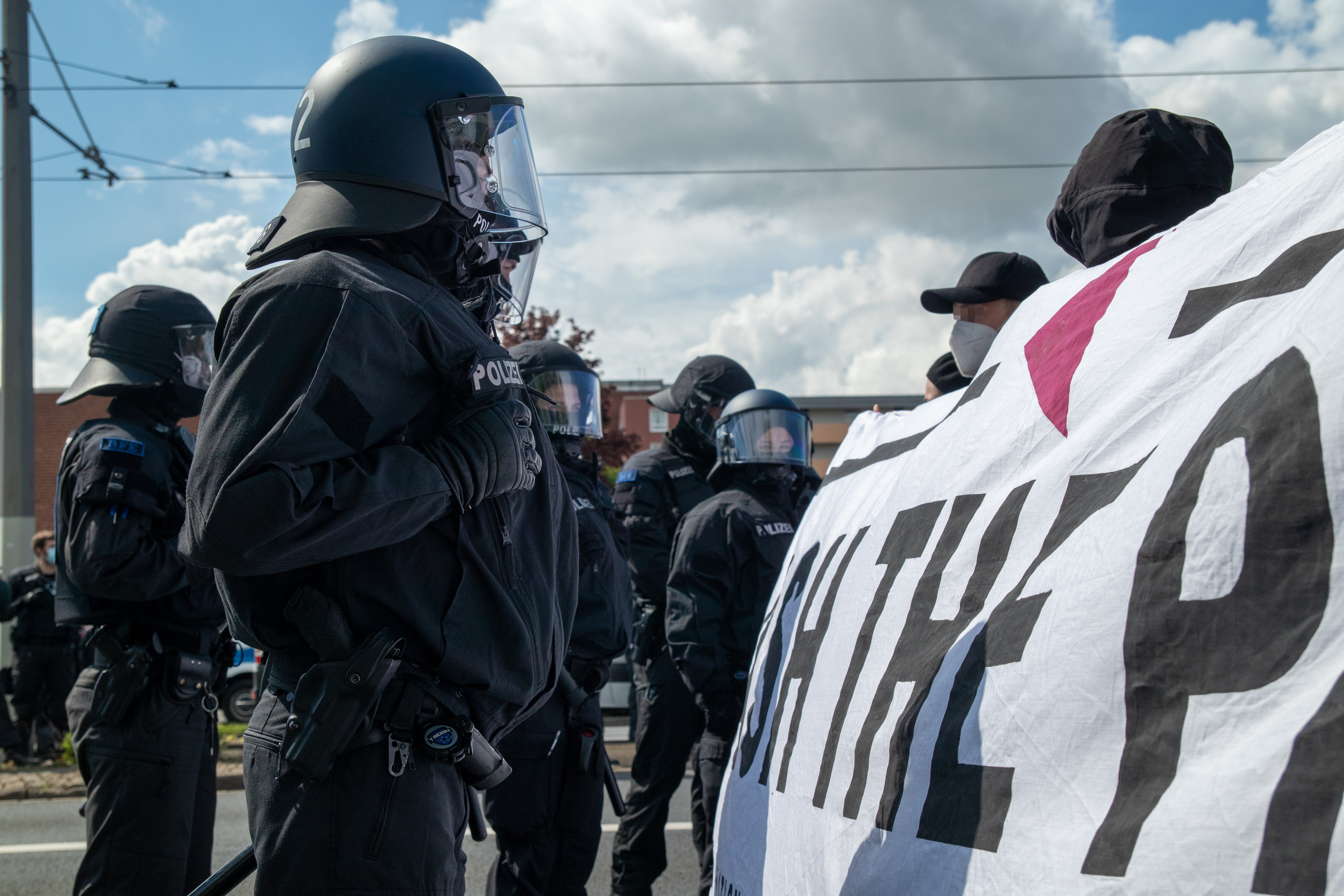
Protest against Alternative for Germany (AfD), Braunschweig, Lower Saxony in 2021. The same protest. NIKA used a similar banner in 2017 that said "crash the party".

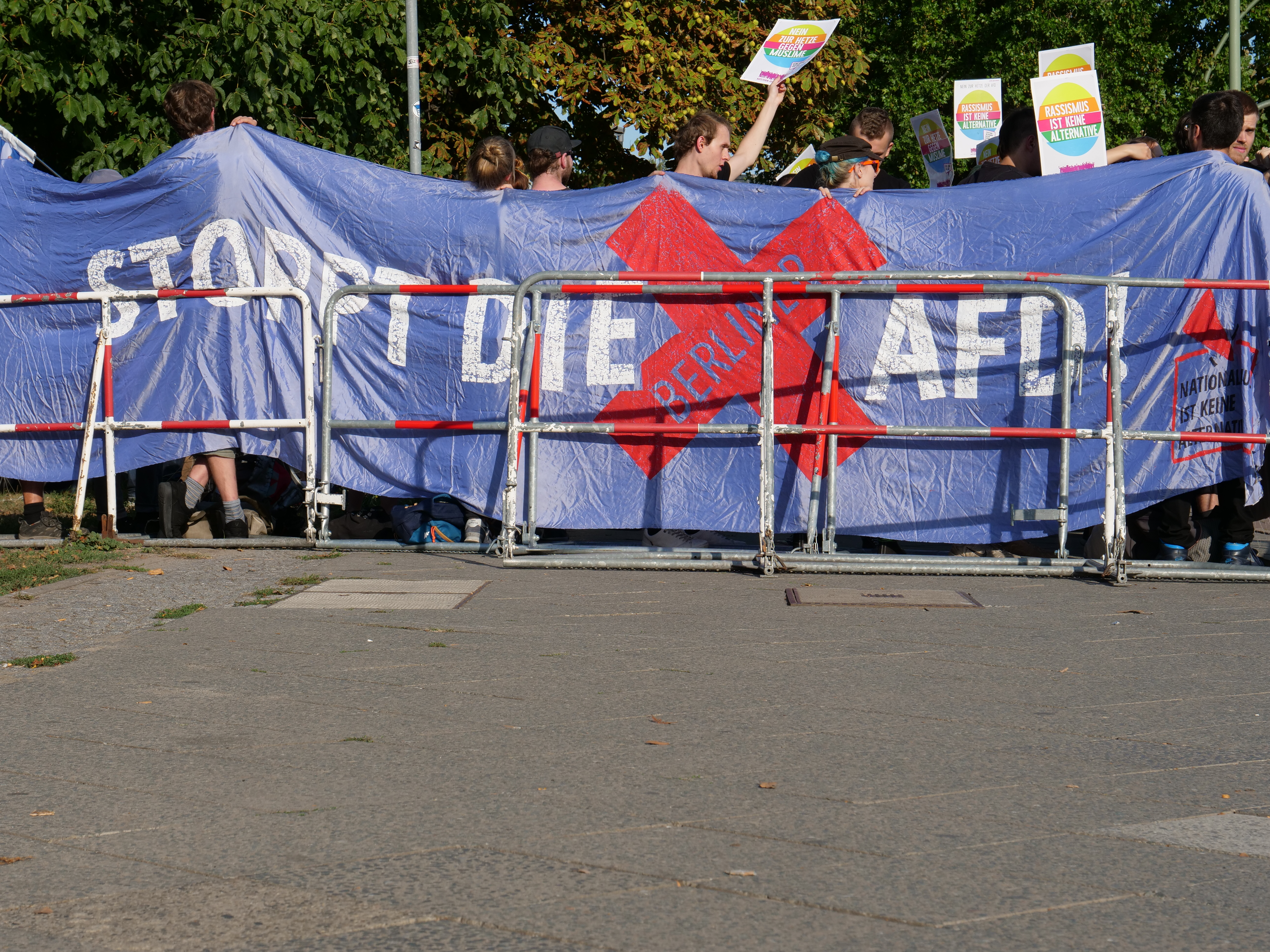
NIKA logo on a banner (lower right corner) in Spandau in 2018, German: Stoppt die Berliner AfD, lit. 'Stop the AfD Berlin'. (Note: Protest against the party conference of the Berlin regional association of the AfD in 2018. See also: Media related to Protest against an AfD meeting in the Zitadelle Spandau on 04-09-2018 at Wikimedia Commons)

== Sources ==
- Birnholz, Alan Curtis (1974). El Lissitzky (PhD thesis). Yale University. ProQuest 302668778.
- Forgács, Éva (2022). Malevich and interwar modernism : Russian art and the international of the square. London: Bloomsbury Visual Arts. ISBN 978-1-350-20417-1.
- Kamczycki, Artur (2013). "El Lissitzky, his Beat the Whites with the Red Wedge and their Jewish Inspirations". In Flamm, Christoph; Keazor, Henry; Marti, Roland (eds.). Russian Emigre Culture: Conservatism or Evolution?. Cambridge Scholars Publishing. ISBN 978-1-4438-5152-7.
- Silver, Steve (16 August 2024). "Berlin and the red triangle". Searchlight (magazine).
- Lissitzky-Küppers, Sophie (1980). El Lissitzky. Life, Letters, Texts. Thames and Hudson. ISBN 978-0-500-23090-9.
- Versari, Maria Elena (2015). "Avant-garde Iconographies of Combat: From the "Futurist Synthesis of War" to "Beat the Whites with the Red Wedge"". Annali d'Italianistica. 33: 187–204. ISSN 0741-7527. JSTOR 43894801.
