= Church of Saint Parascheva, Slabinja =

Serbian Orthodox church in Croatia

Church of Saint Parascheva
- Храм Преподобне мати Параскеве
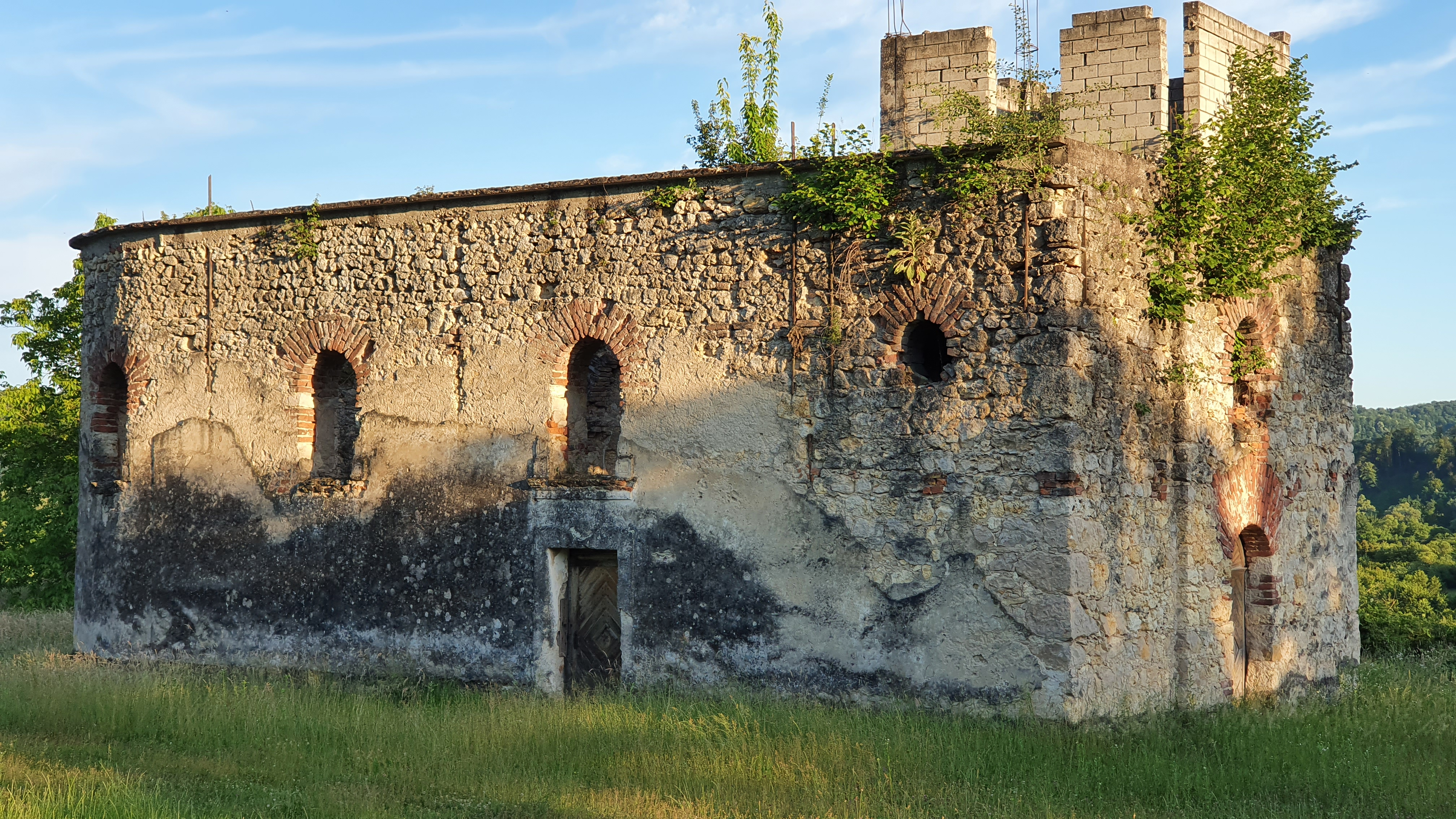
- Ruins of the Church in 2020

- Shown within Banovina Church of Saint Parascheva (Croatia)
- 45°12′38″N 16°40′2″E
- Location: Slabinja, Sisak-Moslavina County
- Country: Croatia
- Denomination: Serbian Orthodox
- Tradition: Eastern Orthodox Church

History
- Status: Church
- Dedication: Parascheva of the Balkans

Architecture
- Functional status: Abandoned
- Architect: R. Battigelli
- Style: Baroque, Eastern Orthodox
- Years built: 1828; 198 years ago
- Demolished: 1944; 82 years ago

Administration
- Diocese: Eparchy of Gornji Karlovac
- Parish: Kostajnica and Dubica

Church of Saint Parascheva (Serbian Cyrillic: Храм Преподобне мати Параскеве) is a Serbian Orthodox church located in Slabinja, Sisak-Moslavina County, in central Croatia. It was dedicated to Saint Parascheva of the Balkans. The Church was built in 1828 and demolished during World War II. Only the perimeter walls are preserved.

The Church is located in the center of village Slabinja, on the south side of the D47 road, towards the river Una.

It is under the jurisdiction of the Eparchy of Gornji Karlovac.

== Patron saint ==
Saint Paraskeva was an ascetic female saint of the 10th century.

== History ==
The Church was built in 1828 based on the R. Battigelli project from 1819. It was built in baroque building style.

In 1944, during World War II, it was demolished by the Ustashe damaging roof structure, vault, interior and church inventory. After the War, ruins remained standing. In 1970, the reconstruction of these valuable buildings began, but the roof, unfortunately, was never set up.

On 4 June 2017, Bishop of Upper Karlovac Gerasim visited the church. Also, the Bishop visited the church on 16 June 2019.

== Gallery ==
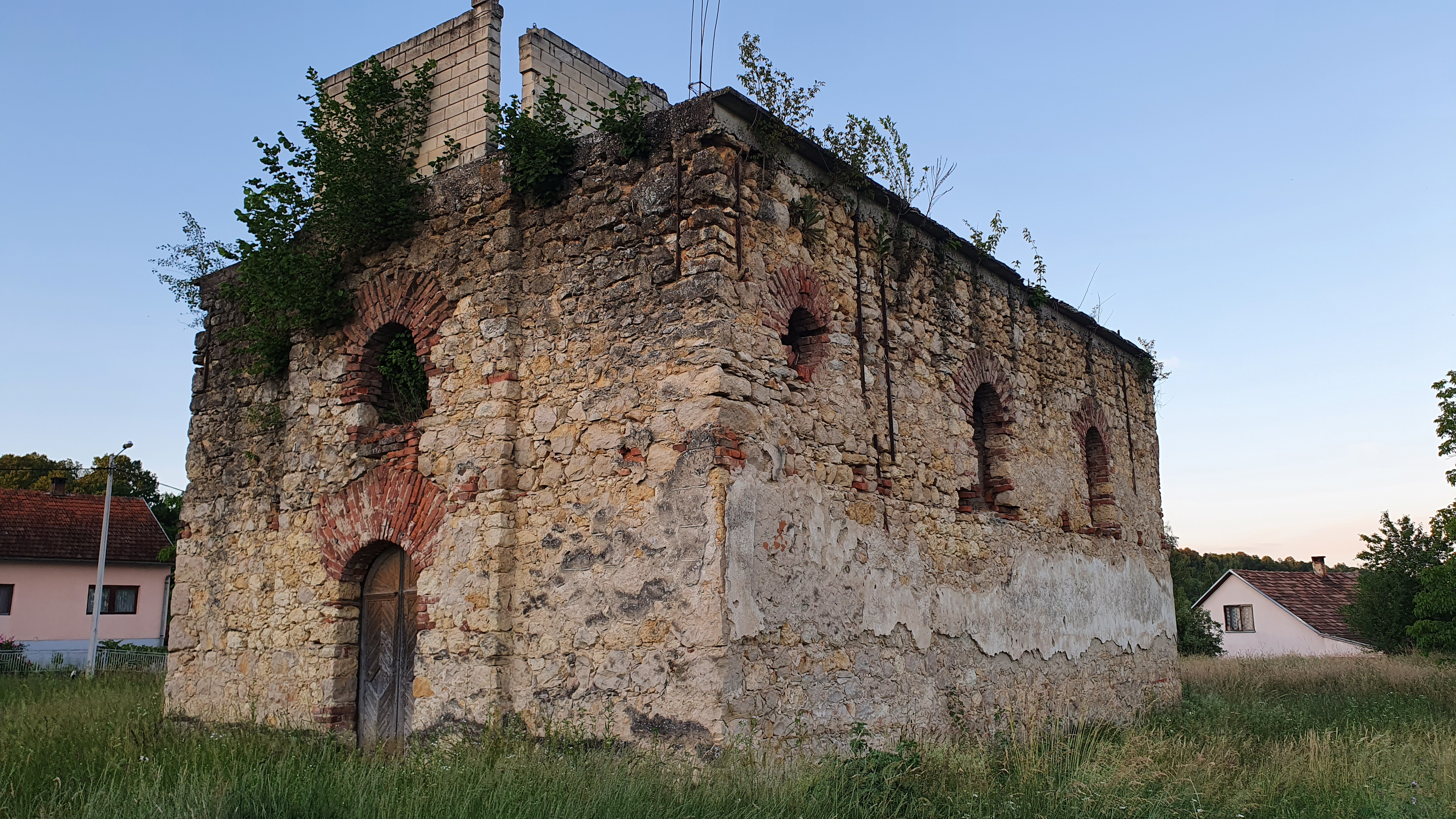
The southwest side of the ruined Church in 2020

== See also ==
- Church of the Holy Venerable Mother Parascheva
- German Opačić
- List of Serbian Orthodox churches in Croatia
