= Slabinja Monument =

War memorial sculpture in Croatia

Monument to the Fallen Fighters and Victims of Fascism from Slabinja
- Spomenik svim borcima i žrtvama fašističkog terora sela Slabinja
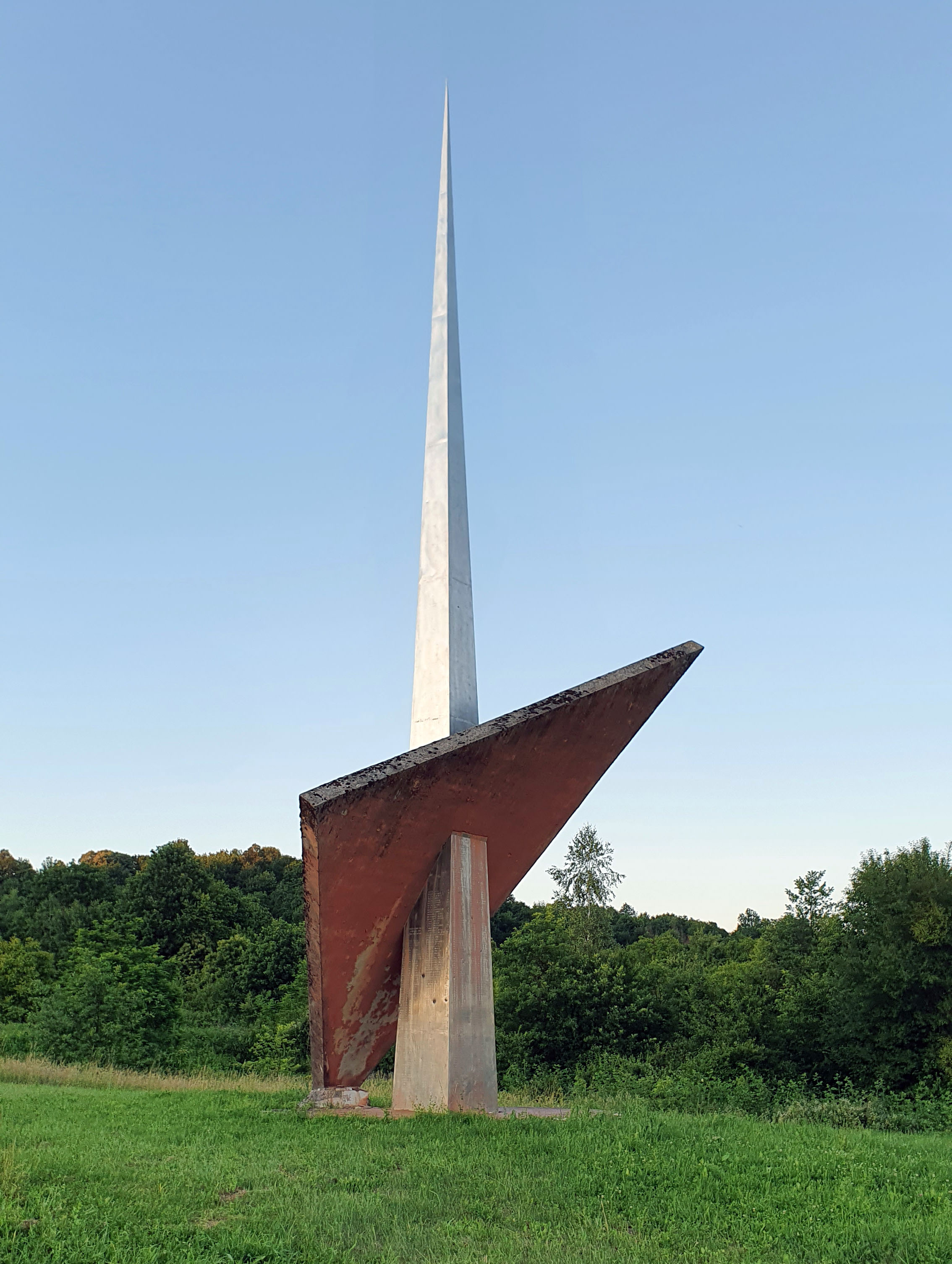
- The Monument in 2020
- Location: Slabinja, Sisak-Moslavina County; Croatia
- Coordinates: 45°12′36″N 16°40′09″E
- Designer: Stanislav Mišić
- Type: War memorial sculpture
- Material: Poured concrete, rebar and stainless steel
- Height: 15 m (49 ft 2 1/2 in)
- Completion date: 1981; 44 years ago
- Opening date: 30 May 1981
- Website: spomenikdatabase.org
- Source: Epitaph

Monument to the Fallen Fighters and Victims of Fascism from Slabinja (Croatian: Spomenik svim borcima i žrtvama fašističkog terora sela Slabinja), simply known as the Slabinja Monument, is a war memorial sculpture located in Slabinja, Sisak-Moslavina County, near Hrvatska Kostajnica, Croatia. The site is dedicated to 547 fallen soldiers and civilians of Slabinja who were killed during the World War II in Yugoslavia.

The author of the monument is Stanislav Mišić. The construction of the monument was completed in 1981.

According to a Croatian researcher Sanja Horvatinčić, this monument seems to be directly inspired by the 1919 Russian constructivist poster Beat the Whites with the Red Wedge by El Lissitzky.

== Work on the monument ==
In the late 1970s, many in Slabinja felt it was necessary to build a proper memorial complex to commemorate the people who had died defending the region during World War II. With help from national League of Communists and regional union of fighters (SUBNOR), the local council of Slabinja organized the monument's construction project, choosing Zagreb-based sculptor Stanislav Mišić to create the complex.

The monument was symbolically unveiled to the public on 30 May 1981, on the occasion of the 40th anniversary of the people's uprising against oppression and also was the same month in which the village was finally liberated from Axis forces in 1945. The occasion was celebrated by thousands of the region's inhabitants during a ceremony that included theatrical plays and poetic readings by writer Đorđe Đurić. Speaker of the Parliament of SR Croatia Jure Bilić held a speech during the opening ceremony, while retired Yugoslav Air Force Major General Zdravko Kolar unveiled the monument.

== Monument description ==
The central sculptural element of the monument is a 15 meters tall spire clad in stainless steel, with a large red-painted concrete triangle intersecting the spire at a sharp angle. Arranged around the monument are five engraved stone markers telling the detailed story of Slabinja from 1941 to 1945.

On the central stainless steel spire of the monument are engraved the names and ages of 547 fallen victims (107 soldiers and 441 civilians) of the Axis occupation and aggression. Additionally, in front of the monument, there are five engraved stone markers set into the ground.

== See also ==
- Monument to the uprising of the people of Kordun and Banija
- List of Yugoslav World War II monuments and memorials in Croatia
