= Nikolai Kolli =

Russian architect, Soviet urban planner (1894–1966)

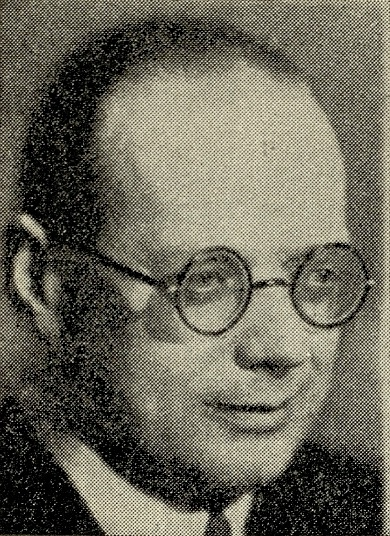
- Kolli in 1939
- Born: Nikolai Dzhemsovich Kolli; 17 August [O.S. 5 August] 1894; Moscow, Russian Empire
- Died: 3 December 1966 (aged 72); Moscow, Soviet Union
- Education: Moscow School of Painting, Sculpture and Architecture; Vkhutemas
- Occupation: Architect

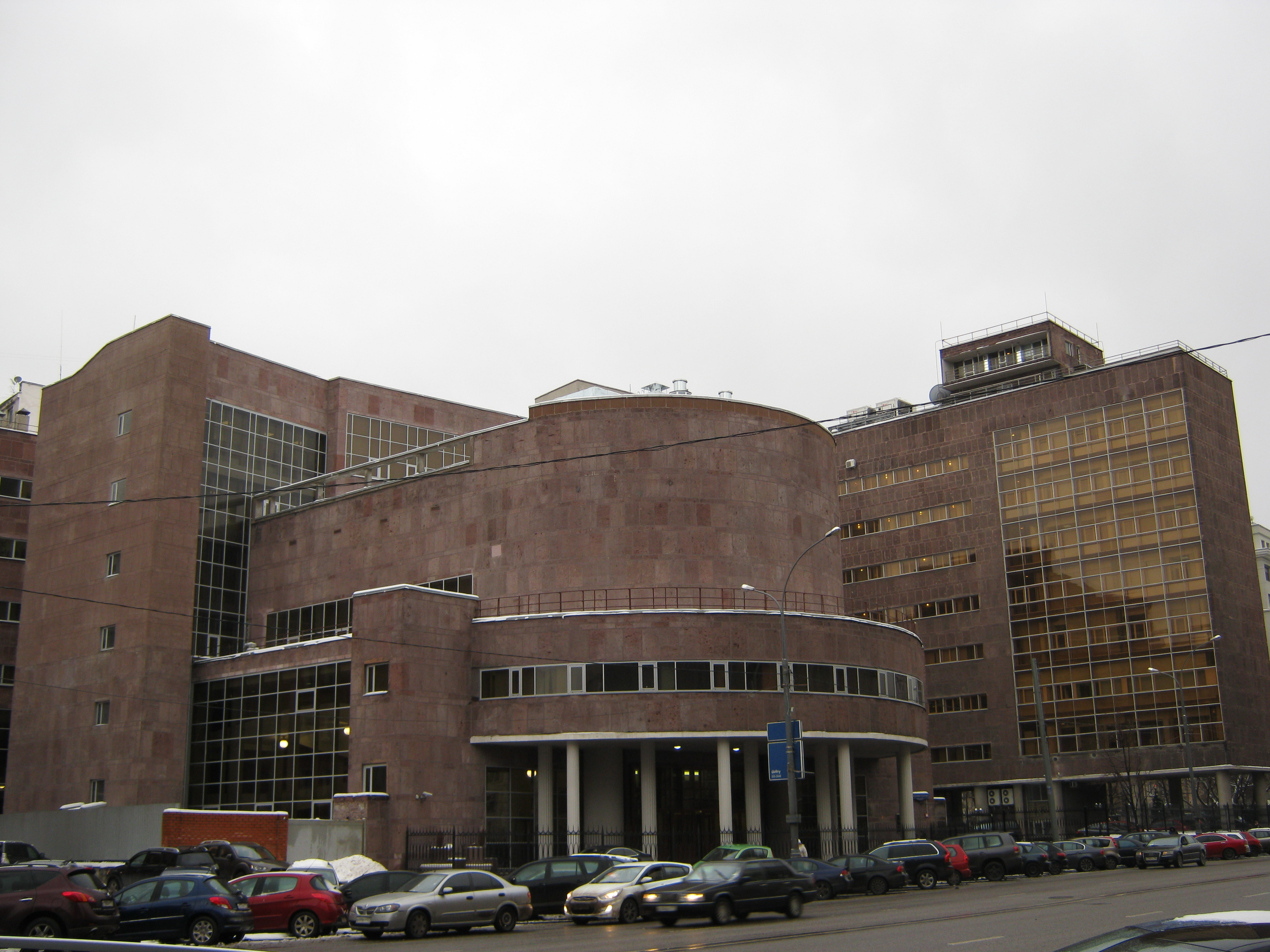
Tsentrosoyuz building (1933), Moscow, collaboration with Le Corbusier

Nikolai Dzhemsovich (Yakovlevich) Kolli (Russian: Николай Джемсович (Яковлевич) Колли; 17 August [O.S. 5 August] 1894 – 3 December 1966) was a Soviet and Russian architectural functionary, and city planner in the Soviet Union. Initially a Modernist—Constructivist architect, he later adopted socialist realism.

== History ==
Kolli (Coley) was born in Moscow in to a family of Scottish origin, and studied at the Imperial Moscow School of Painting, Sculpture and Architecture, and then at the Leninist VKhUTEMAS in Moscow.

He first came to attention with a 1918 proposal for a monument celebrating the victory of the Red Army over Tzarist General Krasnov, in the form of a red wedge cleaving a block of white stone. It became an image that artist El Lissitzky subsequently appropriated in "Beat the Whites with the Red Wedge."

=== Modernism ===
Nikolai Kolli studied under Ivan Zholtovsky as one of his "Twelve Disciples." In the late 1920s became a member of both the Soviet OSA Group (Union of Contemporary Architects), and a delegate to the international CIAM (Congrès International d'Architecture Moderne) architectural group.

From 1928 to 1932 he lived part-time in Paris, assisting Le Corbusier in that architect's only built work in Moscow, the Tsentrosoyuz building (Central Cooperative Alliance offices).

=== Career ===
Kolli taught at the N. E. Bauman Moscow Higher Technical School from 1920 to 1941, and at the Moscow Institute of Architecture from 1931 to 1941.

From 1935 to 1951 he headed the Moscow branch of the Soviet Union of Architects. Nikolai Kolli is buried in the Vvedenskoye Cemetery.

=== Works ===
The works of Nikolai Kolli include:

- All-Russian Agricultural and Cottage-industry Exhibition, Moscow, 1923 — collaborated in the design of a number of structures.
- Dnieper Hydroelectric Station, on the Dnieper River in Zaporizhzhia, 1927-1932 — with Viktor Vesnin and others.
- Tsentrosoyuz building (Central Cooperative Alliance), Moscow, (design 1928 - 1933, built 1933) — collaboration with Le Corbusier.
- Chistye Prudy station of the Moscow Metro, 1935.
- North Pavilion for the Park Kultury station of the Moscow Metro, 1935 — with S.G. Andrievsky.
- Paveletskaya station of the Moscow Metro, 1950 — with I. Kasetl.

== See also ==
- Constructivist architecture
- Modernist architecture in Russia
