= Red Wedge =

British left-wing musical collective of the 1980s

Red Wedge was a collective of musicians formed in the UK in 1985 who attempted to educate youth with the policies of the Labour Party leading up to the 1987 general election in the hope of ousting the Conservative government of Margaret Thatcher.

== History ==
Fronted by Billy Bragg (whose 1985 Jobs for Youth tour had been a prototype of sorts for Red Wedge), Paul Weller and the Communards' lead singer Jimmy Somerville, the Red Wedge held concert parties and appeared in the media, adding their support to the Labour Party campaign.

The group was launched on 21 November 1985, when Bragg, Weller, Strawberry Switchblade and Kirsty MacColl were invited to a reception at the Palace of Westminster hosted by Labour MP Robin Cook. The collective took its name from a 1919 poster by Russian constructivist artist El Lissitzky titled Beat the Whites with the Red Wedge. Despite this echo of the Russian Civil War, Red Wedge was not a communist organisation, nor was it officially an arm of the Labour Party, but it did initially occupy office space at Labour's headquarters. The group's logo, also inspired by the Lissitzky poster, was designed by Neville Brody.

Red Wedge organised a number of major tours. The first, in January and February 1986, featured Bragg, Weller's band the Style Council, the Communards, Junior Giscombe, Lorna Gee and Jerry Dammers, with guest appearances by Madness, the The, Heaven 17, Bananarama, Prefab Sprout, Elvis Costello, Gary Kemp, Tom Robinson, Sade, the Beat, Lloyd Cole, the Blow Monkeys, Joolz and the Smiths.

Red Wedge did not receive universal support from left-wing musicians, and some groups such as the Housemartins, Easterhouse and the Redskins rejected involvement and/or criticised the campaign.

When the general election was called in 1987, Red Wedge organised a comedy tour featuring Lenny Henry, Ben Elton, Robbie Coltrane, Craig Charles, Phill Jupitus and Harry Enfield, and another tour by the main musical participants along with The The, Captain Sensible and the Blow Monkeys. The group also published an election pamphlet, Move On Up, with a foreword by Labour leader Neil Kinnock.

After the 1987 election produced a third consecutive Conservative victory, many of the musical collective drifted away. A few further gigs were arranged and the group's magazine Well Red continued, but funding eventually disappeared and Red Wedge was formally disbanded in 1990.

== See also ==
- Anti-Fascist Action – British anti-fascist organisation
- Beat the Whites with the Red Wedge – Poster by El Lissitzky
- Red triangle (badge) § Red Wedge – Symbol of anti-fascism
