= Federal State Statistics Service =

Russian socioeconomic statistics provider

- Федеральная служба государственной статистики
- Agency emblem

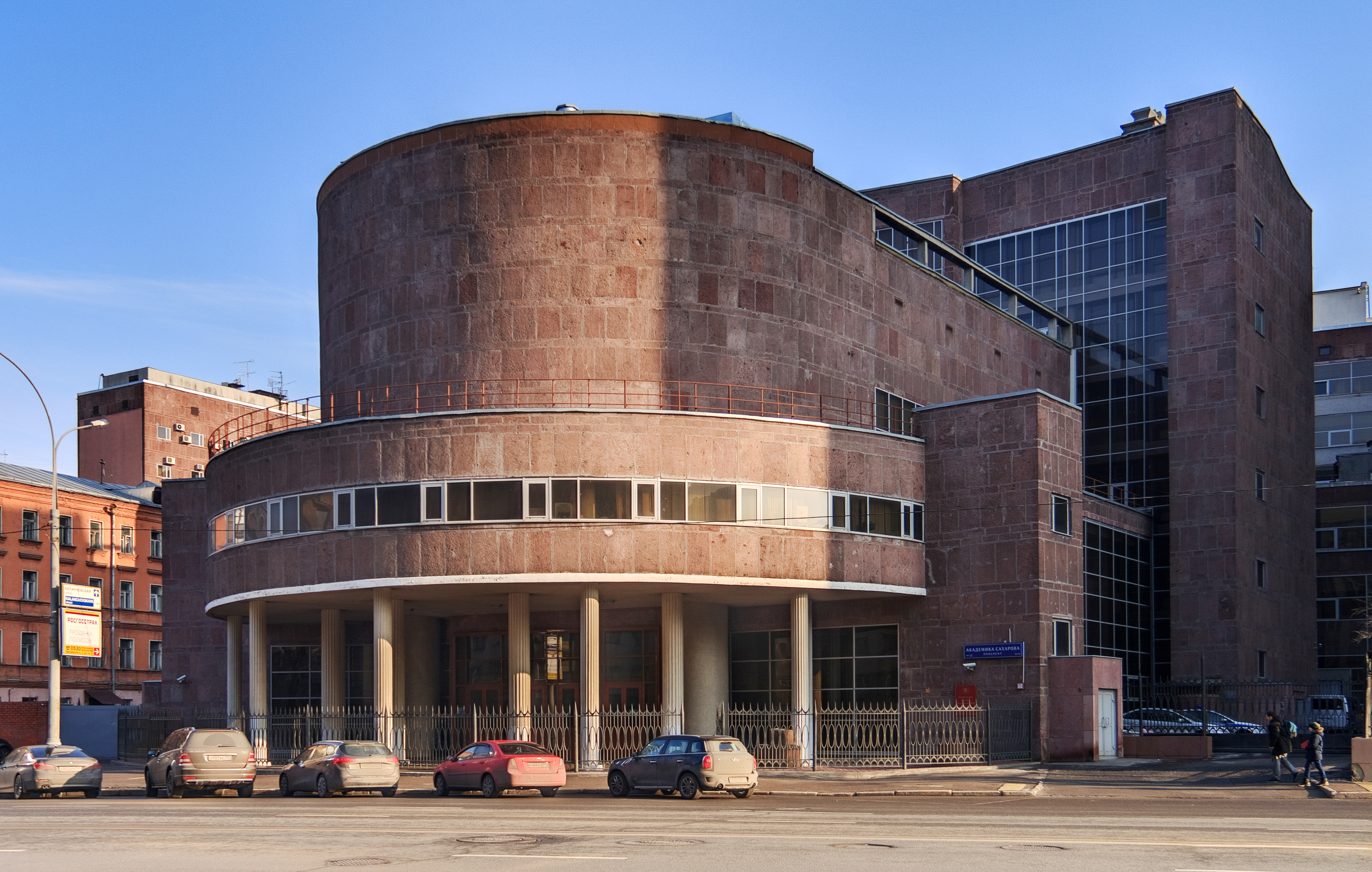
- Agency headquarters in the Tsentrosoyuz building

Agency overview
- Formed: 9 March 2004
- Jurisdiction: Government of Russia
- Headquarters: Tsentrosoyuz building, Myasnitskaya Street 39, Moscow
- Employees: 23,000
- Agency executive: Sergei Galkin
- Parent agency: Ministry of Economic Development
- Website: rosstat.gov.ru

The Federal State Statistics Service (Russian: Федеральная служба государственной статистики, romanized: Federalnaya sluzhba gosudarstvennoy statistiki, abbreviated as Rosstat) (Note: Russian: Росстат) is the governmental statistics agency in Russia.

Since 2017, it is again part of the Ministry of Economic Development, having switched several times in the previous decades between that ministry and being directly controlled by the federal government.

== History ==
=== Soviet era ===
Goskomstat (Russian: Государственный комитет по статистике, romanized: Gosudarstvennyi komitet po statistike, or, in English, the State Committee for Statistics) was the centralised agency dealing with statistics in the Soviet Union. Goskomstat was created in 1987 to replace the Central Statistical Directorate, while maintaining the same basic functions in the collection, analysis, publication and distribution of state statistics, including economic, social and population statistics. This renaming amounted to a formal demotion of the status of the agency.

In addition to overseeing the collection and evaluation of state statistics, Goskomstat (and its predecessors) was responsible for planning and carrying out the population and housing censuses. It carried out seven such censuses, in 1926, 1937, 1939, 1959, 1970, 1979 and 1989.

House No. 39 on Ulitsa Myasnitskaya, the Tsentrosoyuz building, was designed by the Swiss-born architect Le Corbusier and built in 1933.

=== Post-Soviet era ===
The change away from the Soviet system entailed a change of name, to Rosstat. Rosstat is responsible for reporting everything from the Russian census, to grain production, to demographics, to gas production statistics, and transportation statistics.

On 22 August 2012 Rosstat became the corresponding statistical member at the World Trade Organization when Russia joined it on that date. The accession process was launched in 1993, with more intensive negotiations from 2000. The reduction of tariffs associated with Russian membership in the WTO was significant, and its transparency requirements forced change on Rosstat.

On 29 May 2024 Rosstat unilaterally decided to stop publishing statistics on gas production. It blamed the cessation on "the current geopolitical situation" and said the decision was made "to ensure petroleum product market information security". "UAV attacks" by anonymous parties were simultaneously reported.

On 29 August 2024 Rosstat completely stopped publishing petroleum product statistics. Information on monthly production of diesel fuel, fuel oil, liquefied propane and butane, and coke and semi-coke produced from hard coal, and stable gas condensate production were discontinued at this time, because of a unilateral "decision by the Russian government". It was felt that "disclosure of such information could become an occasion for manipulation of the market by its unethical participants."

On 1 November 2026, cyberattack from Belarus Cyber Partisans and Silent Crow groups leaked statistics of the casualties in the Russo-Ukrainian War, with over 412,576 Russian soldiers killed in action in the official figures.

== See also ==
- List of national and international statistical services
