= The Tsentrosoyuz Building =

Building of Myasnitskaya Street, Russia

Coordinates: 55°46′3.4″N 37°38′28.05″E

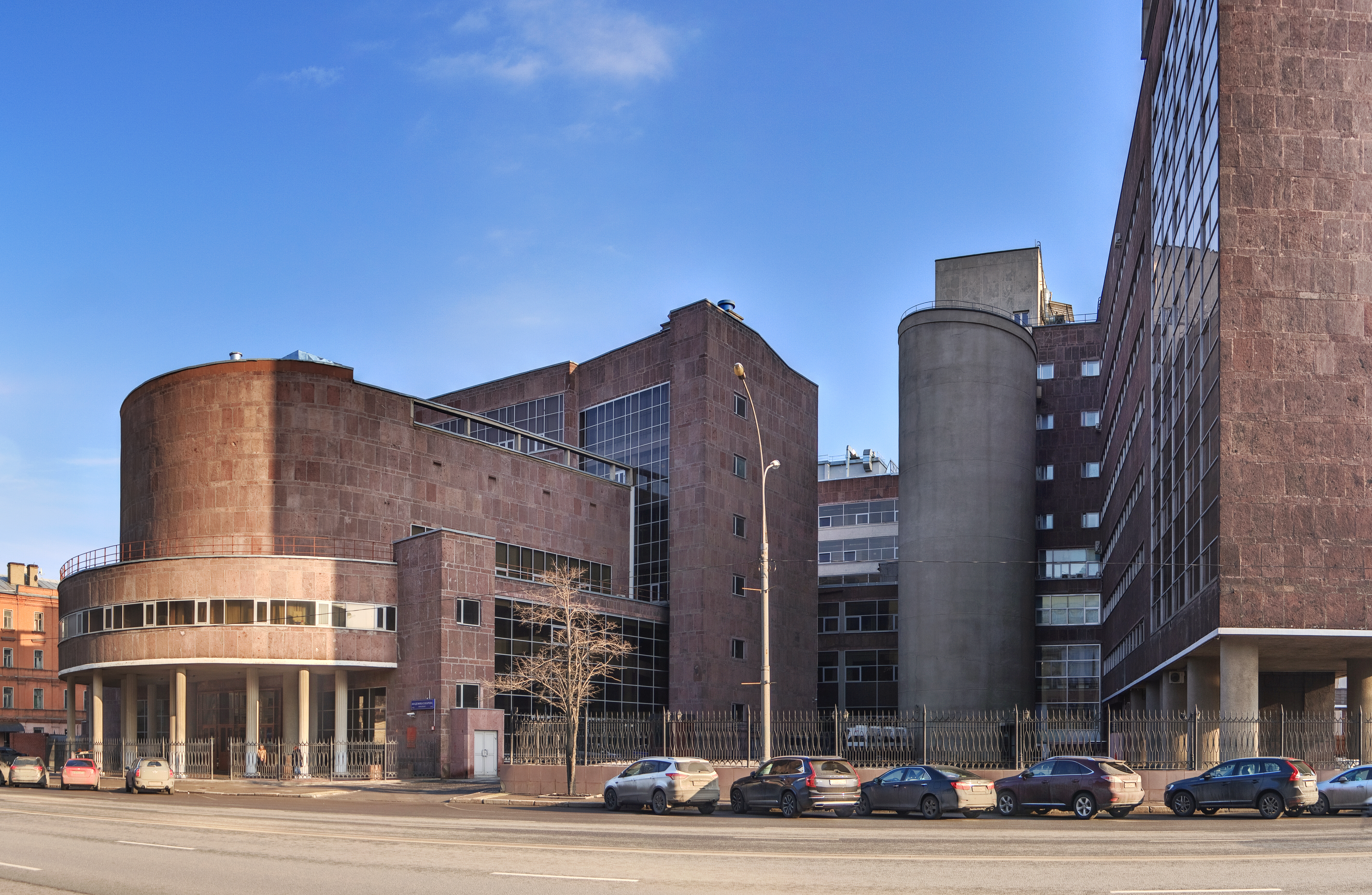
Tsentrosoyuz building

The Tsentrosoyuz Building or Centrosoyuz Building (Russian: Центросоюз) is a government structure in Moscow, Russia, constructed in 1933 by Le Corbusier and Nikolai Kolli. Centrosoyuz refers to a Soviet bureaucracy, the Central Union of Consumer Cooperatives. The building included office space for 3,500 personnel, as well as a restaurant, lecture halls, a theater, and other facilities. The address of the building is 39 Myasnitskaya Street, and the eastern side of the building faces Myasnitskaya Street. The western side, which was supposed to be the main entrance, faces Academician Sakharov Avenue. Currently it is the home of Rosstat (Russian: Росстат), Russian Federal State Statistics Service and Federal Financial Monitoring Service (Russian financial intelligence unit).

== Architecture ==
There were three architectural competitions for the project beginning in 1928. Le Corbusier won all three. Upon his victory in the third competition in 1928 he wrote: "I shall bring to this task all that I have learned in architecture. It is with great joy that I shall contribute what knowledge I possess to a nation that is being organized in accordance with its new spirit."

The project applied on larger scale Le Corbusier's architectural principles: pilotis, curtain-wall façade, free floor plan, ribbon windows and flat roof. It was to accommodate 3500 people and Le Corbusier considered the question of circulation as of main importance. The system of pilotis for the accommodation of people and cars was proposed and proved to be very effective by allowing multiple access points to the building. The ramps were proposed by the architect for the interior circulation between the floors, detail that links back to his Villa Savoye. Le Corbusier said: "We have approached the problem as urban planners, that is, we have considered that corridors and stairs are, so to speak, enclosed streets. In consequence, these streets are 3.25 meters wide, and are always well lit. Moreover, we have replaced tiring flights of stairs with gently sloping (14%) ramps that allow for free and easy circulation."

In 1929, the complete set of construction plans for the Tsentrosoyuz building was sent to Moscow and work was started. However, delays were encountered due to the materials shortages caused by Joseph Stalin's first five-year plan. The building is made of reinforced concrete, with sixteen-inch-thick blocks of red tuff stone from the Caucasus serving as insulation.

The glass façade was intended to include an innovative heating and ventilation system. The respiration exacte (mechanical ventilation system) and the murs neutralisants (neutral walls, heating/cooling pipes between the layers of glass), both Le Corbusier's latest inventions, as well as Gustave Lyon's aeration ponctuelle method were considered for heating and refrigeration of the glass prisms and the interior. These innovations were rejected, in part due to the materials shortage, and in part due to the experimental character of the proposed technologies (including a critique of the systems by the experts from the American Blower Corporation as unpractical and expensive). Instead, a system of radiators was introduced for heating, and roller blinds and translucent glass meant to protect the building from heat (which proved ineffective in the hot summer months).

The building was criticized by fellow Swiss architect Hannes Meyer as being "an orgy of glass and concrete". Russian constructivist Alexander Vesnin however called it "the best building to arise in Moscow for over a century".

== Photos ==
Tsentrosoyuz in the 1950s

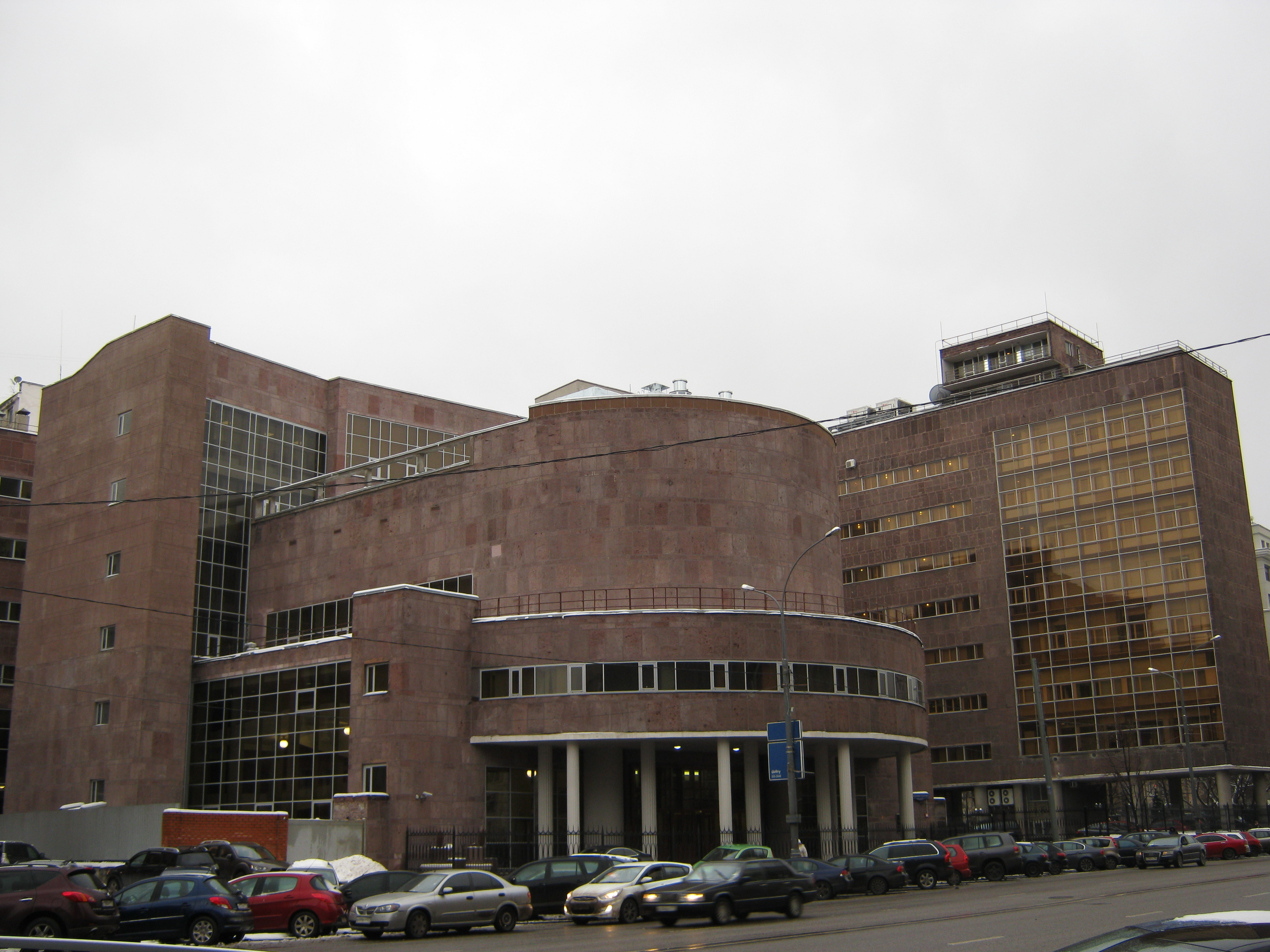
2012
