= Slabinja =

Village in Sisak-Moslavina County, Croatia

- Village
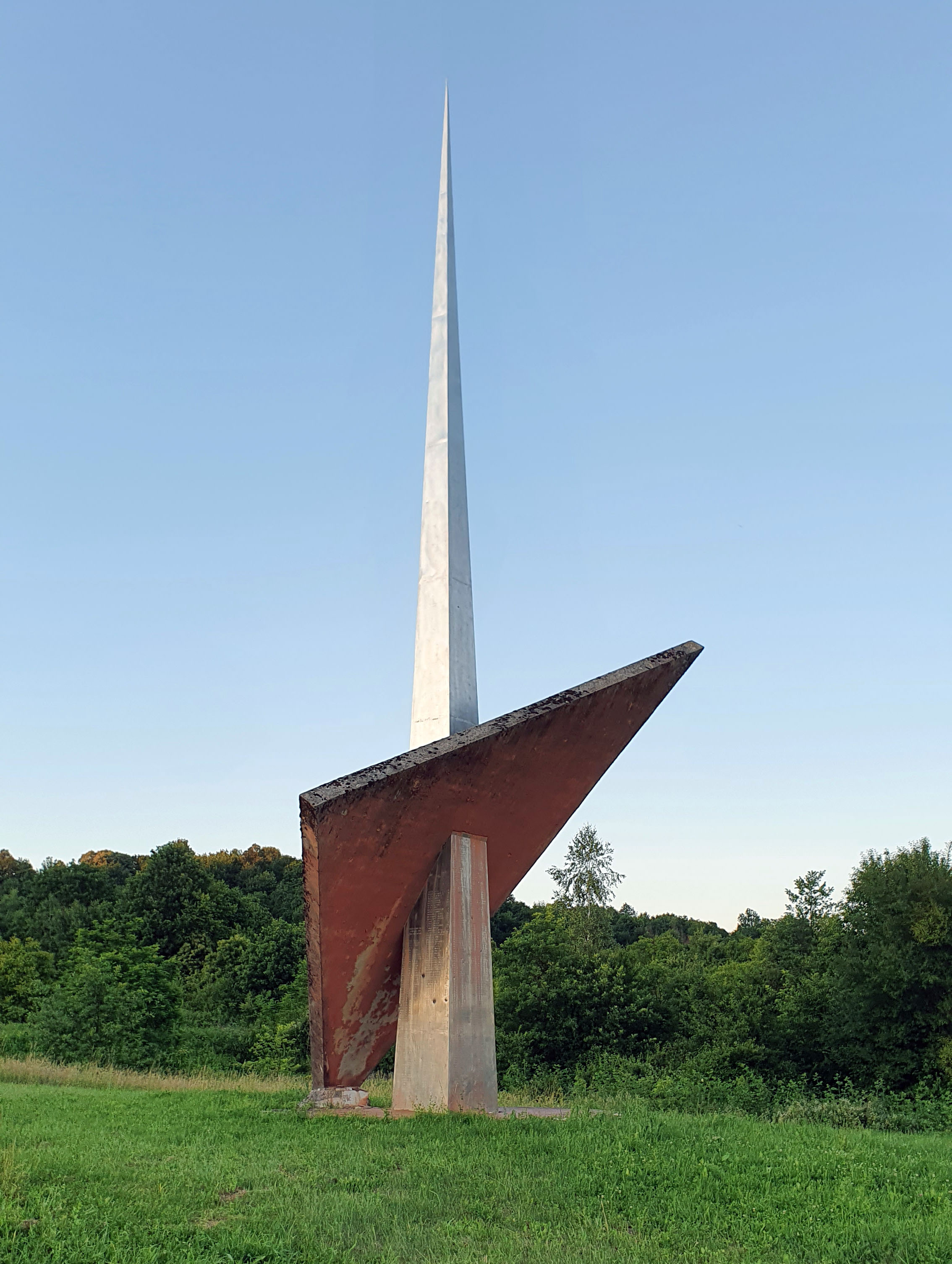
- The Slabinja Monument

- Location of Slabinja in Croatia Slabinja (Europe)
- Coordinates: 45°12′17″N 16°41′55″E
- Country: Croatia
- Region: Banovina / Banija
- County: Sisak-Moslavina
- Municipality: Hrvatska Dubica
- Land Charter: 1698

Area
  - Total: 16.4 km^{2} (6.3 sq mi)
- Elevation: 113 m (371 ft)
- Highest elevation: 192 m (630 ft)

Population (2021)
  - Total: 238
  - Density: 14.5/km^{2} (37.6/sq mi)
- Demonym(s): Slabinjka (female); Slabinjac (male)
- Time zone: UTC+1 (CET)
  - Summer (DST): UTC+2 (CEST)
- Postal code: HR-44 450
- Area code: +385 44
- Vehicle registration: SK

Slabinja (Croatian pronunciation: [slābiɲa]; Hungarian: Szlabina; Serbian Cyrillic: Слабиња) is a village in the Sisak-Moslavina County in the central part of Croatia. It is in the Una Valley near the border with Bosnia and Herzegovina, 12.6 kilometres (7.8 mi) southeast of the town of Hrvatska Kostajnica, 9.7 kilometres (6 mi) northwest of the village of Hrvatska Dubica, and 106 kilometres (66 mi) southeast of Croatian capital Zagreb, at the south fringe of the Banovina region. Slabinja is a dormitory village with a resident population of just over 250 people.

== History ==
Historical affiliations

Kingdom of Hungary 1334–1526
→ Croatia in union with the Kingdom
Habsburg monarchy 1526–1538
→ (Kingdom of Croatia (Habsburg)) Kingdom of Croatia
Ottoman Empire 1538–1685
→ Bosnia Eyalet
Habsburg Monarchy 1685–1809
→ Croatian Military Frontier
First French Empire 1809–1814
→ Illyrian Provinces
Austrian Empire 1814–1867
→ Croatian Military Frontier
Austria-Hungary 1867–1918
→ Kingdom of Croatia-Slavonia
State of Slovenes, Croats and Serbs 1918
Kingdom of Yugoslavia 1918–1941
→ Banovina of Croatia 1939–1941
(Independent State of Croatia) IS Croatia 1941–1945 (Nazi puppet state)
SFR Yugoslavia 1945–1991
→ SR Croatia
Croatia 1991–present
→ Serbian Krajina 1991–1995 (proto-state)

The Roman Empire conquered this area in the 1st century AD. Construction of roads has started at that time. There are two main roads in the Illyricum Province; one road led from Salona to Siscia and the other from Siscia to Sirmium. The latter course went near today's Slabinja, which is proven by the Roman milestone found near the village. A total of five such milestones were in the area of the village. During the Roman Empire, the area of today's Slabinja was at the southern fringe of the province Pannonia, and Pannonia Superior and Pannonia Savia subsequently.

The first settlers in this area came in the 7th century. In the 10th century, the area became a part of the newly formed the Kingdom of Croatia. Succession crisis to the Croatian throne has weakened the Kingdom which in the end led to the unification with Kingdom of Hungary under the Pacta conventa in 1102. Before that, the Hungarian King's Army led by King Coloman defeated Petar Snačić, the last Croatian king, in the Battle of Gvozd Mountain. In the Middle Ages, the area of the village belonged to the Dubica cemetery, while the first known holders of the land were the Babonić family. In 1334, Slabinja first appears in a written source when its church is mentioned in a list of parishes of the Roman Catholic Diocese of Zagreb.

This area was attacked by the Ottomans in 1461 for the first time. In October 1483, near the Dubica, the army of Knyaz Bernardin Frankopan defeated the regional Ottoman forces in the Battle of Una. In 1513, the Ottomans attacked the border zone again and occupied Dubica. On 16 August, Croatian Army led by Ban Petar Berislavić clashed with the Ottoman army forces between the Sava and Una rivers and won a great victory over them in the Battle of Dubica. Estimates of Ottoman casualties range from over 2,000 to 7,000 killed, drowned while fleeing, and imprisoned, together with a large number of freed Christian captives. Among them, there were four army commanders killed and one captured. After the battle, Berislavić was named as Count of Dubica and Prior of Vrana by King of Hungary and Croatia Vladislaus II. In 1538, during the Third Ottoman Venetian War, Slabinja had fallen under the Ottoman rule and remains under their control until 1685. At the time of Turkish rule, part of the Sanjak of Banja Luka, within Bosnia Eyalet.

=== 17th century ===
Under the anti-Ottoman liberation struggle, in 1685, Croatian Ban Nikola III Erdődy issued a command to curtail the Ottoman army to the Una Valley. The Imperial Army liberated the area. The established conditions of power were confirmed by the 1699 Treaty of Karlowitz, thus the border was formally drawn to the Una Valley. The settlement of the Serbs in the area began in 1687. Ban Erdödy asked Bishop Martin Borković of Zagreb to settle Serbs at the Bishop's estates near Bović and Kirin.

In the southern part of Banovina, near Blinja, the Keglevich family had significant land. Because of this, they stood in constant clash with the Bosnian–Ottoman army. To strengthen the defense forces, the Keglevichs settled a large number of Orthodox Serb families southern from Petrinja and Sunja. In 1693, Count Ferenc Erdődy of Petrinya appointed Knyaz Petar Draškovich as the governor of "Vlachs" (a term used for a community of mostly Orthodox refugees, mainly Serbs (Note: The term "Vlachs" was also used for Slavs who shared lifestyle (as shepherds) with Romance peoples (Vlachs); it was used for the Serbs who settled the Military Frontier. See: Statuta Valachorum)) in Slabinja and other surrounding inhabited places. For protection from the Ottoman army, the watchtowers were built along the Una River, several of which were located in Slabinja, one stood near the village's church.

On September 18, 1698, people of Slabinja got a land charter (Croatian: Slabinjska povelja). They were granted land as a reward for the service in the Great Turkish War and a defense of the Croatian Military Frontier. The Charter guaranteed them a legal, undisturbed and protected land management in Slabinja. Also, with this act Count Péter Keglevich, Commander-in-chief of the Kostajnica confirmed their earlier taxation and tenancy rights. At the time, Knyaz Pavle Dragošević was administrating the County. He was appointed on March 1, 1693. The area was known as the Slabinja County (Croatian: Slabinjska knežija) at the time. The County had three stockades (Upper, Middle, and Lower) and about a hundred people capable of military service according to the census on December 13, 1696.

=== 18th and 19th century ===
In 1703, Emperor Leopold I placed the entire area between Una and Kupa under the military command of the Ban of Croatia, creating the Ban's Borderland (Croatian: Banska Krajina). In the 18th century, there were two major Austro-Turkish wars, the 1716–1718 War and the 1735–1739 War. In the first war, the Imperial Army liberated Northern Bosnia and Serbia, but in the second they lost these areas. In 1749, the Military Frontier was once again reorganized and modeled after the Imperial Army and its regular regiments, so the Ban's Borderland was divided into two regiments: Glina and Kostajnica.

In 1774, the village was listed as "Dorf Szlabina" (Dorf, Eng. a village) on the map of the First Military Survey. On the map, it could be found the village's old church, which was then dedicated to Saint Elijah. Today's church was built in 1828. Briefly, Slabinja was under French rule between 1809 and 1814 in the Illyrian Provinces.

According to the 1857 census, the village had 609 inhabitants. After the demilitarization of the Military Frontier, Slabinja was a part of the Kostajnica District in the Zagreb County of the Kingdom of Croatia-Slavonia, within the Austro-Hungarian Empire.

=== 20th and 21st century ===
In 1918, after the end of World War I, Slabinja became part of the newly formed State of Slovenes, Croats, and Serbs which joined into Kingdom of Serbs, Croats and Slovenes. From 1929 to 1939, Slabinja was part of the Sava Banovina and from 1939 to 1941 of the Banovina of Croatia within the Kingdom of Yugoslavia.

As a Serb-populated village, it experienced a particularly difficult time during World War II.

During SFR Yugoslavia (1945–1991) Slabinja was part of large municipality Kostajnica, SR Croatia. Slabinja got electricity in 1963 and the road is asphalted in 1971.

During the Croatian War (1991–1995), the village was part of the unrecognized republic of Srpska Krajina. Slabinja was put back in Croatian Government authority following military victories by the Croatian Army in the 1995 Operation Storm. Since 1995, Slabinja has been an administrative part of the Hrvatska Dubica Municipality, within the Sisak-Moslavina County.

In September 2016, Slabinja got a kids playground funded by Croatia Without Mines Foundation and the Dubica municipality.

== Geography ==
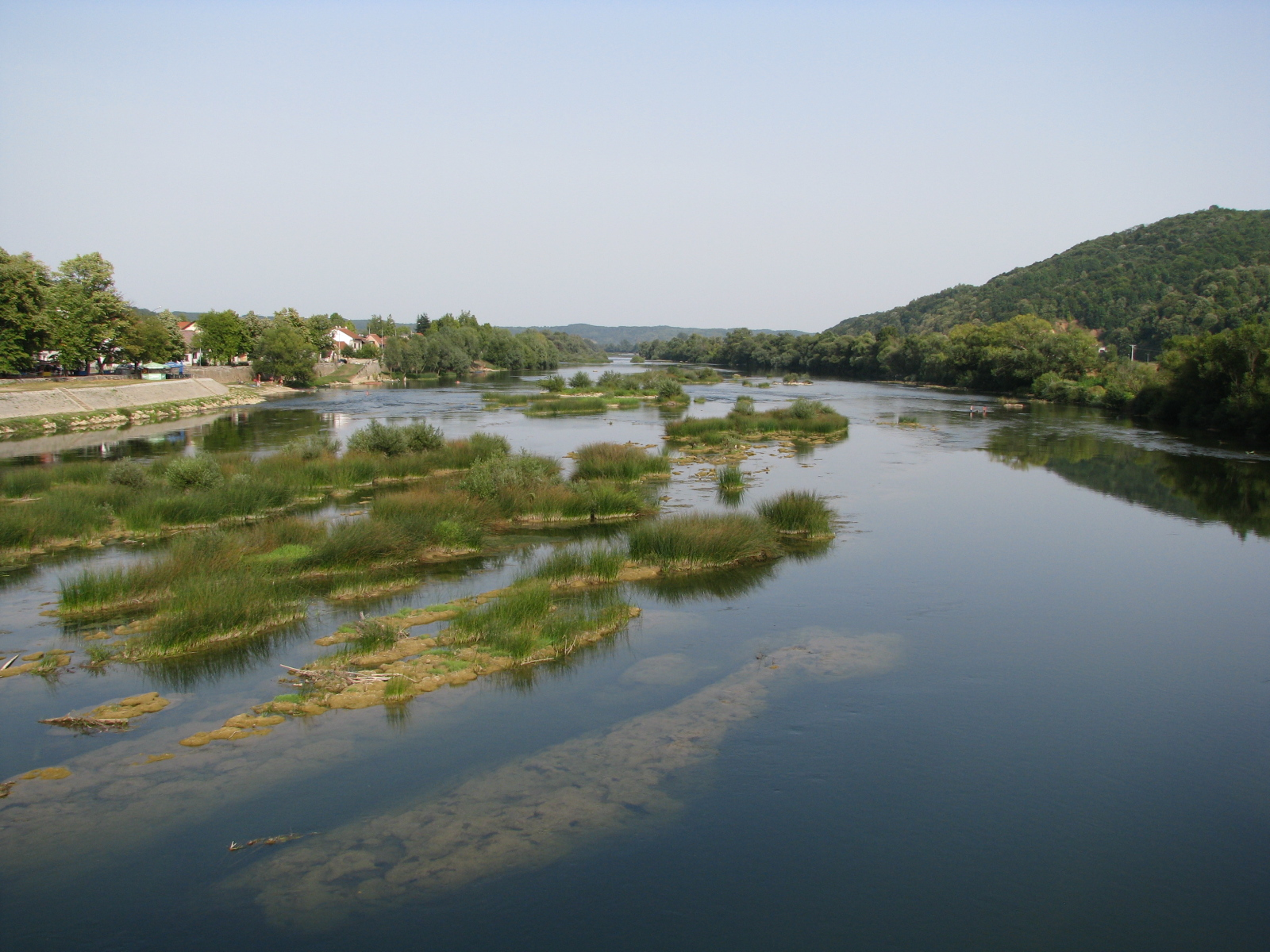
View of the Una River flowing through the area

At 45°12′17″N 16°41′55″E (45.204722, 16.698611) Slabinja is in the Petrinja-Dubica Downs microregion in Croatia proper, at the south fringe of the Banovina region. The community is 113 metres (371 ft) above sea level, 12.6 kilometres (7.8 mi) southeast of Hrvatska Kostajnica, 9.7 kilometres (6 mi) northwest of Hrvatska Dubica, and 53 kilometres (33 mi) south-southeast of the County seat Sisak. The chief river is the Una, which has its source at the Stražbenica mountain in Croatian region Lika. It flows south and parallel to Slabinja towards Dubica, before uniting its waters with those of the Sava.

The topography of Slabinja is irregular. The highest point is the Kaluđer, at about 192 metres (630 ft) above sea level.

== Demography ==
Ethnic groups in Slabinja

	1991	2011
Serbs	87.57 %	34.2 %
Croats	2.29 %	64.08 %
Others	10.14 %	1.72 %

According to the 2011 Croatian census, Slabinja had a total resident population of 348, or 16.7% of the total of the Hrvatska Dubica municipality. This figure, combined with an area of 17.89 square kilometres (6.9 sq mi), provides Slabinja with a population density figure of 19.45 inhabitants per square kilometre (50.4/sq mi). This is lower than the average population density of Croatia (at 75.8/km^{2} or 196/sq mi) and Sisak-Moslavina County (at 39/km^{2} or 101/sq mi). The village had 119 family households.

Ethnic Croats made up 64.08% (223/348) of Slabinja population while ethnic Serbs made up 34.2% (119/348). Twenty years before, according to the 1991 census, 87.57% of the village population were ethnic Serbs (458/523), 2.29% were ethnic Croats (12/523), 8.03% were Yugoslavs (42/523), and 2.1% and were of other ethnic origin (11/523).

Historical populations of Slabinja

Year	Pop.	±%
1857	609	—
1869	635	+4.3%
1880	671	+5.7%
1890	794	+18.3%
1900	877	+10.5%
1910	962	+9.7%
1921	880	−8.5%
1931	937	+6.5%
1948	495	−47.2%

Year	Pop.	±%
1953	563	+13.7%
1961	590	+4.8%
1971	520	−11.9%
1981	490	−5.8%
1991	523	+6.7%
2001	317	−39.4%
2011	348	+9.8%
2021	251	−27.9%

Source: Settlements and Population of the Republic of Croatia 1857–2001, Croatian Bureau of Statistics, Zagreb, 2005

== Economy ==
The main economic activities are agriculture and livestock, while young people mostly work in nearby cities.

In the 19th century, it was noted that the area was good for tobacco growing.

== Landmarks ==
Monument to Fallen Fighters and Victims of Fascism from Slabinja during World War II in Yugoslavia was built in 1981. The monument was unveiled on 30 May 1981.

A Roman milestone engraved with names of Roman emperor Gallus (reigned 251–253) and his son Volusian was founded near the village. The item was redeemed from the finder by the Croatian National Museum in 1895.

== Transport ==
Travellers historically used the Una Valley as a route to and from the village. A Roman road from Siscia to Dubica was the most common path. The major D47 state road from Dvor to Lipik runs through Slabinja. It is connecting the village to the Croatian motorway network at the A3 motorway Novska interchange and the D6 state road in Dvor.

Slabinja has several bus stops on the D47 road for intercity buses which connects Hrvatska Dubica and Hrvatska Kostajnica. The closest railway station is the Dubica railway station, 14 kilometres (8.7 mi) southeast of the village. Trains from Dubica run east to Jasenovac and north-west to Sunja and Sisak.

The closest airport is Banja Luka International Airport in Bosnia and Herzegovina, 75 kilometres (47 mi) south-southeast of Slabinja.

== Education ==
A school for children was established in Slabinja in 1843. The school building was built in 1944.

== Religious sites ==
Religion in Slabinja
religion	percent
Roman Catholicism	61.08%
Eastern Orthodoxy	31.12%
Atheism or Agnosticism	4.57%
Others and unspecified	3.23%

In the Serbian Orthodox Church administrative division, Slabinja belongs to the Kostajnica Parish of the Eparchy of upper Karlovac. In the Roman Catholic Church administration belongs to the Holy Trinity Parish from Dubica, Dubica-Kostajnica Deanery of Diocese of Sisak.

=== Serbian Orthodox Church ===
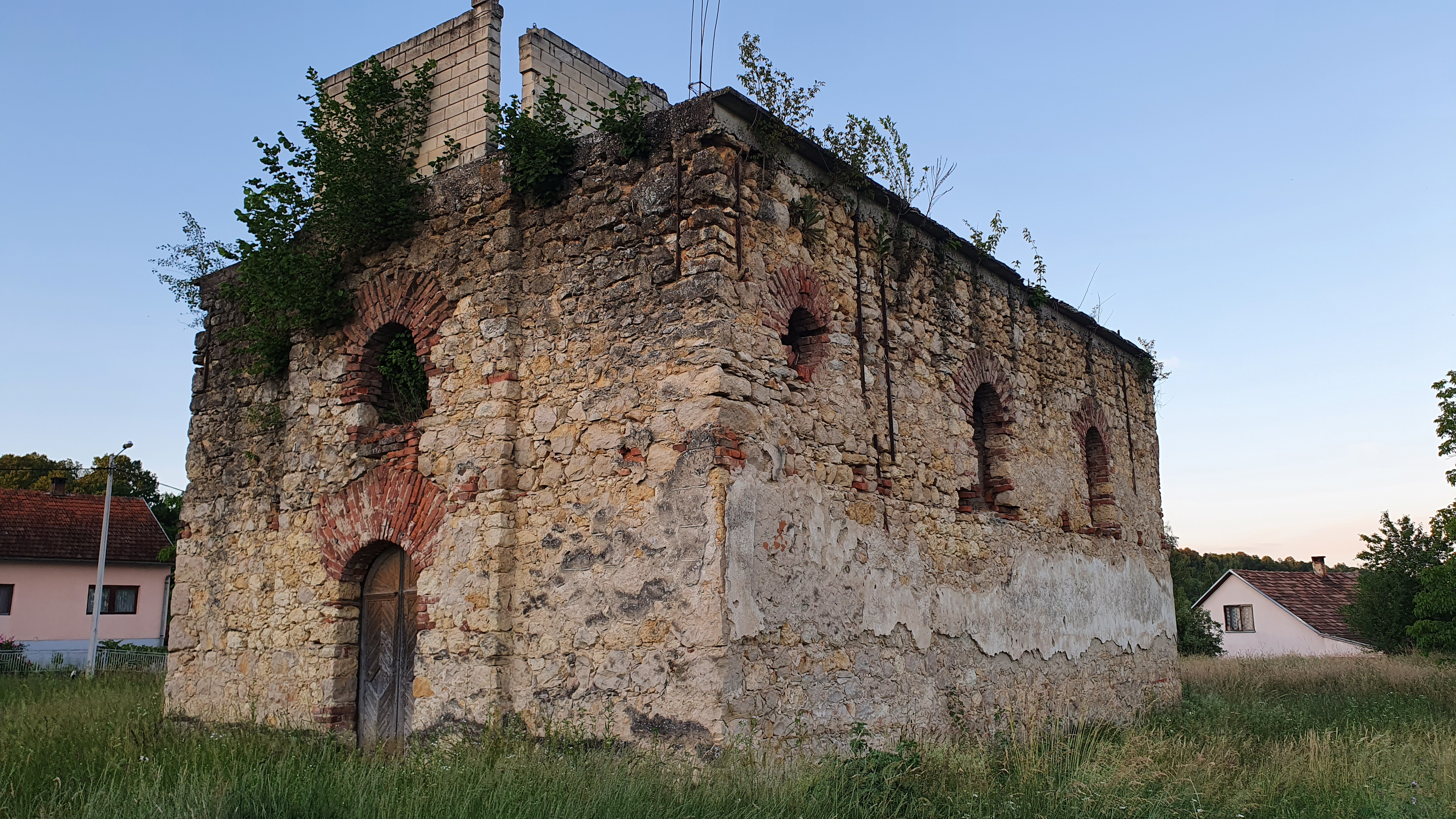
Ruins of the Church of Saint Parascheva in 2020

On the south side of the D47 road, towards the river Una, are ruins of the Church of Saint Parascheva. The church was built in 1828. In 1944, during World War II, it was mined by the Ustasha damaging roof structure, vault, interior, and church inventory. After World War II ruins remained standing. In 1970 began the reconstruction of these valuable buildings, but the roof, unfortunately, was never set up. The church is located in the center of the village.

== Notable people ==
Serbian Orthodox cleric German (Opačić), who was the Bishop of Bačka, was born in Slabinja in 1857. Milka Dudunić, the wife of Stjepan Mesić, the President of Croatia (2000–10) was born there in 1939. Zdravko Kolar, a Yugoslav Air Force Major General and a full professor at the University of Belgrade, was born in the village in 1923. Kolar was a doctor of pedagogy and a recipient of the Commemorative Medal of the Partisans of 1941.

== Footers ==
=== See also ===
- List of Yugoslav World War II monuments and memorials in Croatia
- Parascheva of the Balkans
