= Academician Sakharov Avenue, Moscow =

Avenue in the Central Administrative District of Moscow

Coordinates: 55.7708°N 37.6444°E

Academician Sakharov Avenue
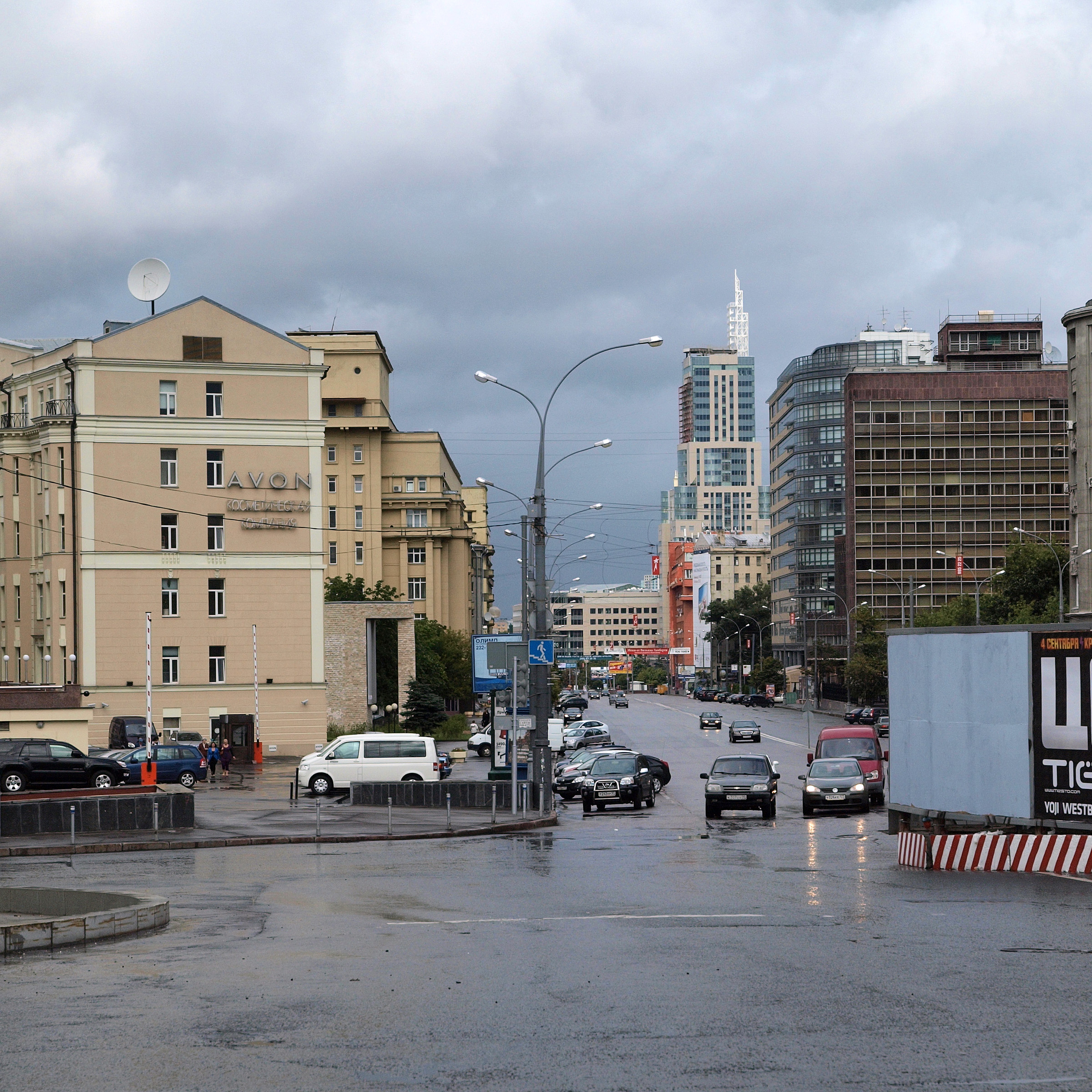
- The southern end of the avenue
- Interactive map of Academician Sakharov Avenue
- Native name: Проспект Академика Сахарова (Russian)
- Location: Moscow, Russia; Central Administrative Okrug; Krasnoselsky District
- Nearest metro station: Komsomolskaya (Sokolnicheskaya Line and Koltsevaya Line), Chistye Prudy, Turgenevskaya, Sretensky Bulvar

Academician Sakharov Avenue (Russian: Проспект Академика Сахарова, Prospekt Akademika Sakharova) is a street in the center of Moscow, in Krasnoselsky District. In the south, the street is limited by Turgenevskaya Square and the Boulevard Ring. In the north, Academician Sakharov Prospect ends at the T-shape crossing with Kalanchyovskaya Street, close to Komsomolskaya Square. In the middle, it crosses the Garden Ring (Sadovaya-Spasskaya Street).

The avenue was named in 1990 and commemorates Andrei Sakharov, a physicist and a Nobel Peace Prize winner.

== History ==
The general plan of the development of Moscow released in 1935 suggested that a wide avenue should be built between Lubyanka Square in the center of Moscow and Komsomolskaya Square, which contains three of the main railway stations in Moscow. The entire blocks of historical buildings were to be demolished. It was decided that a number of administrative buildings, including ministries, would be built along the avenue. Some of the projects, including the building of People's Commissariat for Agriculture by Alexey Shchusev and Tsentrosoyuz building by Le Corbusier were completed, however, the avenue was not built because of the war. The construction only resumed in the 1960s, with a number of modernist and post-modernist buildings. It was decided that after completion, the avenue will get the name of Novokirovsky Avenue (Russian: Новокировский проспект), however, the stretch to Turgenevskaya Square was only completed in the end of the 1980s, and the avenue got the name of Andrey Sakharov. The extension to Lubyanka Square has never been realized.
