= German Opačić =

Serbian Orthodox prelate (1857–1899)

German
- Bishop of Bačka
- Native name: Герман
- Church: Serbian Orthodox Church
- Diocese: Eparchy of Bačka
- Elected: 1893
- Installed: 1894
- Term ended: 1899
- Predecessor: Vasilijan Petrović
- Successor: Mitrofan Šević

Orders
- Ordination: 24 April 1888 (aged 30) by German
- Consecration: 6 May 1894 by Georgije

Personal details
- Born: Milan Opačić; 8 August 1857 Slabinja, Kingdom of Croatia, Austrian Empire
- Died: 18 January 1899 (aged 41) Vienna, Austria-Hungary
- Buried: Novi Sad, Austria-Hungary (now Serbia)
- Denomination: Serbian Orthodox

German Opačić (Serbian Cyrillic: Герман Опачић; 8 August 1857 – 18 January 1899) was the Serbian Orthodox prelate and a Bishop of Bačka.

== Early life and education ==
Opačić was born as Milan Opačić (Serbian Cyrillic: Милан Опачић) on 8 August 1857 in the village of Slabinja, in the Banija region in Austrian Empire (present-day Croatia). His father Marko was a Serbian Orthodox priest and mother Sofia was a priest-wife. After finishing elementary school in Vojnić, Opačić graduated from a gymnasium in Zagreb and Novi Sad. For a while he studied law in Zagreb, but he graduated from Clerical High School of Saint Arsenije in 1884. From 1884 to 1890, Opačić was catechist in gymnasium, and from 1889 was a professor of seminary.

== Spiritual service ==
Opačić became consistory-notary of Archeparchy of Karlovci in 1890. He entered the Kuveždin monastery on the Fruška Gora mountain where he was spiritually guided by hegumen Amfilohije (Jeremić) and became a monk.

Opačić was ordained by Archbishop of Karlovci and Serbian Patriarch German as deacon-monk on 24 April 1888. On 13 December 1890 he was ordained as protodeacon, and on 6 October 1891 as archdeacon by Patriarch Georgije.

Opačić was ordained on Christmas Day in 1891 as presbyter and as syncellus on same occasion. In 1892, he was ordained as protosyncellus.

Opačić was unanimously elected as the Bishop of Bačka in 1893 and consecrated on Saint George's Day in 1894 by Patriarch Georgije, Bishop of Timișoara Nikanor Popović and Bishop of Gornji Karlovac Mihailo Grujić.

== Death ==
After a short illness, Opačić died in Vienna in January 1899. He was buried in Plato's chapel at the Almaš Cemetery in Novi Sad, Austria-Hungary (present-day Serbia).

== See also ==
- Eparchy of Bačka

Eastern Orthodox Church titles
Preceded by Vasilijan	Bishop of Bačka; 1893–1899	Succeeded by Mitrofan
