= Solomon R. Guggenheim Museum =

Art museum in Manhattan, New York

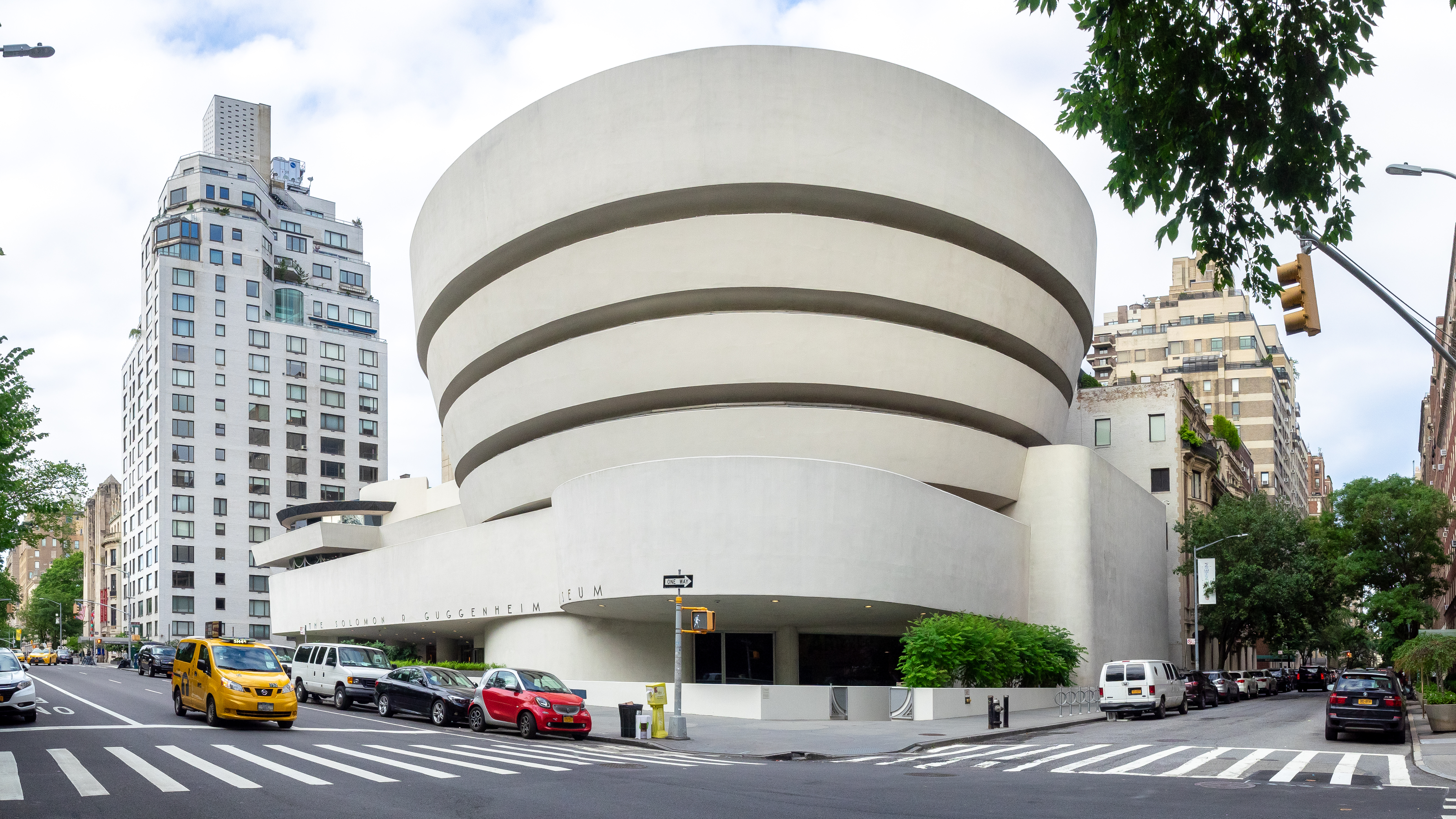
- View from Fifth Avenue
- Established: 1939
- Location: 1071 Fifth Avenue at 89th Street; Manhattan, New York City
- Coordinates: 40°46′59″N 73°57′32″W
- Type: Art museum
- Visitors: 861,000 (2023)
- Director: Mariët Westermann
- Public transit access: Subway: trains at 86th Street; Bus: M1, M2, M3, M4, M86 SBS
- Website: www.guggenheim.org

History
- Built: 1956–1959

Site notes
- Architect: Frank Lloyd Wright
- Architectural style: Modern

UNESCO World Heritage Site
- Criteria: Cultural: (ii)
- Designated: 2019 (43rd session)
- Part of: The 20th-Century Architecture of Frank Lloyd Wright
- Reference no.: 1496-008
- Region: North America

U.S. National Register of Historic Places
- Designated: May 19, 2005
- Reference no.: 05000443

U.S. National Historic Landmark
- Designated: October 6, 2008

New York State Register of Historic Places
- Designated: March 25, 2005
- Reference no.: 06101.008546

New York City Landmark
- Designated: August 14, 1990
- Reference no.: 1774 (exterior), 1775 (interior)

The Solomon R. Guggenheim Museum, often referred to as The Guggenheim, is an art museum at 1071 Fifth Avenue between 88th and 89th Streets on the Upper East Side of Manhattan in New York City. It hosts a permanent collection of Impressionist, Post-Impressionist, early Modern and contemporary art and also features special exhibitions throughout the year. It was established by the Solomon R. Guggenheim Foundation in 1939 as the Museum of Non-Objective Painting, under the guidance of its first director, Hilla von Rebay. The museum adopted its current name in 1952, three years after the death of its founder Solomon R. Guggenheim. It continues to be operated and owned by the Solomon R. Guggenheim Foundation.

The museum's building, a landmark work of 20th-century architecture designed by Frank Lloyd Wright, drew controversy for the unusual shape of its display spaces and took 15 years to design and build; it was completed in 1959. It consists of a six-story, bowl-shaped main gallery to the south, a four-story "monitor" to the north, and a ten-story annex to the northeast. A six-story helical ramp extends along the main gallery's perimeter, under a central ceiling skylight. The Thannhauser Collection is housed within the top three stories of the monitor, and there are additional galleries in the annex and a learning center in the basement. The museum building's design was controversial when it was completed but was widely praised afterward. The building underwent extensive renovations from 1990 to 1992, when the annex was built, and it was renovated again from 2005 to 2008.

The museum's collection has grown over the decades and is founded upon several important private collections, including those of Guggenheim, Karl Nierendorf, Katherine Sophie Dreier, Justin Thannhauser, Rebay, Giuseppe Panza, Robert Mapplethorpe and the Bohen Foundation. The collection, which includes around 8,000 works as of 2022, is shared with sister museums in Bilbao and Venice. In 2023, nearly 861,000 people visited the museum.

== History ==
=== Early years and Hilla Rebay ===
Solomon R. Guggenheim, a member of a wealthy mining family, began collecting works of the old masters in the 1890s. In 1926, he met artist Hilla von Rebay, who introduced him to European avant-garde art, in particular abstract art that she felt had a spiritual and utopian aspect (non-objective art). Guggenheim completely changed his collecting strategy, turning to the work of Wassily Kandinsky, among others. He began to display his collection to the public at his apartment in the Plaza Hotel in New York City. Guggenheim and Rebay initially considered building a museum at Rockefeller Center in Manhattan. As the collection grew, in 1937 Guggenheim established the Solomon R. Guggenheim Foundation to foster the appreciation of modern art.

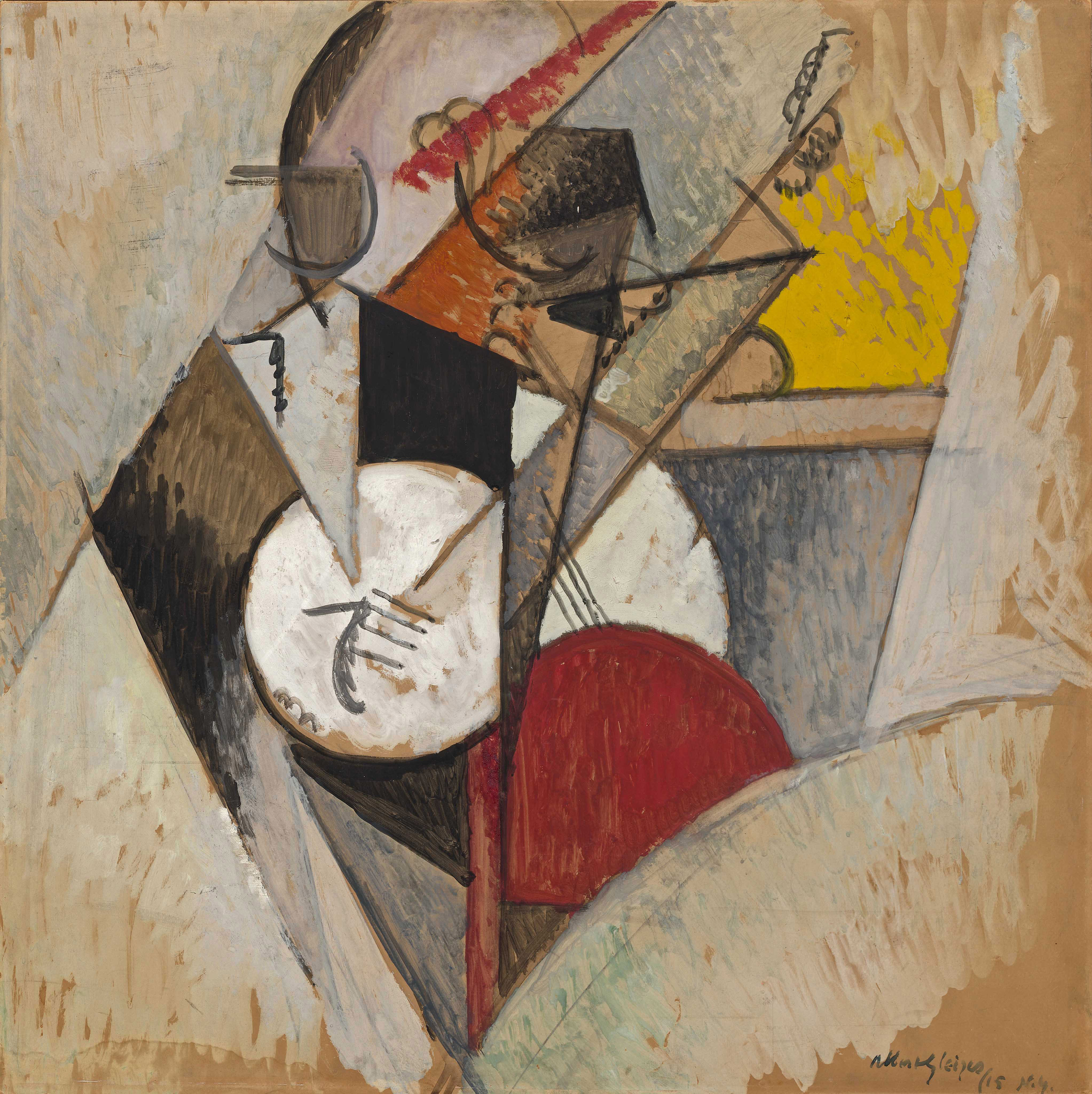
Albert Gleizes, 1915, Composition for "Jazz", oil on cardboard, 73 × 73 cm

The foundation's first venue, the Museum of Non-Objective Painting, opened at 24 East 54th Street in midtown Manhattan in 1939, under Rebay's direction. Under her guidance, Guggenheim sought to include in the collection the most important examples of non-objective art by early modernists. He wanted to display the collection at the 1939 New York World's Fair in Queens, but Rebay advocated for a more permanent location in Manhattan. By the early 1940s, the foundation had accumulated such a large collection of avant-garde paintings that the need for a permanent museum was apparent, and Rebay wanted to establish it before Guggenheim died.

==== Design process ====
In 1943, Rebay and Guggenheim wrote a letter to Frank Lloyd Wright asking him to design a structure to house and display the collection. Rebay thought the 76-year-old Wright was dead, but Guggenheim's wife Irene Rothschild Guggenheim knew better and suggested that Rebay contact him. Wright accepted the opportunity to experiment with his "organic" style in an urban setting, saying that he had never seen a museum that was "properly designed". He was hired to design the building in June 1943. He was to receive a 10 percent commission on the project, which was expected to cost at least $1 million. It took him 15 years, more than 700 sketches and six sets of working drawings to create and complete the museum, after a series of difficulties and delays; the cost eventually doubled from the initial estimate.

Rebay envisioned a space that would facilitate a new way of seeing modern art. She wrote Wright that "each of these great masterpieces should be organized into space, and only you ... would test the possibilities to do so. ... I want a temple of spirit, a monument!" Critic Paul Goldberger later wrote that Wright's modernist building was a catalyst for change, making it "socially and culturally acceptable for an architect to design a highly expressive, intensely personal museum. In this sense almost every museum of our time is a child of the Guggenheim." The Guggenheim is the only museum Wright designed; its urban location required him to design it in a vertical rather than horizontal form, far different from his earlier, rural works. Since he was not licensed as an architect in New York, he relied on Arthur Cort Holden, of the architectural firm Holden, McLaughlin & Associates, to deal with New York City's Board of Standards and Appeals.

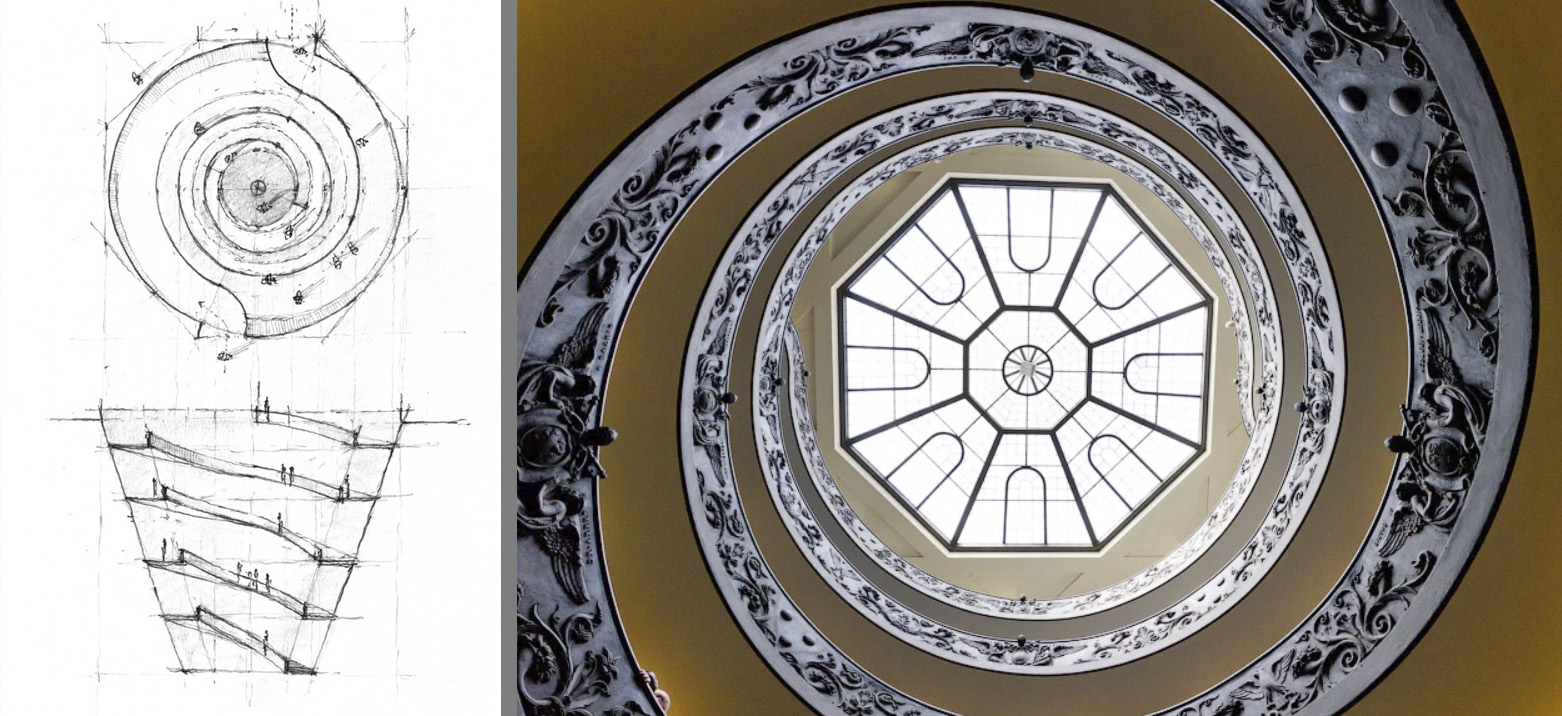
Staircase at the Vatican Museums designed by Giuseppe Momo in 1932

From 1943 to early 1944, Wright produced four differing designs. One had a hexagonal shape and level floors for the galleries, though all the others had circular schemes and used a ramp continuing around the building. (Note: Wright had experimented with a ramp design as early as 1924, when he had drawn plans for a visitor center at Sugarloaf Mountain in Maryland, which was never built. He later used the ramp design at the V. C. Morris Gift Shop in San Francisco, completed in 1948, and at the David and Gladys Wright House in Arizona, which he completed for his son in 1952.) In his notes, he indicated that he wanted a "well proportioned floor space from bottom to top—a wheel chair going around and up and down". His original concept was called an inverted "ziggurat", because it resembled the steep steps on the ziggurats built in ancient Mesopotamia. Several architecture professors have speculated that the helical ramp and glass dome of Giuseppe Momo's 1932 staircase at the Vatican Museums was an inspiration for Wright's ramp and atrium.

==== Site selection and announcement of plans ====
Wright expected that the museum would be in lower Manhattan. Instead, in March 1944, Rebay and Guggenheim acquired a site on Manhattan's Upper East Side, at the corner of 89th Street and the Museum Mile section of Fifth Avenue, overlooking Central Park. They considered numerous locations in Manhattan, as well as the Riverdale section of the Bronx, overlooking the Hudson River. Guggenheim felt that the Fifth Avenue site's proximity to Central Park was important, as the park afforded relief from the noise, congestion and concrete of the city. Wright's preliminary sketches fit the site nearly perfectly, although the site was about 25 feet (7.6 m) narrower than what Wright anticipated. Guggenheim approved Wright's sketches in mid-1944. Wright called the planned building an "Archeseum ... a building in which to see the highest".

Wright's designs were announced in July 1945, and the museum was expected to cost $1 million and be completed within a year. The structure's main feature was a main gallery with a helical ramp, surrounding a lightwell with a skylight. Guests would board an elevator to reach the top; a second, steeper ramp would serve as an emergency exit. There would be a movie theater in the basement, an elevator tower topped by an observatory, and a smaller building featuring a smaller theater, in addition to storage space, a library and a cafe. Preliminary plans also included apartments for Guggenheim and Rebay, but these plans were scrapped. Guggenheim acquired an additional parcel of land on 88th Street that July. Wright built a model of the museum at Taliesin, his home in Wisconsin, and displayed it at the Plaza Hotel that September.

==== Difficulties ====
The building's construction was delayed, first because of material shortages caused by World War II, then by increasing construction costs after the war. By late 1946, Guggenheim and Rebay had redesigned the basement theater to accommodate concerts. Rebay and Wright disagreed over several aspects of the design, such as the means by which the paintings were to be mounted, although they both wanted the design to "reflect the unity of art and architecture". Wright continued to modify his plans during the late 1940s, largely because of concerns over the building's lighting, and created another model of the museum in 1947. The collection was greatly expanded in 1948 through the purchase of art dealer Karl Nierendorf's estate of some 730 works.

Progress remained stalled through the late 1940s, and William Muschenheim renovated an existing townhouse on the site, at 1071 Fifth Avenue, for the museum's use. Guggenheim's health was in decline, but he refused Wright's offer to downsize the planned building so it could be completed during Guggenheim's lifetime. After Guggenheim died in 1949, members of the Guggenheim family on the foundation's board of directors had personal and philosophical differences with Rebay. Under Rebay's leadership, the museum had become what Aline B. Saarinen described as an "esoteric, occult place in which a mystic language was spoken". Some of the museum's staff and trustees wished to oust Rebay and cancel Wright's design. Wright, however, persuaded several members of the Guggenheim family to acquire additional land on Fifth Avenue so his design could be developed in full.

To accommodate the growing collection, in August 1951 the Guggenheim Foundation acquired an apartment building at 1 East 88th Street to remodel for museum use. It now owned a continuous frontage on Fifth Avenue from 88th to 89th Street. This prompted Wright to redesign the new building yet again, proposing a multi-story annex with apartments behind the museum. The foundation also announced that the museum would start exhibiting "objective" works of art, as well as older artwork. Rebay, who disagreed with this policy, resigned as director of the museum in March 1952. Nevertheless, she left a portion of her personal collection to the foundation in her will. Shortly after Rebay resigned, Wright filed plans for the building, which was now projected to cost $2 million. It was renamed the Solomon R. Guggenheim Museum in 1952.

=== Sweeney era ===
James Johnson Sweeney was appointed the museum's director in October 1952. He expanded the foundation's collecting criteria, rejecting Rebay's dismissal of "objective" painting and sculpture, and started exhibiting some of the works placed in storage under Rebay's leadership. In 1953, the museum hosted a retrospective of Wright's work, "Sixty Years of Living Architecture", in a temporary pavilion Wright had designed.

==== Construction and opening ====
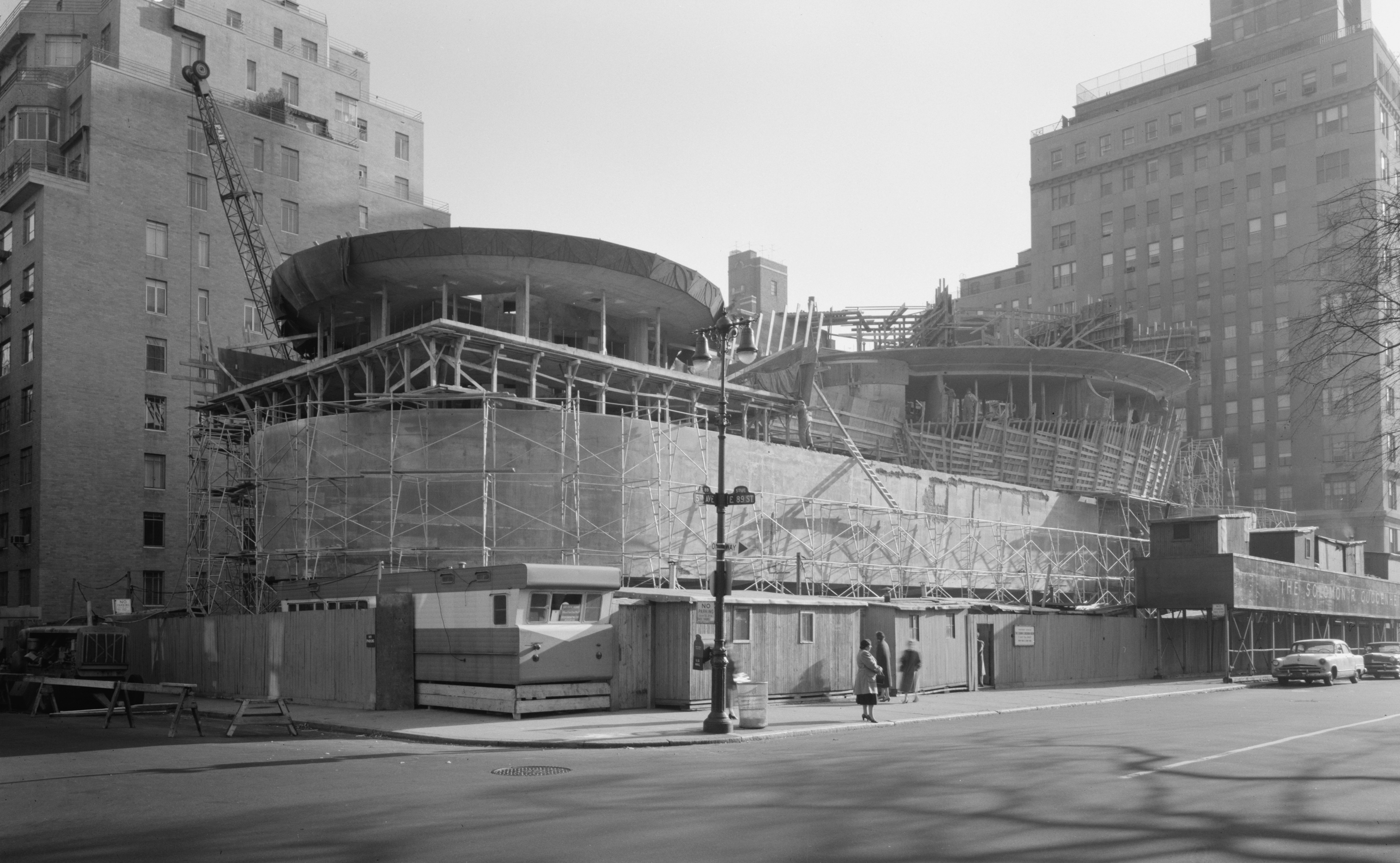
Photo of the construction, November 12, 1957

Sweeney and Wright had a strained relationship, as they disagreed over basic elements of the museum's plan. Sweeney, who believed its architecture should be subservient to the art, forced Wright to redesign it to accommodate more offices and storage facilities. The building's lighting was a significant point of contention between them. The New York City Department of Buildings (DOB) also rejected Wright's application for a construction permit in 1953 because the design did not meet building codes. Wright tasked Holden with ensuring that the design met codes and published revised drawings in 1954 and 1956. Museum staff nevertheless complained that Wright's design did not provide enough storage or laboratory space. To save money, he modified the design again in 1955, though these savings were canceled out by increasing construction costs.

Four general contractors submitted bids in late 1954, and the foundation ultimately hired the Euclid Construction Corporation. The museum rented the Oliver Gould Jennings House at 7 East 72nd Street and relocated there before construction began. On May 6, 1956, demolition of the site's existing buildings began. The DOB issued a construction permit on May 23, and work on the museum began on August 14. Wright opened an office in New York City to oversee the construction, which he felt required his personal attention, and appointed his son-in-law William Wesley Peters to supervise the day-to-day work. In practice, neither Wright nor Peters visited the site frequently, so Holden's William Short ended up managing the project.

Sweeney wanted the new museum to allow "building up a collection which offers up a standard of judgment". He wanted to change the color scheme, level out the sloping walls and remove the clerestory windows, which led to prolonged disputes with Wright. By early 1958, Harry F. Guggenheim had to handle all communications between Sweeney and Wright, who would not speak to each other. The building topped out in May 1958, and the scaffolding on the facade was removed by that August. Meanwhile, Wright published drawings of the design in several architectural magazines, as he feared the design would be compromised after his death. Against his request, Sweeney painted the walls white and hung paintings from metal bars instead of placing them directly on the walls. The building was Wright's last major work; he died in April 1959, six months before its opening.

The building soft-opened for members of the media on October 20, 1959. It was formally dedicated the next day, drawing 600 visitors per hour. Its design was generally able to accommodate the retrospectives and temporary exhibits that it hosted over the years.

=== Messer era ===
Sweeney resigned as the museum's director in July 1960, citing philosophical differences with the board of trustees, and H. H. Arnason took over as temporary director. He launched "the first survey of Abstract Expressionism in a New York museum" during his brief time as director. Thomas M. Messer, director of the Boston Institute of Contemporary Art, succeeded Sweeney as director in January 1961; he worked under Sweeney, who continued to run the foundation. Messer stayed for 27 years, the longest tenure of any director of a major New York art institution. Under his leadership, the museum's collection expanded significantly. The collection pivoted toward more contemporary artists, including those from Europe and Latin America, and expanded in scope to become "New York's second museum of modern art". Messer was not considered "an especially controversial director", though he also did not adhere to "the blockbuster school of exhibiting".

==== 1960s ====
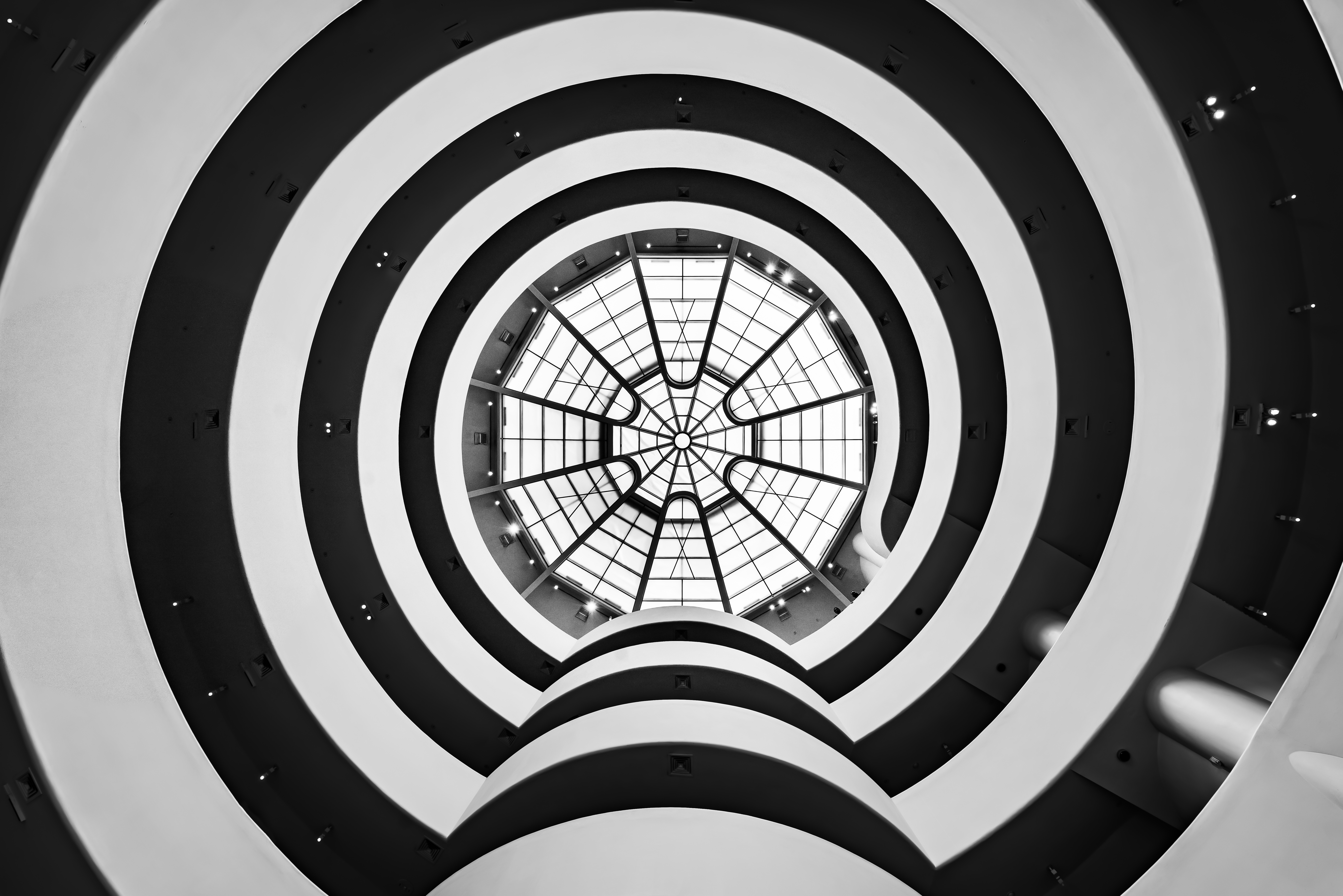
The skylight in the center of the museum

When Messer joined the Guggenheim, the museum's ability to present artworks was still doubted because of the tilted and curved walls. Almost immediately after becoming director, in 1962, he put on a large exhibition that combined the Guggenheim's paintings with sculptures on loan from the Hirshhorn collection. In particular, there were difficulties installing three-dimensional sculptures because the slope of the floor and the curvature of the walls could combine to produce vexing optical illusions. Though the combination proved generally to work well in the Guggenheim, Messer recalled that, at the time, "I was scared. I half felt that this would be my last exhibition." He had staged a smaller sculpture exhibition the previous year, where he learned how to compensate for the space's unusual geometry by constructing special plinths at a particular angle, but this was impossible for one piece, an Alexander Calder mobile whose wire inevitably hung at a true plumb vertical.

After Messer acquired a private collection from art dealer Justin Thannhauser in 1963, the Guggenheim hired Peters to renovate the monitor's second floor. Thannhauser's collection was displayed within the monitor after the renovation was completed in 1965. The foundation auctioned off artwork from the 15th and 16th centuries, which was incompatible with the museum's modern-art collection. Rebay, who died in 1967, bequeathed over 600 artworks to the Guggenheim, although the museum did not receive the collection until 1971. To raise money for further acquisitions, such as the works in Rebay's collections, the Guggenheim also sold off some modern artwork, including several Kandinsky works.

To accommodate the expanding collection, in 1963, the Guggenheim announced plans for a four-story annex, which the New York City Board of Standards and Appeals approved the next year. William Wesley Peters of Taliesin Associated Architects, the successor firm to Wright's practice, designed the addition. The annex was downsized to two stories in 1966 due to complaints from local residents, and was completed in 1968. This freed up space on the main gallery's top two levels, which had been used as workshops and storage space ever since the building opened. Museum officials opened the top levels to the public in 1968.

==== 1970s and 1980s ====
In 1971, with increasing costs and decreasing endowment income, the Guggenheim recorded a large deficit for the first time in its history. Additionally, although Wright had included space for a cafe at the southern end of the museum building, the space was instead used by the conservation and framing departments. The foundation proposed adding a lobby and restaurant in the museum's driveway area in early 1973 but had difficulty agreeing on the plans, which were revised that November. As part of the project, designed by Donald E. Freed, the museum closed its driveway and added a dining area and bookstore there. Facing a growing deficit and a shortage of exhibit space, the Guggenheim announced in 1977 that it would raise $20 million over the following five years. Museum officials also planned to expand the annex on 89th Street.

Messer became director of the Guggenheim Foundation in 1980 and continued to serve as the museum director, promoting two curators to directorial positions. The Guggenheim renovated the Thannhauser wing in the early 1980s. Following these changes, John Russell of The New York Times wrote that the Thannhauser Collection "may now be said to be the equivalent of the Frick in the domain of modern art." "Works & Process", a series of performances at the Guggenheim, commenced in 1984.

In 1982, Gwathmey Siegel & Associates Architects drew up designs for an 11-story annex on 88th Street behind the existing museum building. The original plan, announced in February 1985, would have been cantilevered over the existing building. The design was downsized to 10 stories in early 1987 due to opposition from local residents. At the time, the building could only exhibit 150 pieces, about 3 percent of the museum's 5000-work collection. In anticipation of the annex's construction and a wider-ranging renovation of the older building, Gwathmey Siegel also renovated the Thannhauser wing's second floor and the top level of the main gallery's ramp in 1987. The Board of Standards and Appeals approved the 89th Street annex that October, despite continuing opposition. Messer retired the next month, on the 50th anniversary of the collection's founding. The New York City Board of Estimate approved plans for the Guggenheim's annex in 1988, and the New York Supreme Court upheld the Board of Estimate's decision.

=== Krens era ===
Thomas Krens, former director of the Williams College Museum of Art, took over as the director of both the museum and the foundation in January 1988. Over his nearly two-decade tenure, he led a rapid expansion of the museum's collections, and the museum mounted some of its most popular exhibitions, including "Africa: The Art of a Continent" in 1996; "China: 5,000 Years" in 1998; "Brazil: Body & Soul" in 2001; and "The Aztec Empire" in 2004. Unusual exhibitions included "The Art of the Motorcycle", an industrial design installation of motorcycles.

The Guggenheim Museum SoHo, designed by Arata Isozaki, opened in June 1992 at the corner of Broadway and Prince Street in SoHo, Manhattan. The SoHo building's exhibits included Marc Chagall and the Jewish Theater, Paul Klee at the Guggenheim Museum, Robert Rauschenberg: A Retrospective and Andy Warhol: The Last Supper. It did not meet visitor forecasts and closed in 2002.

==== 1990s ====
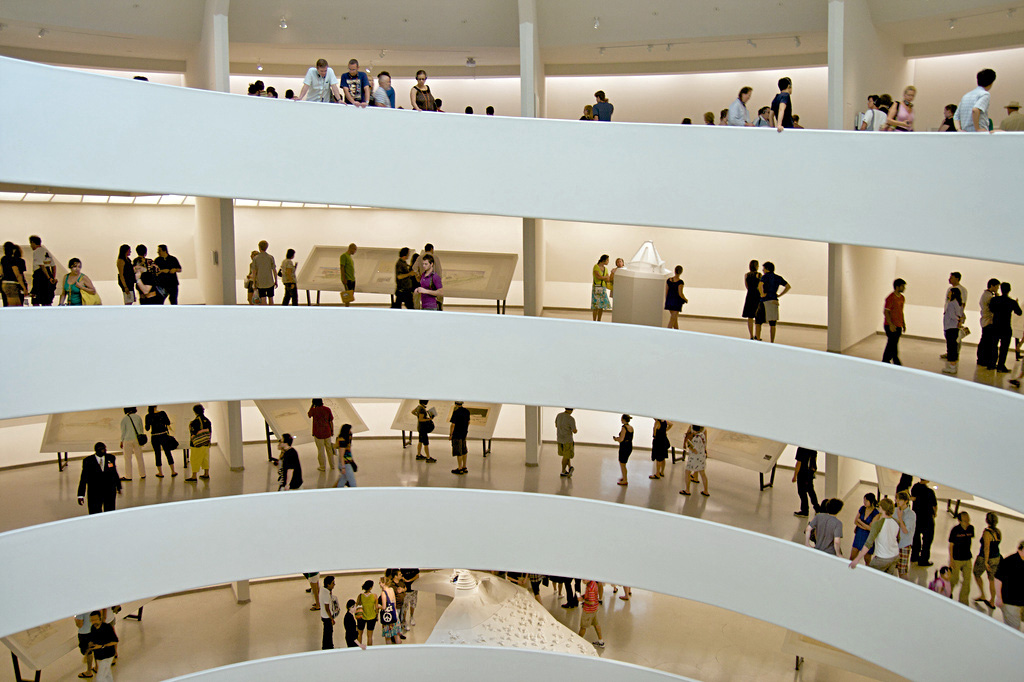
An interior view of the museum on a busy day

Shortly after becoming director, Krens decided to spend $24 million renovating the Guggenheim. Work commenced in late 1989. The museum initially remained open, but later closed for 18 months. The monitor wing was restored, the 88th Street wing was converted from a conservation laboratory to a restaurant, and additional exhibition space was created at the top of the main gallery. The 89th Street annex was built as part of this project, and the basement was extended under Fifth Avenue. The windows were replaced and the clerestory windows along the ramp were unsealed and restored to their original design. The building's exhibition space roughly doubled, allowing the museum to show 6 percent of its collection.

The renovation was completed on June 27, 1992. The museum's offices were moved to the annex, the basement and the former Guggenheim Museum SoHo, and storage space and conservation activities were moved to other buildings. The new annex allowed the museum to show more works from its permanent collection, as well as temporary exhibitions. The foundation acquired 200 photographs from Robert Mapplethorpe in 1992 and renamed the annex's fourth-floor gallery after him in 1993.

To finance the renovation and new acquisitions, the foundation sold works by Kandinsky, Chagall and Modigliani, raising $47 million. This move was controversial, drawing considerable criticism for trading masters for "trendy" latecomers. In The New York Times, critic Michael Kimmelman wrote that the sales "stretched the accepted rules of deaccessioning further than many American institutions have been willing to do." Krens defended the action as consistent with the museum's principles by expanding its international collection and building its "postwar collection to the strength of our pre-war holdings", and noted that museums regularly conduct such sales. He also expanded the foundation's international presence by opening museums abroad.

Krens was also criticized for his businesslike style and perceived populism and commercialization. One writer commented, "Krens has been both praised and vilified for turning what was once a small New York institution into a worldwide brand, creating the first truly multinational arts institution. ... Krens transformed the Guggenheim into one of the best-known brand names in the arts." The museum cut back its operating hours in 1994, causing a 25 percent decline in annual attendance, even as the city's other art museums saw increased attendance.

Samuel J. LeFrak announced in December 1993 that he would donate $10 million, the largest cash donation in the museum's history, with the Fifth Avenue building to be renamed for him and his wife. The next month, Ronald O. Perelman announced that he would also donate $10 million. The New York City Landmarks Preservation Commission (LPC), which had designated the building as a landmark, repeatedly refused to allow officials to place a sign with LeFrak's name outside the building. Consequently, LeFrak rescinded $8 million of his donation. Peter B. Lewis donated $10 million in 1995 for the restoration of the museum's auditorium, which was renamed the Peter B. Lewis Theater after the project was completed the next year. Lewis donated an additional $50 million in 1998, and several other trustees, including Perelman, increased their donations.

==== 2000s ====
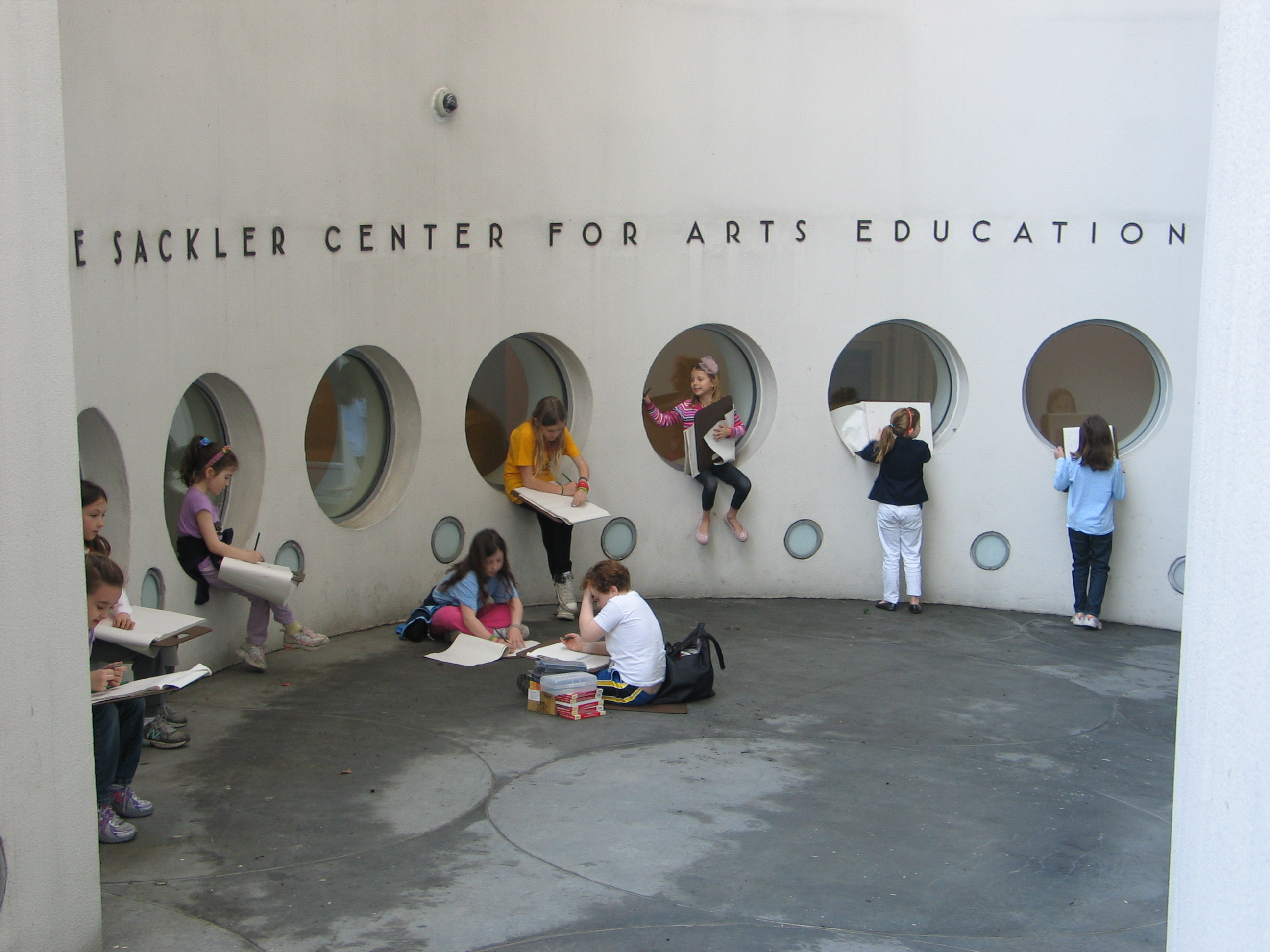
Students sketching at the entrance to the Engelberg Center

The museum opened an arts center in the basement in 2001; originally named for the Sackler family, it was renamed the Gail May Engelberg Center for Arts Education in 2022. Also in 2001, as part of a Frank Gehry retrospective at the museum, Gehry designed a canopy, which was installed outside the fifth floor. It remained in place for six years after the retrospective ended.

By 2004, museum officials were raising $25 million for another restoration of the building and hired Swanke Hayden Connell Architects to survey it. By then, the structure had developed numerous leaks. After architects and engineers determined that the building was structurally sound, renovations began in September 2005 to repair cracks and modernize systems and exterior details. The restoration mainly consisted of exterior and infrastructure upgrades, preserving as many historical details as possible while allowing museum operations to continue. On September 22, 2008, the Guggenheim celebrated the project's completion with the premiere of artist Jenny Holzer's tribute For the Guggenheim. The renovation cost $29 million and was funded by the Solomon R. Guggenheim Foundation's board of trustees, the city's Department of Cultural Affairs, the New York state government and MAPEI Corporation.

Meanwhile, during the early 2000s, Krens was involved in a long-running dispute with Lewis, who was also chairman of the foundation's board of directors. When admission declined by 60 percent following the September 11 attacks in 2001, the museum faced budgetary deficits, as one-quarter of its revenue came from ticket sales. Lewis donated $12 million to the museum in 2002 under the condition that Krens tighten the budget. Despite having given $77 million, more than any other donor in the Guggenheim's history, Lewis did not have as much influence over the board's decisions as did top donors at the city's other art museums. Lewis resigned from the board of directors in 2005, expressing opposition to Krens's plans for additional museums around the world.

Longtime curator Lisa Dennison was hired as the museum's new director in 2005, working under Krens, who continued to direct the foundation. By 2006, the museum faced a $35 million deficit, even as Dennison rejected the idea of funding exhibits through corporate sponsorships. Dennison resigned in July 2007 to work at auction house Sotheby's. Tensions between Krens and the board continued, and Krens stepped down as foundation director in February 2008.

=== Armstrong era ===
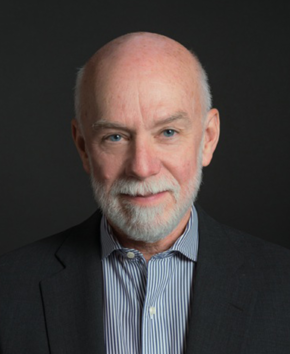
Richard Armstrong, 2012

Richard Armstrong, former director of the Carnegie Museum of Art, became the director of the museum and the foundation in November 2008. The New York Times said the Guggenheim Foundation had selected him because his "calmer, steadier presence" contrasted with the "nearly 20 often tumultuous years of Mr. Krens's maverick vision". In addition to its permanent collections, which continued to grow under his direction, the foundation has administered loan exhibitions and co-organized exhibitions with other museums to foster public outreach. The museum hosted exhibitions such as America (2016), one of the smallest ever hosted there.

About 140 maintenance workers and art installers joined a labor union in 2019, the first time the museum's employees had unionized. That year, Chaédria LaBouvier became the first black woman curator to create a solo exhibition and first black person to write a text published by the museum. She accused the museum of racism and alleged that, among other things, officials withheld resources and refused to let journalists interview her, though an article in The Atlantic described LaBouvier as being hostile toward people who commented on her exhibition. Within a month of these criticisms, the museum hired its first full-time black curator, Ashley James. An investigation by a law firm hired by the museum found "no evidence that Ms. LaBouvier was subject to adverse treatment on the basis of her race". The museum's Artistic Director and Chief Curator, Nancy Spector, left the institution in 2020 after 34 years. The Guggenheim approved a plan for increasing racial diversity in August 2020, and it hired a "chief culture and inclusion officer" in 2021.

During the COVID-19 pandemic, the Guggenheim temporarily closed in March 2020. It reopened that October, recording a monthly net loss of $1.4 million while closed. It fired numerous staff members during the pandemic. In 2022, the Guggenheim began hosting a poet-in-residence program, the first such program at a visual-art museum. Armstrong announced in mid-2022 that he planned to resign in 2023, and he left the museum at the end of 2023.

=== Westermann and Chiu ===
In June 2024, Mariët Westermann became the Guggenheim's first female director. She had been the vice chancellor of New York University Abu Dhabi since 2019, was its provost when it was formed in 2007 and was responsible for, among other things, its first climate action plan. She earned Master's and Ph.D. degrees in the History of Art from New York University Institute of Fine Arts. Amid finance difficulties at the museum, Westermann terminated about 7% of its staff in early 2025. Westermann subsequently became the Guggenheim Foundation's director and chief executive, overseeing the foundation's other museums.

Westermann hired Melissa Chiu, the Director of the Hirshhorn Museum and Sculpture Garden, to serve as the Solomon R. Guggenheim Museum's director from September 2026 onward.

== Architecture ==
Wright's design for the Guggenheim Museum incorporated geometric motifs, such as squares, circles, rectangles, triangles and lozenges. The massing contains two spiraling structures, the six-story main gallery to the south and the smaller "monitor" to the north, which are connected by a "bridge" on the second story. The ten-story rectangular annex, to the northeast, appears behind the spiraling structures as viewed from Central Park.

The building embodies Wright's attempts "to render the inherent plasticity of organic forms in architecture". Wright's design included details inspired by nature, although it also expresses his take on modernist architecture's rigid geometry. Wright described a symbolic meaning to the building's shapes: "[T]hese geometric forms suggest certain human ideas, moods, sentiments – as for instance: the circle, infinity; the triangle, structural unity; the spiral, organic progress; the square, integrity." Forms echo one another throughout: oval-shaped columns, for example, reiterate the geometry of the fountain. Circularity is the leitmotif, from the main gallery to the inlays in the museum's terrazzo floors.

=== Exterior ===
Wright originally wanted to construct a marble facade, but builder George N. Cohen constructed the facade of gunite, a type of sprayed concrete, as a cost-cutting measure. Wright's and Cohen's names appear on a tile placed along the building's exterior; this is likely the only time when Wright and a builder shared credit for a building's construction. Wright had also proposed a red-colored exterior, as he felt that white appeared "most sparingly for accent only" in nature. The red facade was never realized. Instead, the facade was covered in an ivory-colored coating of vinyl plastic, known as a "cocoon". The engineers involved in the original construction thought that the "cocoon" would not crack, so the facade was built without expansion joints; they were wrong: the facade cracked in subsequent years. During subsequent renovations, conservators found that the facade was originally painted brownish yellow, which was covered with numerous coats of white or off-white paint over the years.

The sidewalk in front of the museum acts as a forecourt, with metal circles inset into its surface, similar in design to the floor inside the museum. Next to the sidewalk are curving parapets that surround planting beds, some of which are below ground level. The planting beds originally contained shrubs, sycamore trees and other vegetation.

==== Original building ====
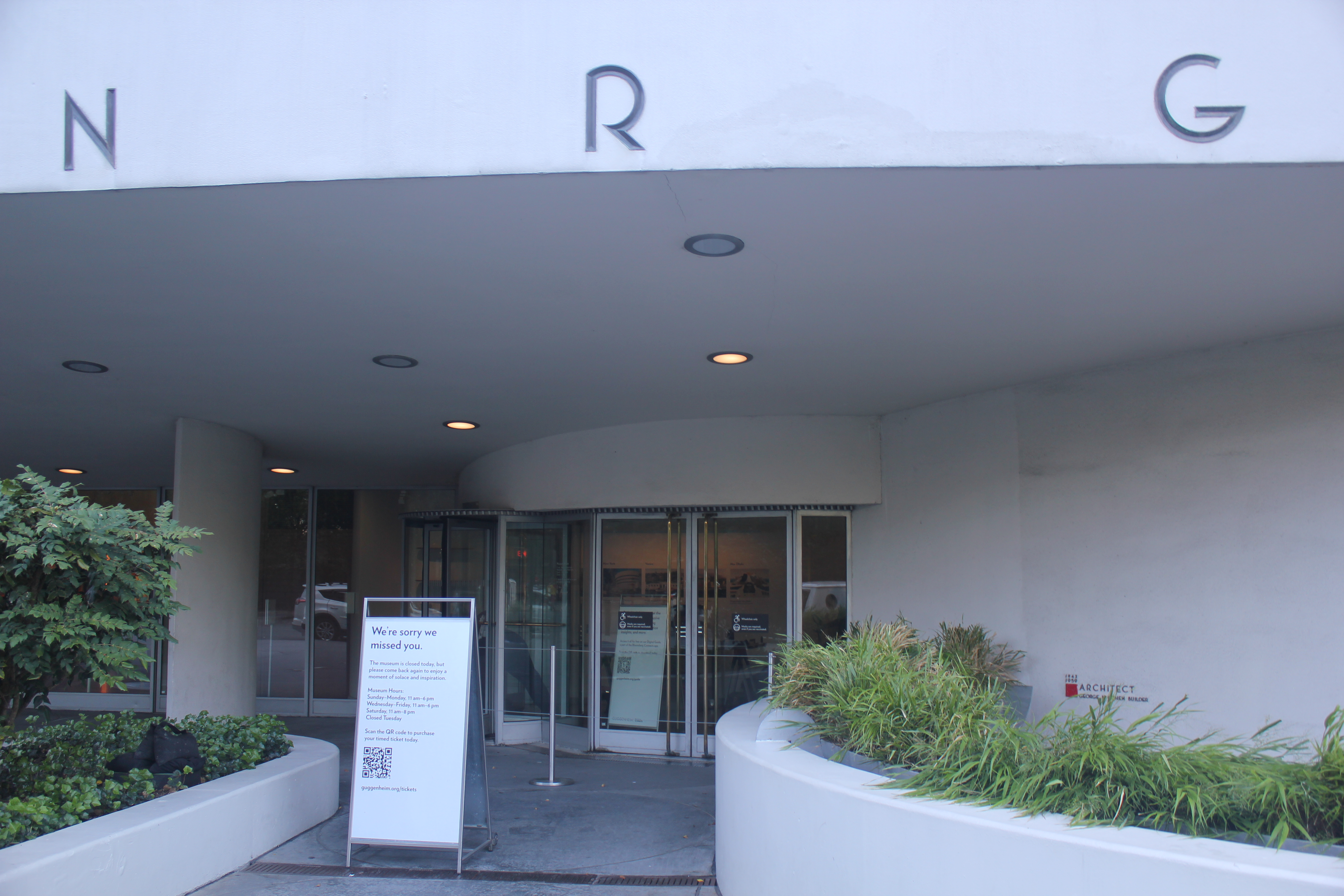
Main entrance on Fifth Avenue

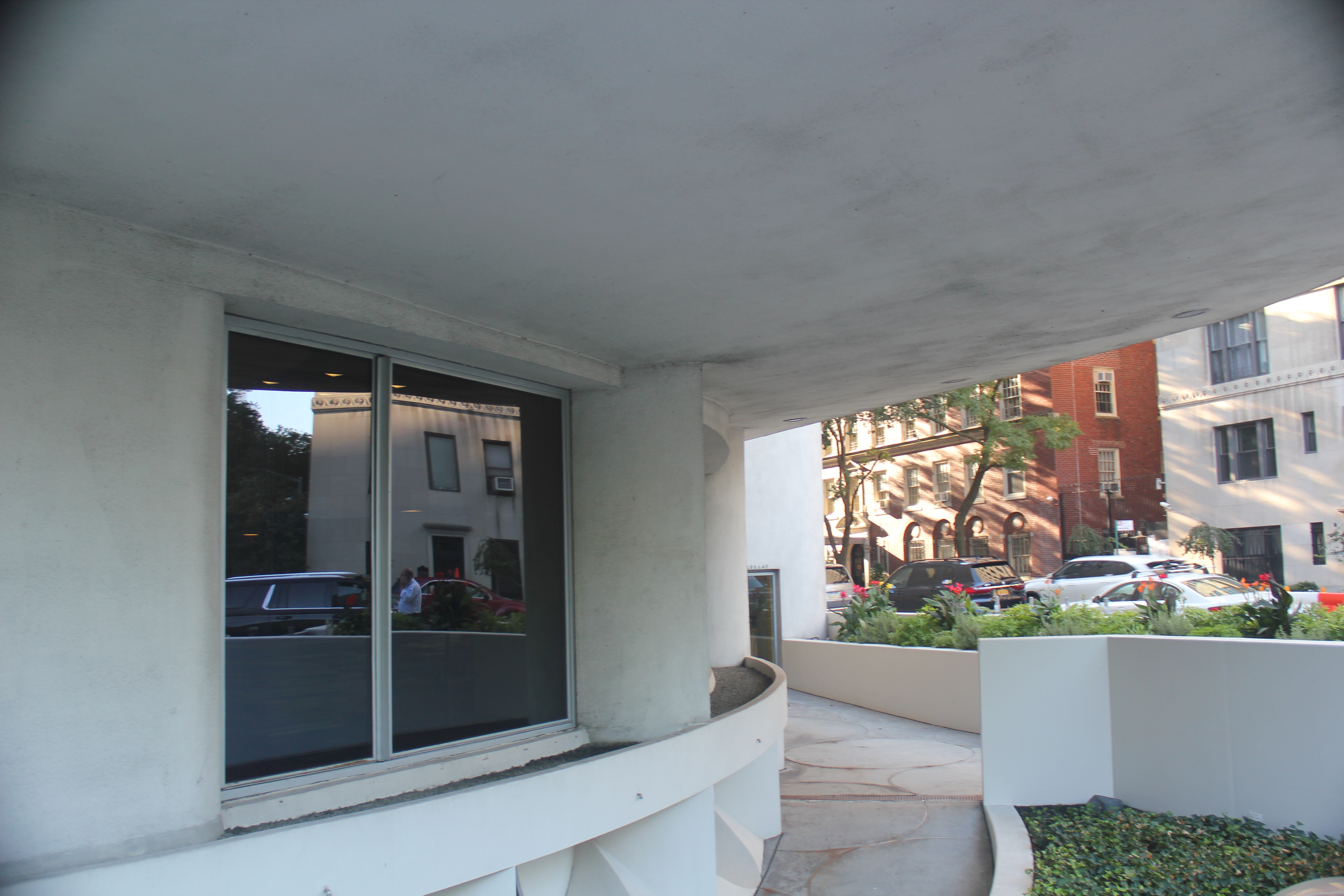
Ramp at the building's southwest corner

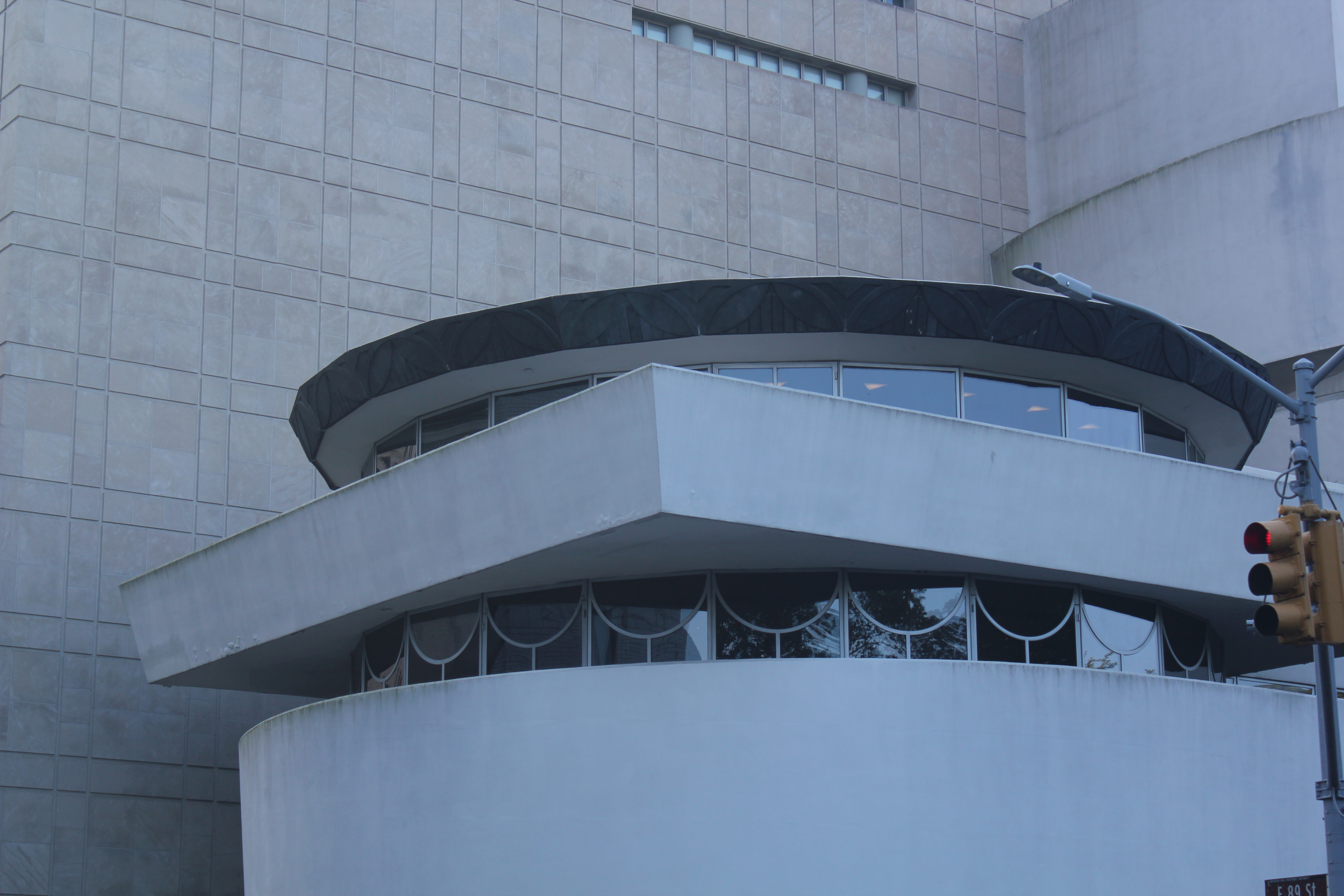
Close-up of the monitor/Thannhauser Collection wing

The museum's main entrance is at the center of the Fifth Avenue facade. It consists of an aluminum-framed glass wall with several doors, recessed within a low foyer. A doorway directly in front of the entrance leads to the bookstore, while the museum galleries are accessed by doors to the right. Above the main entrance is a "bridge" connecting the main gallery and monitor building, which is supported by several lozenge-shaped piers. The underside of the bridge contains recessed lighting that illuminates the main entrance. The main entrance was originally the entrance to a driveway that curved toward 89th Street, with separate entrances to the monitor and main gallery. The glass wall was installed after the driveway was closed in the 1970s, and the museum's bookstore was placed directly behind the wall. To the south of the main entrance is a curved wall, which forms the base of the main gallery. There is a ramp adjacent to this wall, which leads to the basement auditorium.

At the southeast corner of the museum, on 88th Street, is a rectangular structure, which contains no openings except for five circular portals at ground level. The structure contains the museum's cafe, which was part of Wright's original plans but was not developed until 1992. The second floor of the rectangular structure contains the High Gallery. Immediately to the east, on 88th Street, is an aluminum service gate with circular designs.

The bridge, which carries the Guggenheim's second story, projects at the museum's southwest corner. The museum's name stretches along the bottom edge of the bridge's Fifth Avenue facade. The main gallery rises above the southern part of the bridge; it consists of a "bowl"-shaped massing, with several concrete "bands" separated by recessed aluminum skylights. From the street, the building looks like a white ribbon curled into a cylindrical stack, wider at the top than the bottom, displaying nearly all curved surfaces. Its appearance is in sharp contrast to the typically rectangular Manhattan buildings that surround it, a fact relished by Wright, who claimed that his museum would make the nearby Metropolitan Museum of Art "look like a Protestant barn". At the top of the "bowl" is a parapet, which surrounds three smaller skylights, as well as the large twelve-sided dome atop the main gallery.

The northern part of the bridge contains a four-story wing, originally known as the monitor. Although the monitor's interior is cylindrical, its exterior contains different materials and shapes on each story. The monitor's first two stories contain a round concrete facade, while the upper two stories are cantilevered outward from the monitor's core. The third story contains rectangular aluminum windows with semicircular panes at their tops. The fourth story contains a square terrace and additional windows. Above the fourth story is a fascia with lozenge patterns, as well as a hexagonal roof with an aluminum frame. The roof is interrupted by a lozenge-shaped shaft, which contains a stairway.

==== Annex ====
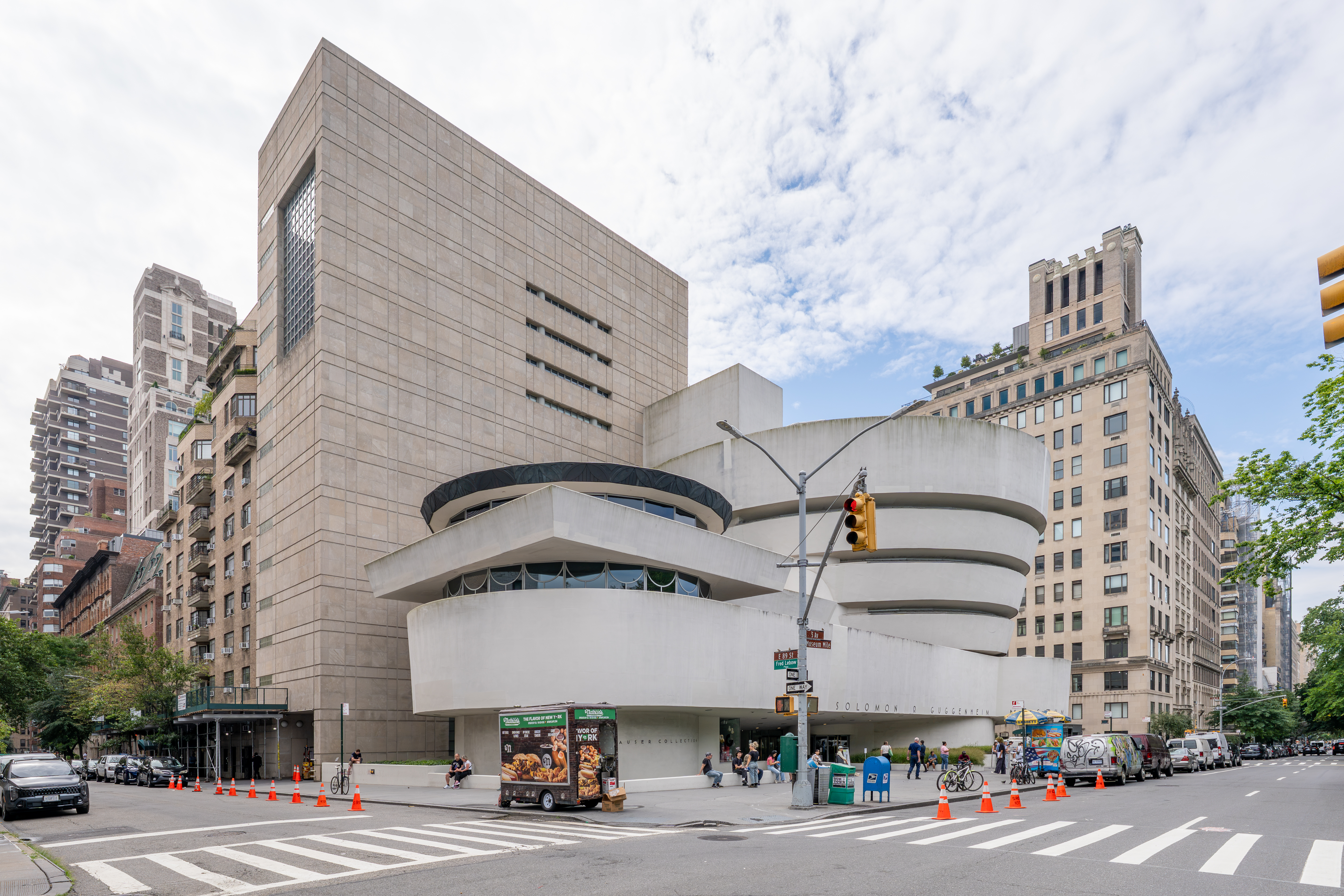
Museum from the northwest, with Annex at left

A ten-story tower at the museum's northeastern corner, with offices, artist's studios and apartments, included in Wright's 1951 plan for the museum, was a rectangular structure, aligned on a north–south axis; it would have contained porches at each story on the northern and southern elevations. Wright's original plan for the tower went unrealized, largely for financial reasons, until the 1990–1992 renovation and expansion. Wright's son-in-law William Wesley Peters instead designed a shorter wing on the site in 1968, with two double-height floors. This wing was made of concrete, with relief carvings of squares and octagons on its facade, and housed the museum's library, storage space and the Thannhauser Gallery. Its steel framework could accommodate the weight of six additional stories if it were expanded.

Gwathmey Siegel & Associates designed a 10-story annex that was built during the 1990s renovation. The annex, measuring 32 feet (9.8 m) wide and 135 feet (41 m) tall, uses the 1968 wing's steel framework. During the renovation, Gwathmey Siegel removed the 1968 concrete facade and replaced it with a limestone grid. They analyzed Wright's original sketches when they designed the tower.

=== Interior ===
The core part of Guggenheim's interior consists of the monitor section to the north, the larger main gallery to the south and a lecture hall beneath the main gallery. To the east of the main entrance is the bookstore, in the area that was originally part of the museum's driveway. To the south of the main entrance is a small circular vestibule, which contains a floor with metal arcs and a low plaster ceiling with recessed lighting. South of the main rotunda is a cafe, added during the 1990s renovation.

The triangular service core, at the northeast corner of the main gallery, contains an elevator and a staircase. The staircase wraps around the elevator, which is housed within a semicircular shaft; the core also contains restrooms and mechanical areas. According to author Robert McCarter, Wright had used "complete geometries" for the stairs and ramps because he wanted visitors to experience the museum on foot. Other rooms, such as the staff kitchen, were designed with curved equipment because of the interior's unusual design. The museum's interior is generally painted white, and parts of the interior are repainted nearly every day.

==== Main gallery ====
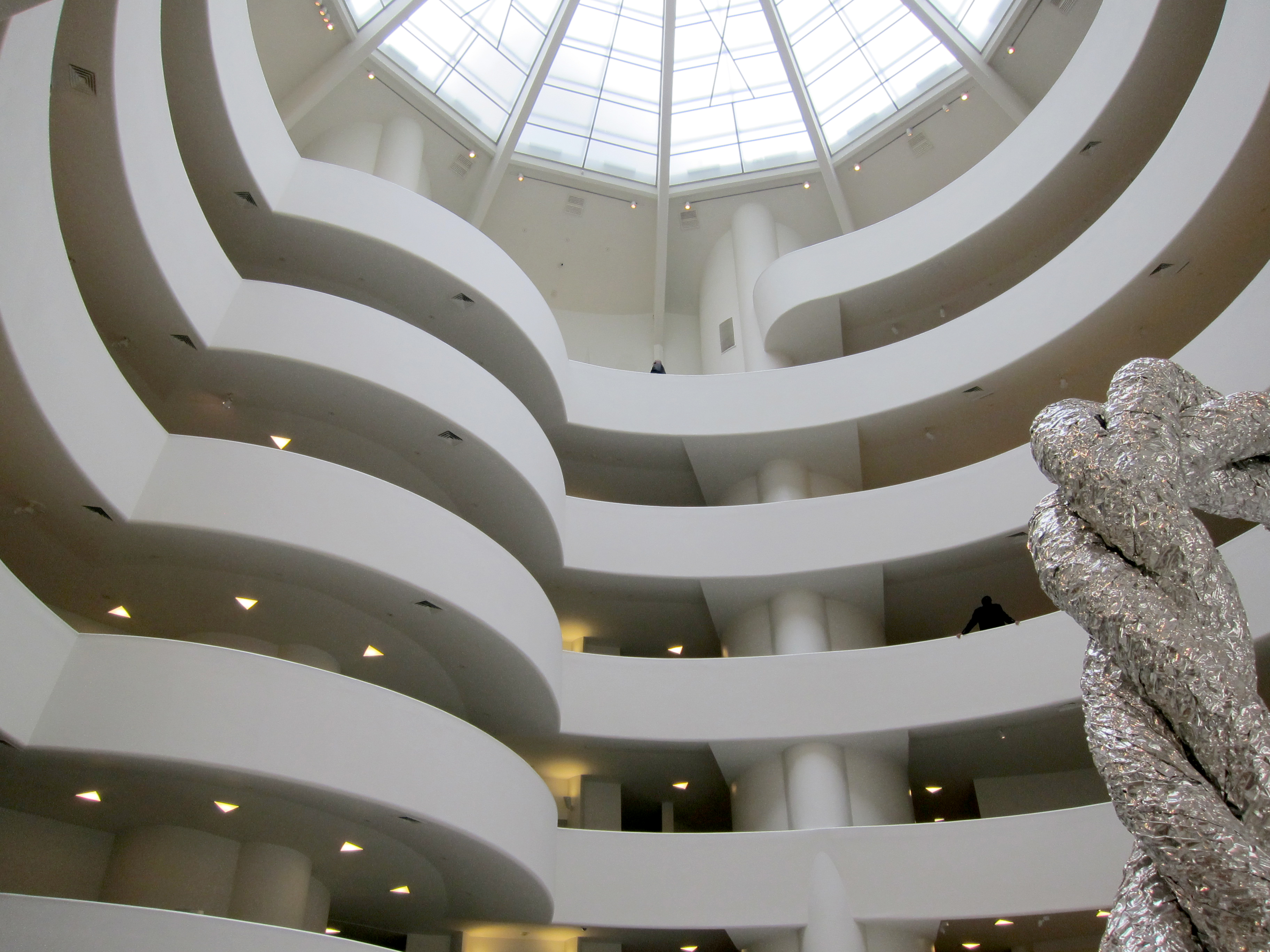
The museum's main gallery

Wright designed the main gallery (also described as a rotunda) as an open-air atrium, surrounded by a helical ramp. Wright's design differed from the conventional approach to museum layout, in which visitors pass through a series of interconnected rooms and retrace their steps when exiting. Under Wright's plan, guests rode an elevator to the top of the building and descended the ramp, viewing the main gallery itself as a work of art. The ramp's design recalled a nautilus shell, with continuous spaces flowing one into another. The open rotunda allows guests to observe works on different levels simultaneously and interact with guests on other levels. Structurally, the ramp acts like an enormous arch, preventing the columns in the main gallery from collapsing inward.

The main gallery has a beige terrazzo floor with inlaid metal circles. At ground level are wooden information and admissions desks, and windows face southeast toward Fifth Avenue and 88th Street. The ramp, made of reinforced concrete, ascends at a 5 percent slope from ground level and rises one story, where it wraps around a planter and passes through a double-height archway. It rises five additional stories before ending at the sixth floor, with a total length of 1,416 feet (432 m). Its width increases as it ascends, from 25 feet (7.6 m) on the lowest level to 32 feet (9.8 m) at the top. The ramp protrudes into the northeastern corner of the atrium at each story, forming a rounded balcony. There are connections to other galleries at the second and fourth stories, and to a triangular gallery at the sixth story. The ramp has a low parapet along the atrium side, measuring 36 inches (910 mm) high.

The walls and ceilings are made of plaster. To create the concrete walls, workers sprayed several layers of concrete onto plywood moldings, each layer being reinforced with steel. Wright intended the low ceilings and slanted walls to provide a "more intimate environment" to display the artwork. The walls are tilted at a 97-degree angle, and the ceilings measure 9.5 feet (2.9 m) tall. Jaroslav Josef Polívka assisted Wright with the structural design, and he initially designed the gallery ramp without perimeter columns. Later in the design, Wright added a dozen concrete ribs along the walls of the main gallery, which both provide structural reinforcement and divide the ramp into sections. The ramp passes through 70 sections in total. Although Wright wanted the paintings displayed as if they were on an easel, paintings are mounted onto horizontal bars that protrude from the sloped wall. There is limited space for sculptures within each bay, and wider paintings frequently span the center of the curved wall.

The ramp was originally illuminated by clerestory windows along the perimeter of each level, which were sealed when the building was completed. Each level of the ramp also contains recessed lighting on its ceiling. The domed skylight, named the Lawson-Johnston Family Oculus, is around 95 feet (29 m) high and is the same width as the atrium. Metal bars divide the skylight into numerous panes. Along the dome are six hairpin-shaped "spokes", which surround a circular glass panel and connect with the "ribs" along the gallery's perimeter. These spokes divide the skylight into twelve sections. The original plans called for the dome to be illuminated by 24 floodlights. The clerestory windows and skylight were restored in 1992.

==== Monitor section ====
The museum's "monitor" houses the Thannhauser Collection. Its galleries surround an atrium that is circular except for a stair hall at one end of the space. The floors are supported by columns with lozenge-shaped cross-sections. Like the main gallery, the monitor contains a triangular service core, although its core is placed at the center of the structure. The monitor was originally supposed to include apartments for Rebay and Guggenheim, but this area became offices and storage space. In 1965, the second floor of the monitor was renovated to display some of the museum's growing permanent collection. Part of the fourth floor was similarly converted in 1980. With the restoration of the museum in the early 1990s, the second through fourth floors were converted entirely to exhibition space and renamed the Thannhauser Building.

==== Gail May Engelberg Center for Arts Education ====
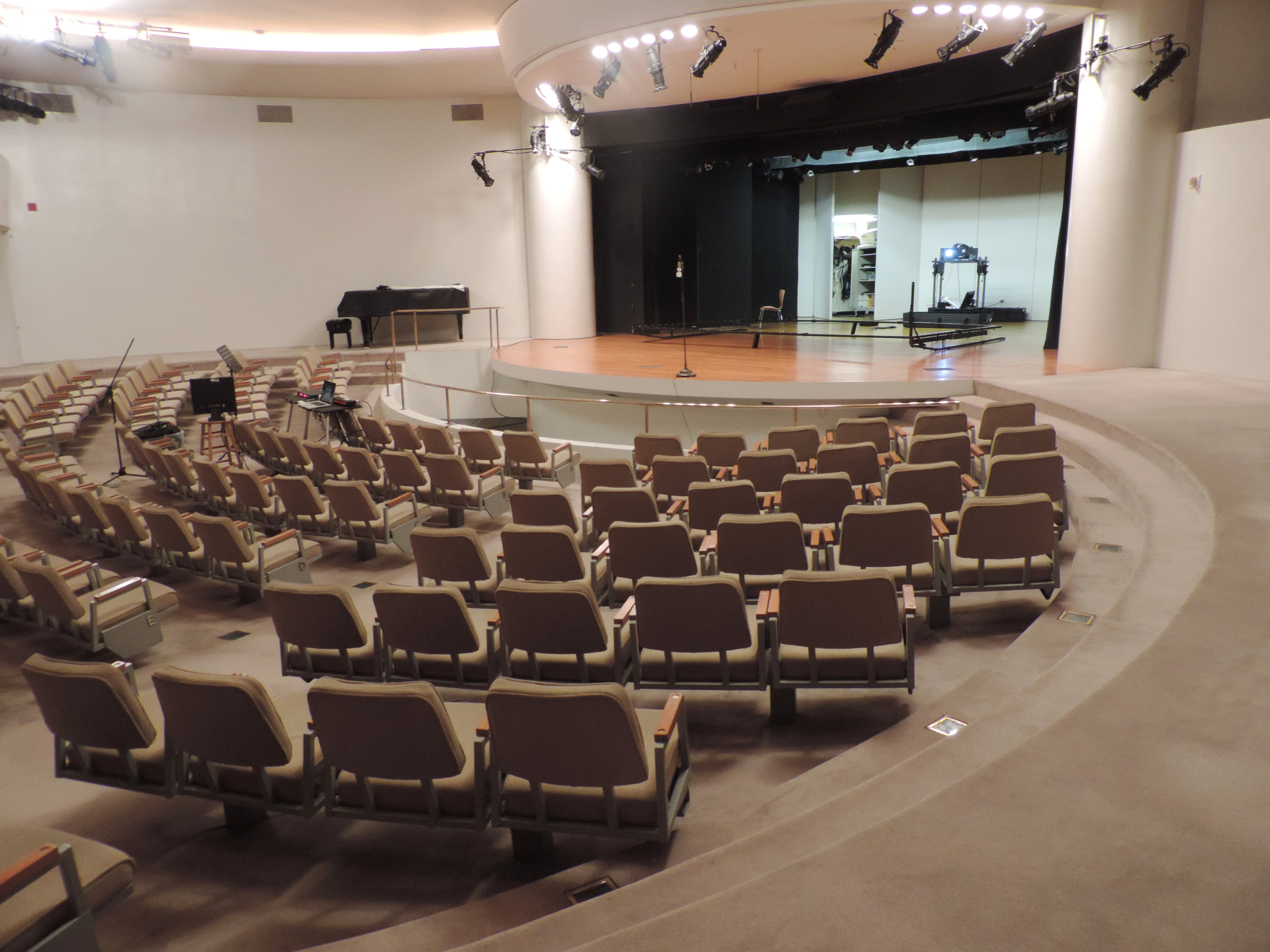
Peter B. Lewis Theater

The Gail May Engelberg Center for Arts Education, completed in 2001, covers 8,200 square feet (760 m^{2}) on the lower level of the museum, below the main gallery. It was a gift of the Mortimer D. Sackler family and was originally named for them. The facility provides classes and lectures about the visual and performing arts and opportunities to interact with the museum's collections and special exhibitions through its labs, exhibition spaces, conference rooms and 266-seat Peter B. Lewis Theater. Following criticism over the Sackler family's involvement in the opioid epidemic in the United States, the center was renamed in 2022 for museum trustee Gail May Engelberg, who along with her husband Alfred Engelberg had donated $15 million to the museum.

The basement space looks out onto a sloped driveway outside the southwest corner of the museum. The Peter B. Lewis Theater is directly beneath the main gallery and contains two levels of seating: an orchestra level and a balcony. There is a coatroom at the balcony level, separated from the balcony seats by a metal partition. The southeast corner of the orchestra level contains a raised wooden stage. The theater's walls contain embedded piers, as well as semicircular window openings. The plaster ceiling contains recessed cove lighting. When the theater was built, it could be accessed directly from the triangular service core, as well as via the driveway outside the museum.

==== Annex galleries ====
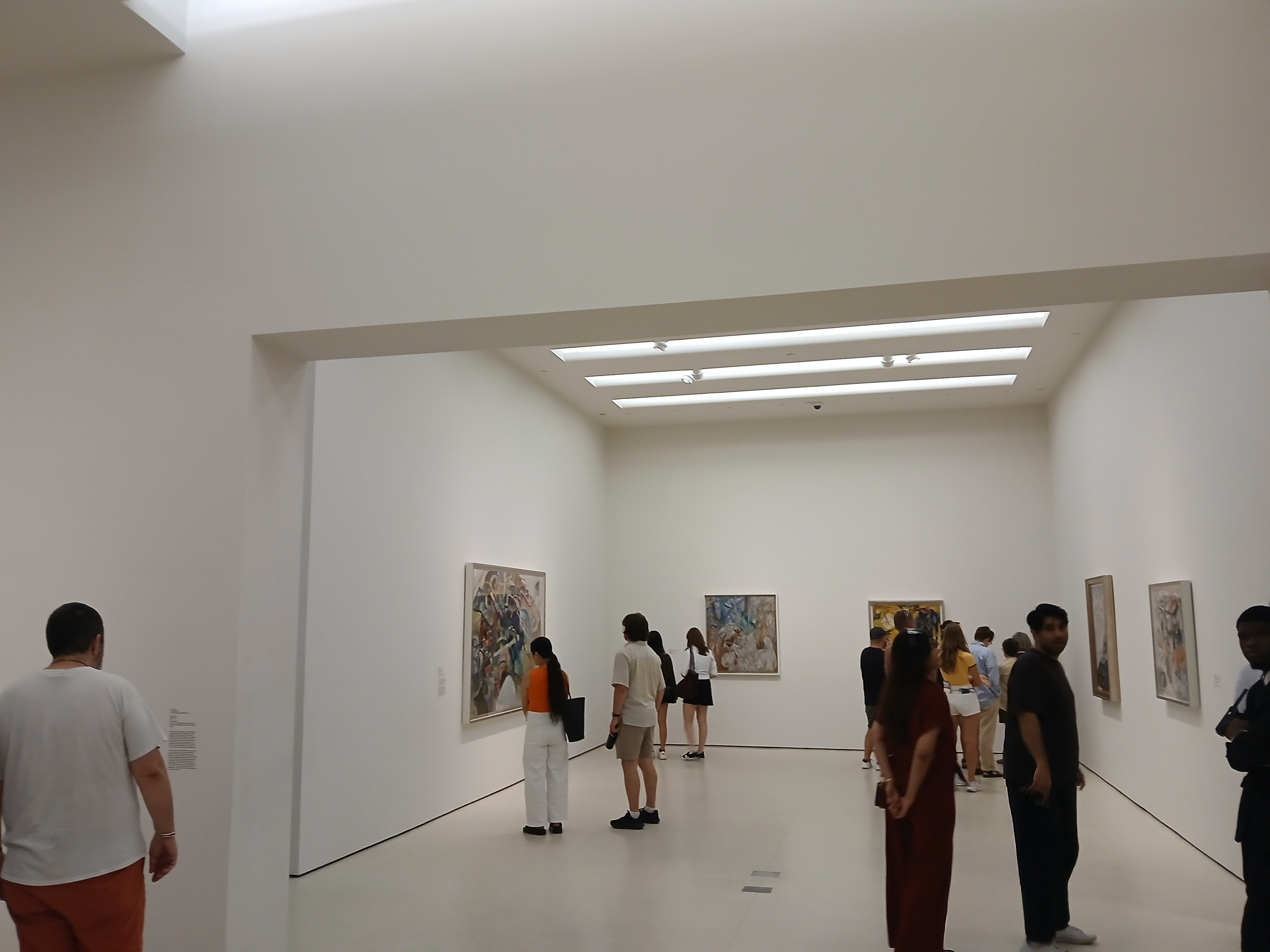
The galleries on the annex's second floor

The 89th Street annex contains 10,290 square feet (956 m^{2}) of additional exhibition space. There are four exhibition galleries with flat walls that are "more appropriate for the display of art". Each of the gallery levels is a double-height space. A loading dock is below the galleries, while two office stories and a mechanical floor are above. A steel-and-glass lobby connects the annex to the monitor's ground level, and ramps and passageways connect with the monitor's three upper stories. The annex is linked to the main gallery's stair tower at the fourth, fifth and seventh stories. It also connects to rooftop terraces above the monitor and main gallery.

=== Landmark designations ===
The New York City Landmarks Preservation Commission (LPC) designated the museum building and its interior as New York City landmarks on August 14, 1990, two years after opponents of the annex's construction had asked the commission to consider such a designation. At the time, the Guggenheim was one of the youngest buildings to have city landmark status, having been completed 31 years earlier. When the LPC enlarged its Carnegie Hill Historic District in 1993, the Guggenheim Museum was included in the expanded district.

The museum was added to the National Register of Historic Places (NRHP) on May 19, 2005, and was designated as a National Historic Landmark on October 6, 2008. UNESCO added eight properties, including the Guggenheim, to the World Heritage List in July 2019 under the title "The 20th-Century Architecture of Frank Lloyd Wright".

== Collection ==
The Guggenheim has about 8,000 works in its collection as of 2022. About 1,700 are part of its online collection. The museum building has a relatively small capacity; according to The Wall Street Journal, following the 1992 renovation, the Guggenheim could show "upward of 6%" of its then 5,000-piece collection. Other pieces are kept in the museum's storeroom. In contrast to other visual-art museums, the Guggenheim does not divide its collection into departments. The permanent collection is typically displayed in the side galleries and annexes, while the main gallery is used for special exhibitions.

The Guggenheim shares its collection with the Peggy Guggenheim Collection in Venice, Italy, and Guggenheim Museum Bilbao, Spain. It has also loaned objects to Guggenheim Abu Dhabi for a preview exhibit. After Peggy Guggenheim's death in 1979, the Guggenheim Foundation began to operate the Venice museum, and Guggenheim New York began to exhibit abstract expressionist, cubist and surrealist art from both the Venice and New York museums together.

=== Personal collections ===
The Guggenheim Museum has acquired private collections throughout its history, including those of Guggenheim, Karl Nierendorf, Katherine Sophie Dreier, Thannhauser, Rebay, Giuseppe Panza, Mapplethorpe and the Bohen Foundation. Its earliest works include modernists such as Rudolf Bauer, Rebay, Kandinsky, Piet Mondrian, Marc Chagall, Robert Delaunay, Fernand Léger, Amedeo Modigliani and Pablo Picasso. Parts of the original collection have been sold over the years. In 2007, 620 of the original works were designated part of the Solomon R. Guggenheim Founding Collection, with works by over 60 artists, including more than 150 by Kandinsky. The founding collection contains several pieces by Albert Gleizes, including Brooklyn Bridge, Composition for "Jazz" and Portrait of an Army Doctor. Pieces such as Chagall's Green Violinist, Franz Marc's Yellow Cow, Jean Metzinger's Woman with a Fan, and Picasso's The Accordionist are also part of the founding collection.

In 1948, the Museum of Non-Objective Art acquired Nierendorf's 730 objects, notably German expressionist paintings. The Guggenheim still had 121 works from the Nierendorf collection in the 1990s, comprising a broad spectrum of expressionist and surrealist works, including paintings by Paul Klee, Oskar Kokoschka and Joan Miró. In 1953, the Guggenheim acquired 28 pieces from Dreier's collection, (Note: Dreier was one of Rebay's colleagues and a founder of modern-art organization Société Anonyme.) including works by Alexander Archipenko, Constantin Brâncuși, Alexander Calder, Marcel Duchamp, Juan Gris, El Lissitzky, Mondrian and Kurt Schwitters.

The Thannhauser Collection, acquired in 1963, initially consisted of 73 works, largely in the Impressionist, Post-Impressionist and French modern styles, including pieces by Paul Gauguin, Édouard Manet, Camille Pissarro, Vincent van Gogh and 32 works by Picasso. Justin Thannhauser's widow Hilde donated additional pieces to the Thannhauser Collection in 1981 and 1991, including Manet's Portrait of Countess Albazzi.

Rebay also bequeathed a portion of her personal collection to the foundation, including works by Kandinsky, Klee, Calder, Gleizes, Mondrian and Schwitters. The Guggenheim received the pieces in 1971, four years after her death, because of a prolonged lawsuit. In 1990 the museum acquired the collection of Giovanna and Giuseppe Panza. This includes examples of minimalist sculptures by Carl Andre, Dan Flavin and Donald Judd; minimalist paintings by Robert Mangold, Brice Marden and Robert Ryman; and an array of postminimal, conceptual and perceptual art by Robert Morris, Richard Serra, James Turrell, Lawrence Weiner and others, notably American examples of the 1960s and 1970s. When the Panza Collection was acquired, some of the pieces had not been sculpted, existing only as sketches.

In 1992, the Robert Mapplethorpe Foundation gave 200 of Mapplethorpe's best photographs to the foundation, marking the museum's first major acquisition of 20th-century photography. The works spanned his entire output, from his early collages, Polaroids, portraits of celebrities, self-portraits, male and female nudes, flowers and statues; it also featured mixed-media constructions and included his well-known 1998 Self-Portrait. The acquisition initiated the foundation's photography exhibition program. In 2001, the foundation received a gift of the collection of the Bohen Foundation, which, for two decades, commissioned new works of art with an emphasis on film, video, photography and new media. It comprises around 275 works by 45 artists, including Pierre Huyghe and Sophie Calle. In 2022, the Guggenheim and the Museum of Contemporary Art, Chicago, jointly received 100 works from the D. Daskalopoulos Collection.

=== Other notable works ===
Under Sweeney's tenure, in the 1950s, the Guggenheim acquired Brâncuși's Adam and Eve (1921) and works by other modernist sculptors such as Joseph Csaky, Jean Arp, Calder, Alberto Giacometti and David Smith. Sweeney reached beyond the 20th century to acquire Paul Cézanne's Man with Crossed Arms (c. 1899) and works by David Hayes, Willem de Kooning and Jackson Pollock. The museum also acquired works by such artists as Aristide Maillol, Jean Messagier, Fritz Hundertwasser and Eduardo Paolozzi, several Giacometti drawings and sculptures, a cubist drawing by Picasso and some Henri-Georges Adam engravings. In the 1960s, among Messer's acquisitions were Francis Bacon's triptych Three Studies for a Crucifixion and David Smith's sculpture Cubi XXVII. and pieces by Brâncuși, Calder, Giacometti, Klee, Léger, Joan Miró, Egon Schiele and František Kupka.

Originally, the Guggenheim Museum's collection did not include any figurative art because of the museum's focus on "non-objective painting", but it later expanded to include a range of figurative pieces, such as a portrait of art critic Felix Feneon by Édouard Vuillard, Three Studies for a Crucifixion and Miró's painting The Tilled Field. Others include Picasso's Le Moulin de la Galette, Mandolin and Guitar, Woman With Yellow Hair and Woman Ironing; Julian Schnabel's The Student of Prague; Roy Lichtenstein's Grrrrrrrrrrr!! and Kandinsky's Study for Composition II and Blue Mountain.

=== Selected works in the collection ===
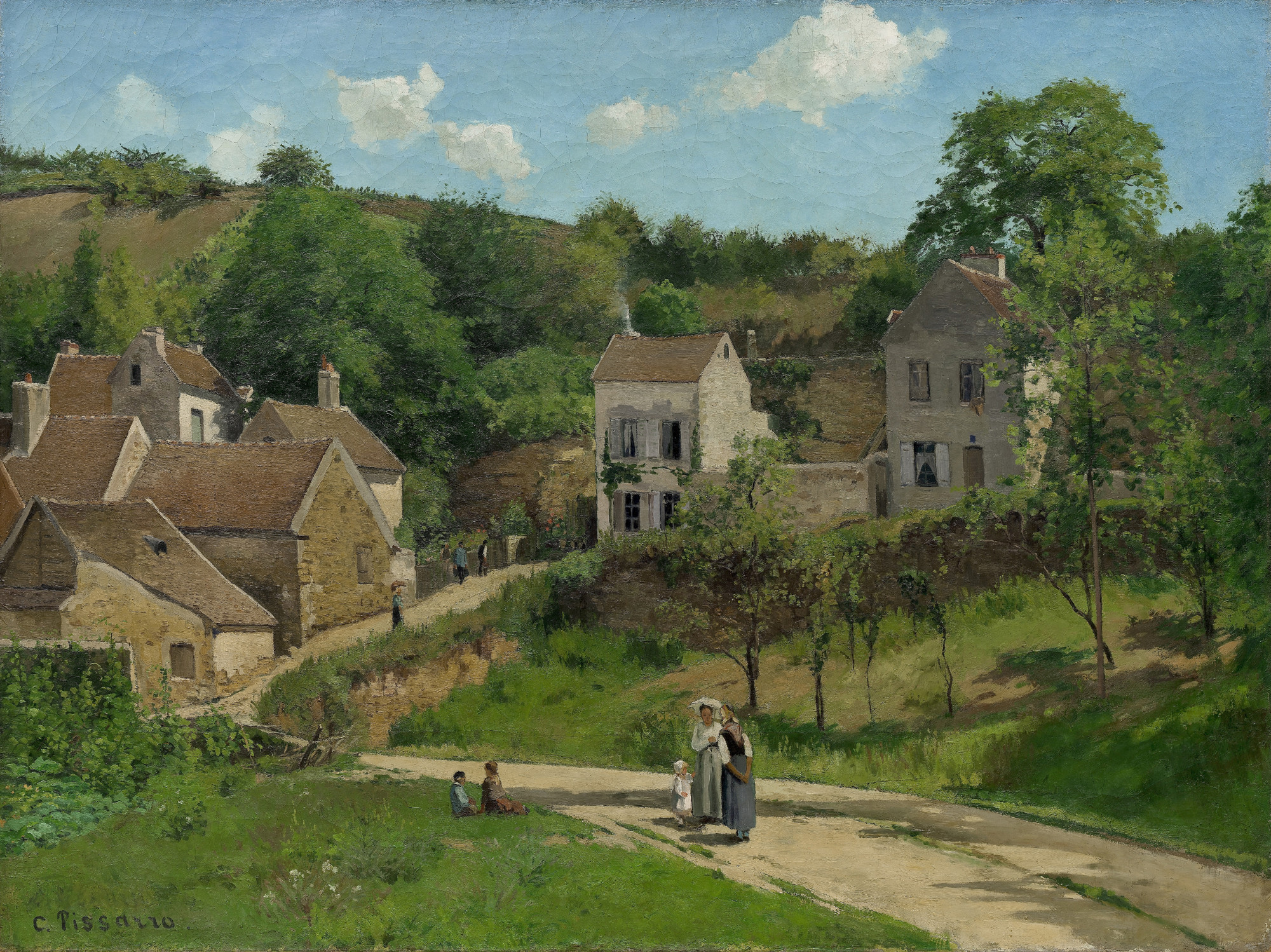
Camille Pissarro L'Hermitage à Pontoise,1867

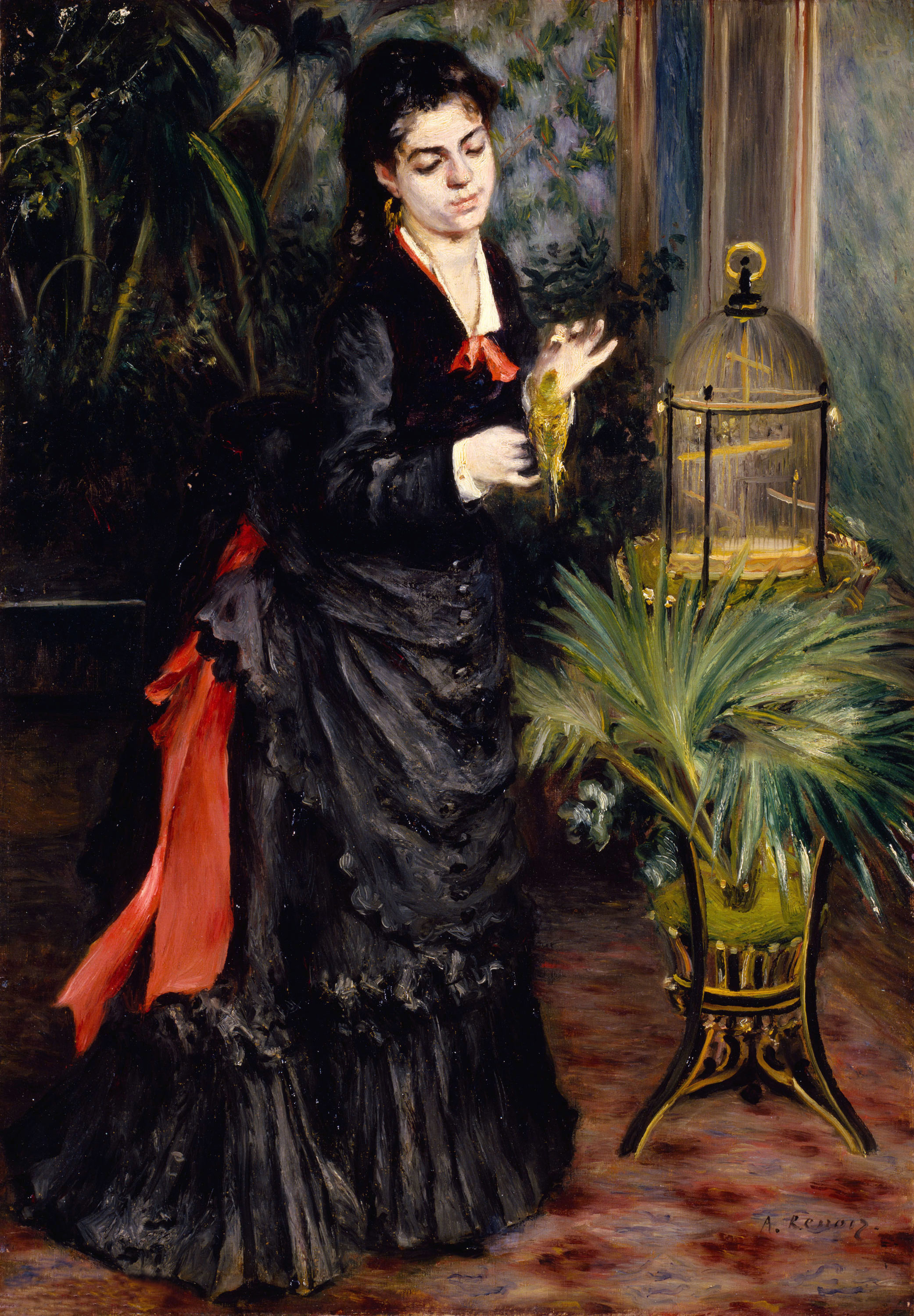
Pierre-Auguste Renoir Woman with a Parrot, 1871

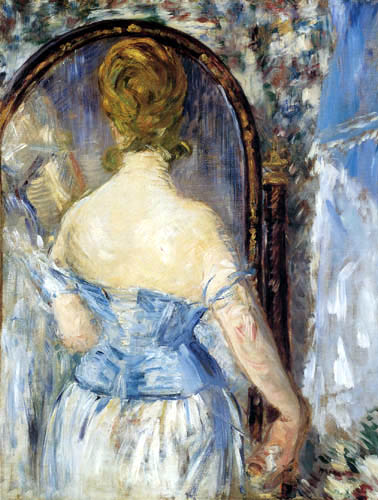
Édouard Manet Before the Mirror, 93 x 71.6 cm, 1876

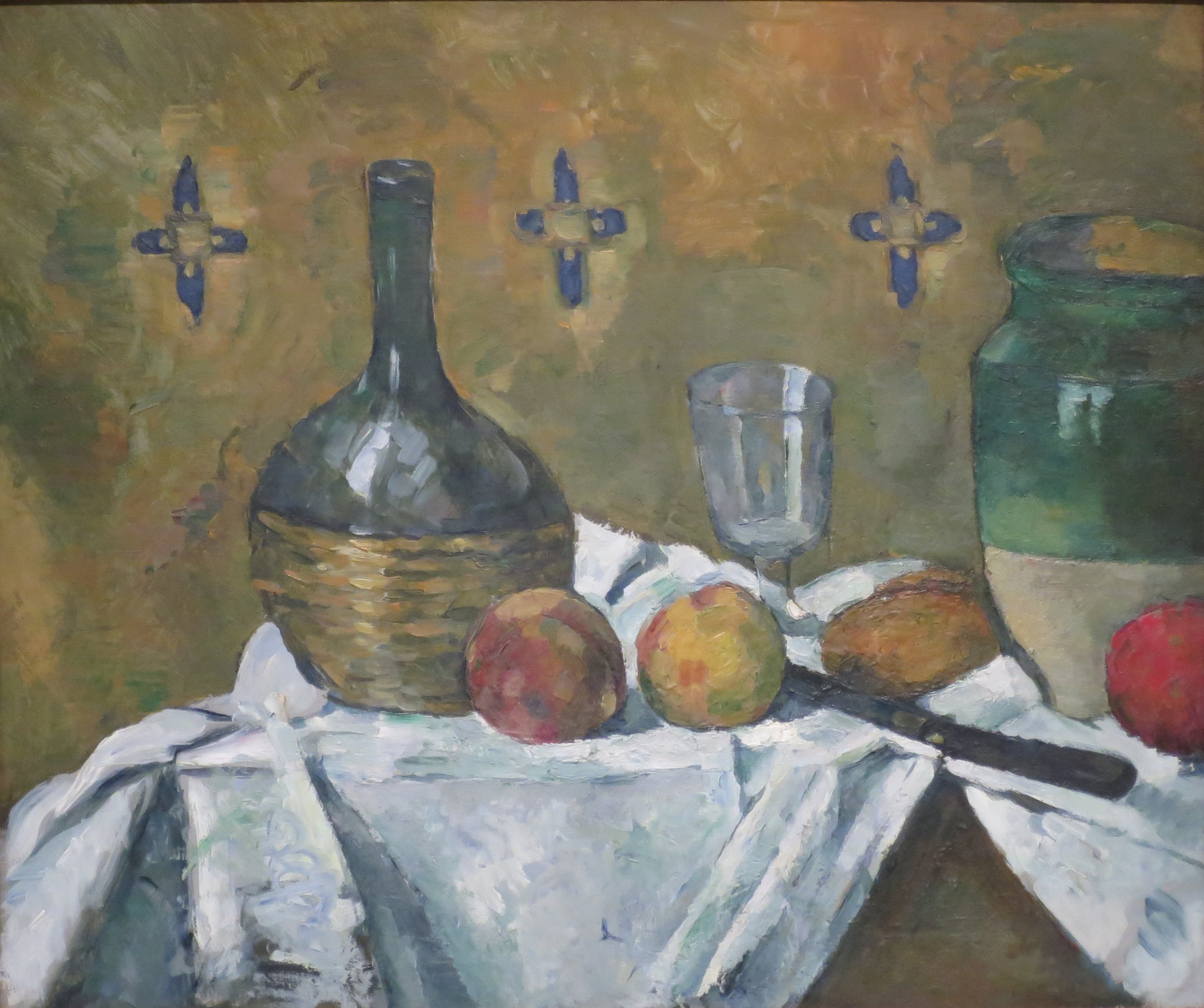
Paul Cézanne Still Life: Flask, Glass, and Jug, 1877

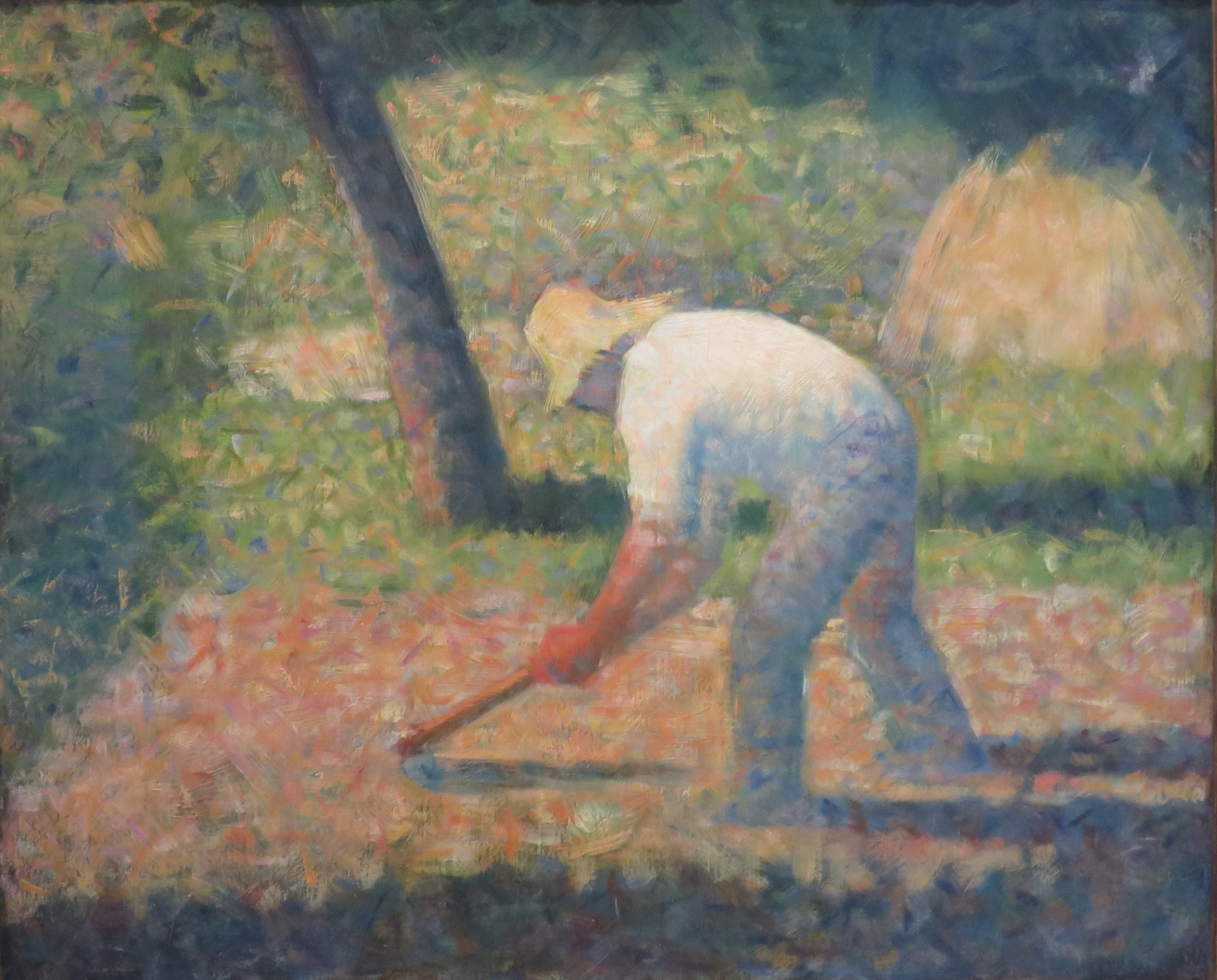
Georges Seurat Peasant with Hoe, 1882

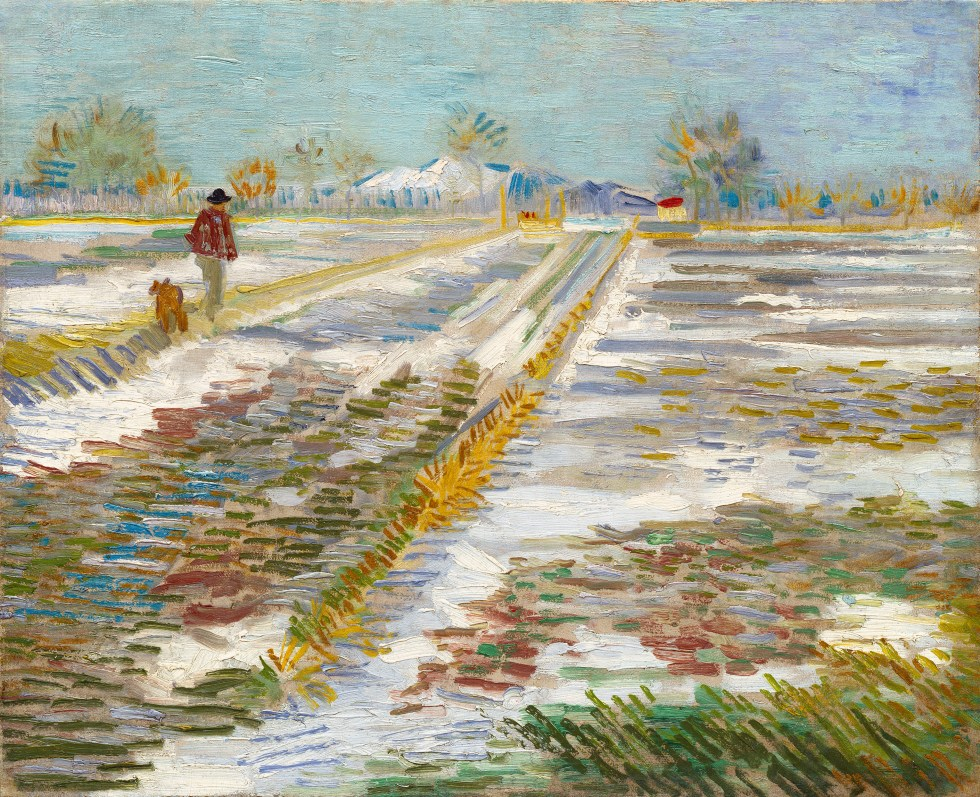
Vincent van Gogh Landscape with Snow, 1888

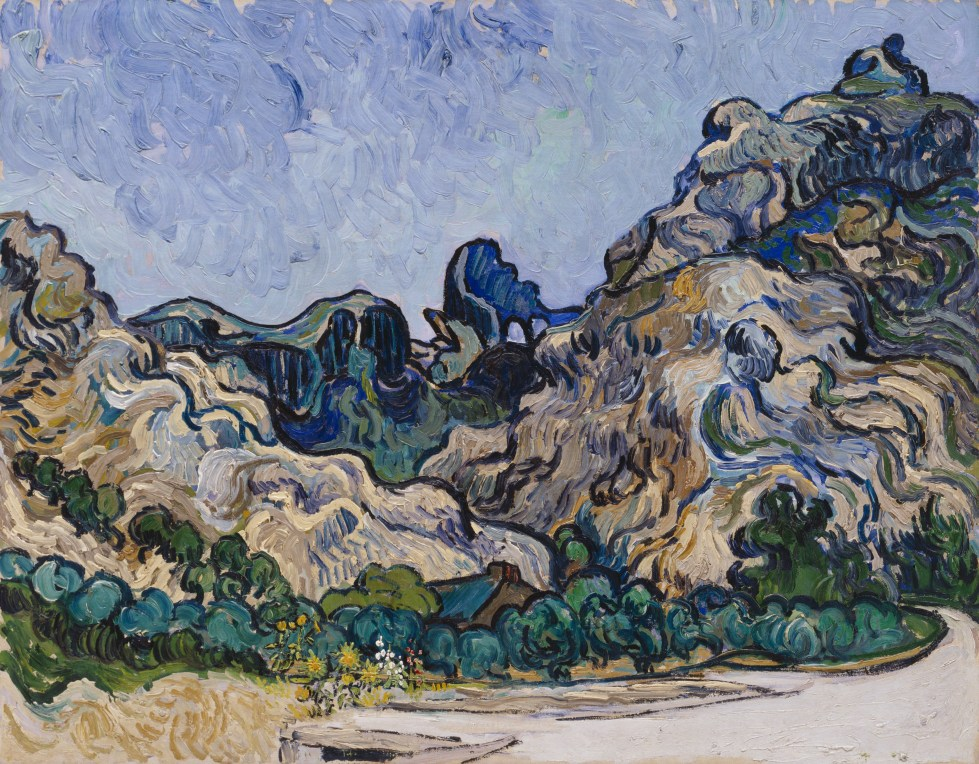
Vincent van Gogh Mountains at Saint-Rémy, 72.8 x 92 cm, 1889

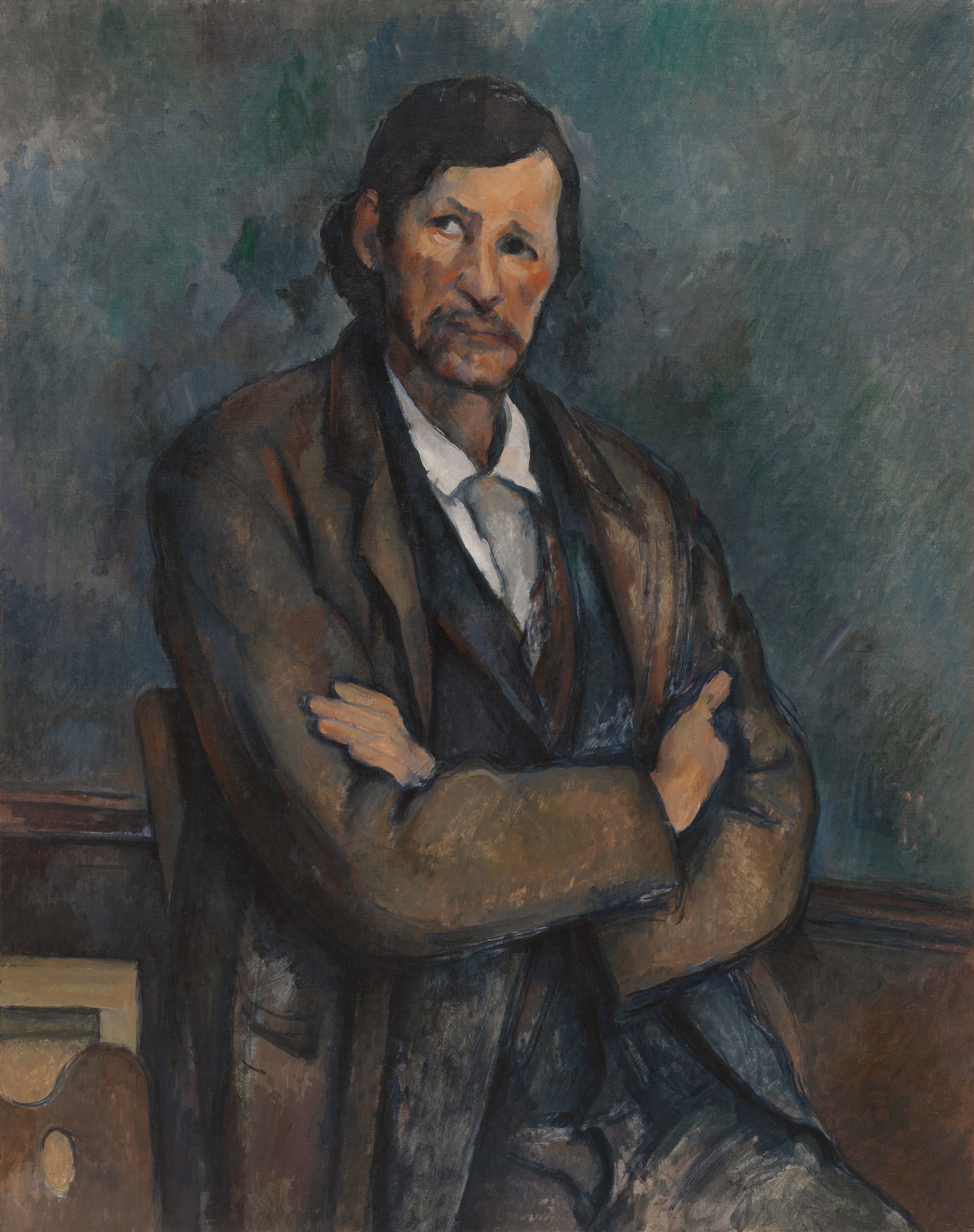
Paul Cézanne, c. 1899, Homme aux bras croisés (Man with Crossed Arms), oil on canvas, 92 × 72.7 cm

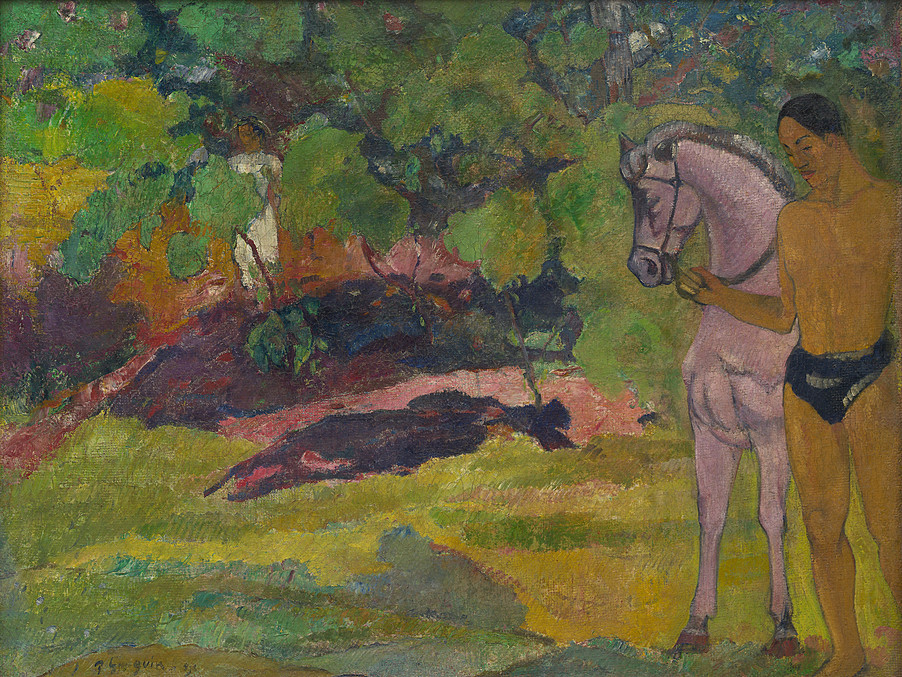
Paul Gauguin In the Vanilla Grove, Man and Horse, 73 x 92 cm, 1891

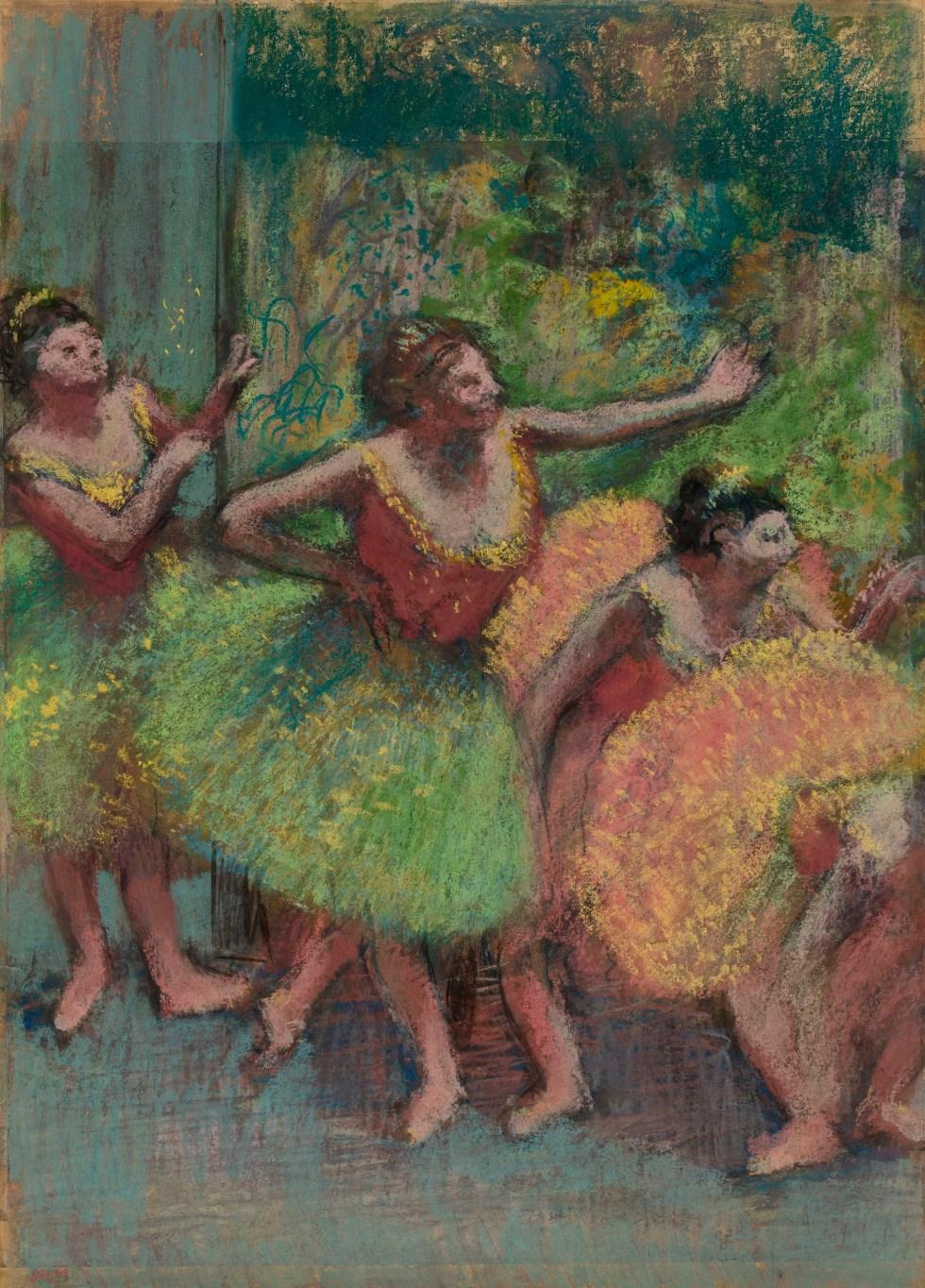
Edgar Degas Dancers in Green and Yellow, 98.8 x 71.5 cm 1903

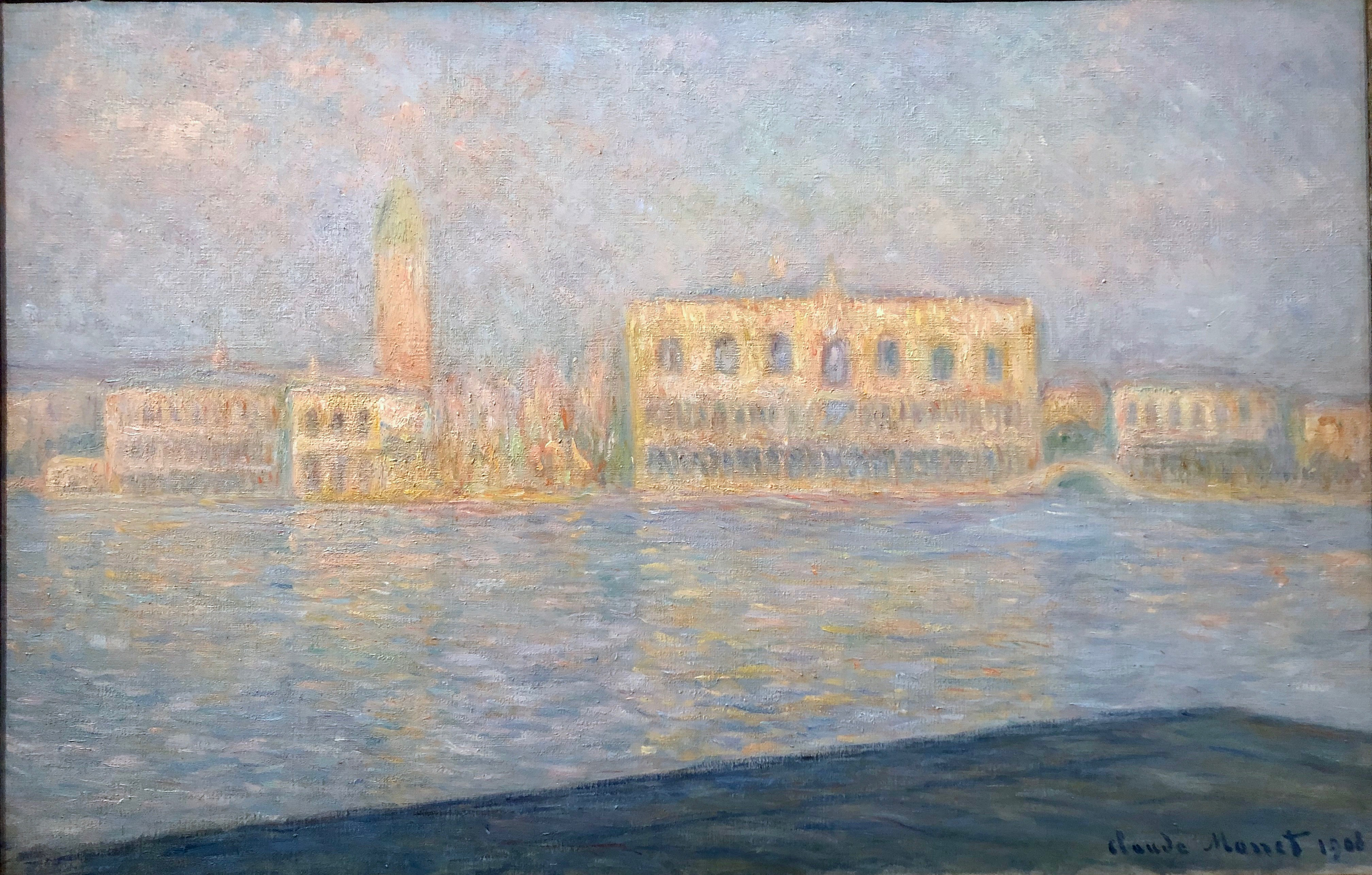
Claude Monet The Palazzo Ducale, Seen from San Giorgio Maggiore, 1908

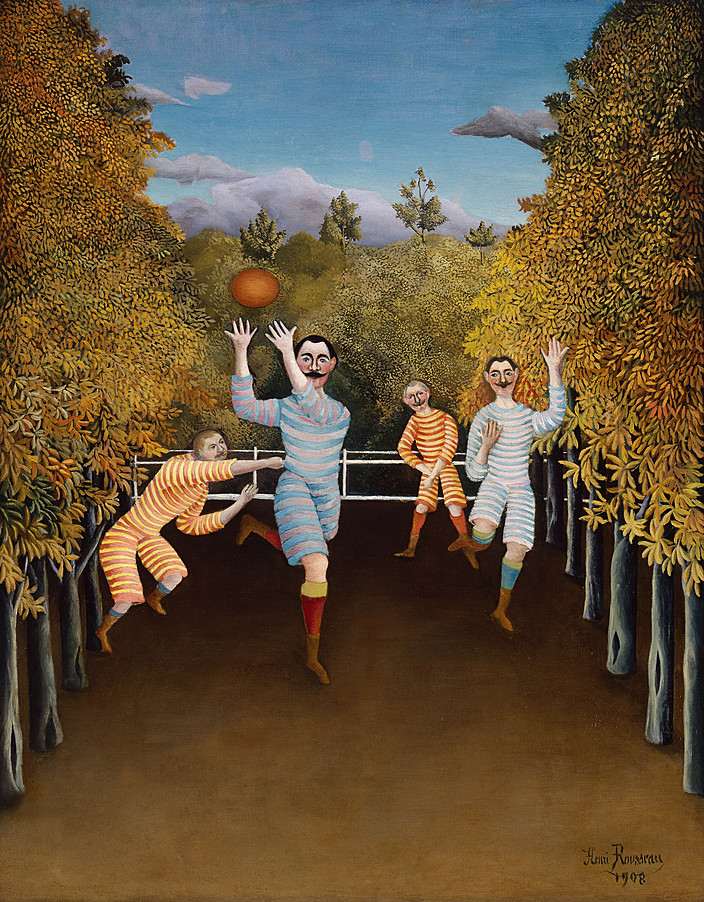
Henri Rousseau The Football Players, 100.3 x 81.1 cm 1908

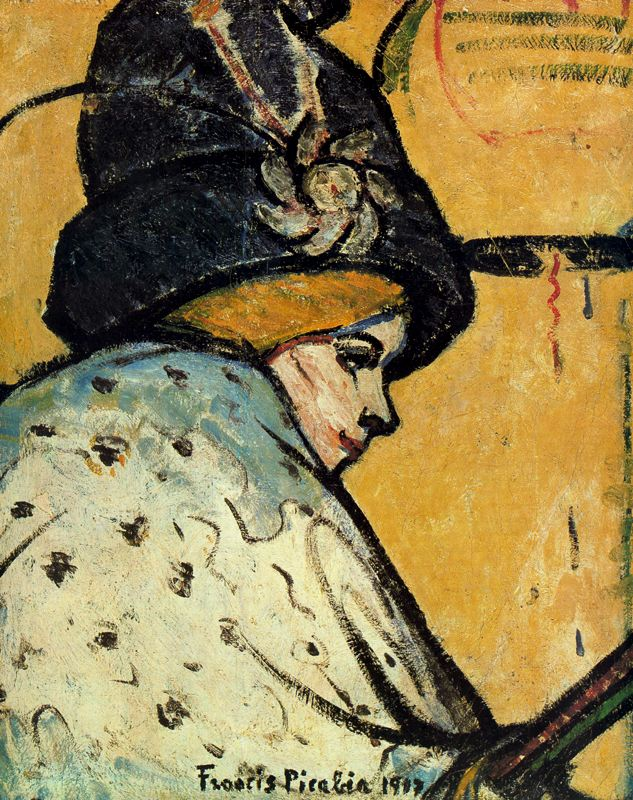
Francis Picabia Portrait of Mistinguett, oil on canvas, 60 x 49.2 cm ca. 1908–11

Georges Braque, 1909, Violin and Palette (Violon et palette, Dans l'atelier), oil on canvas, 91.7 × 42.8 cm

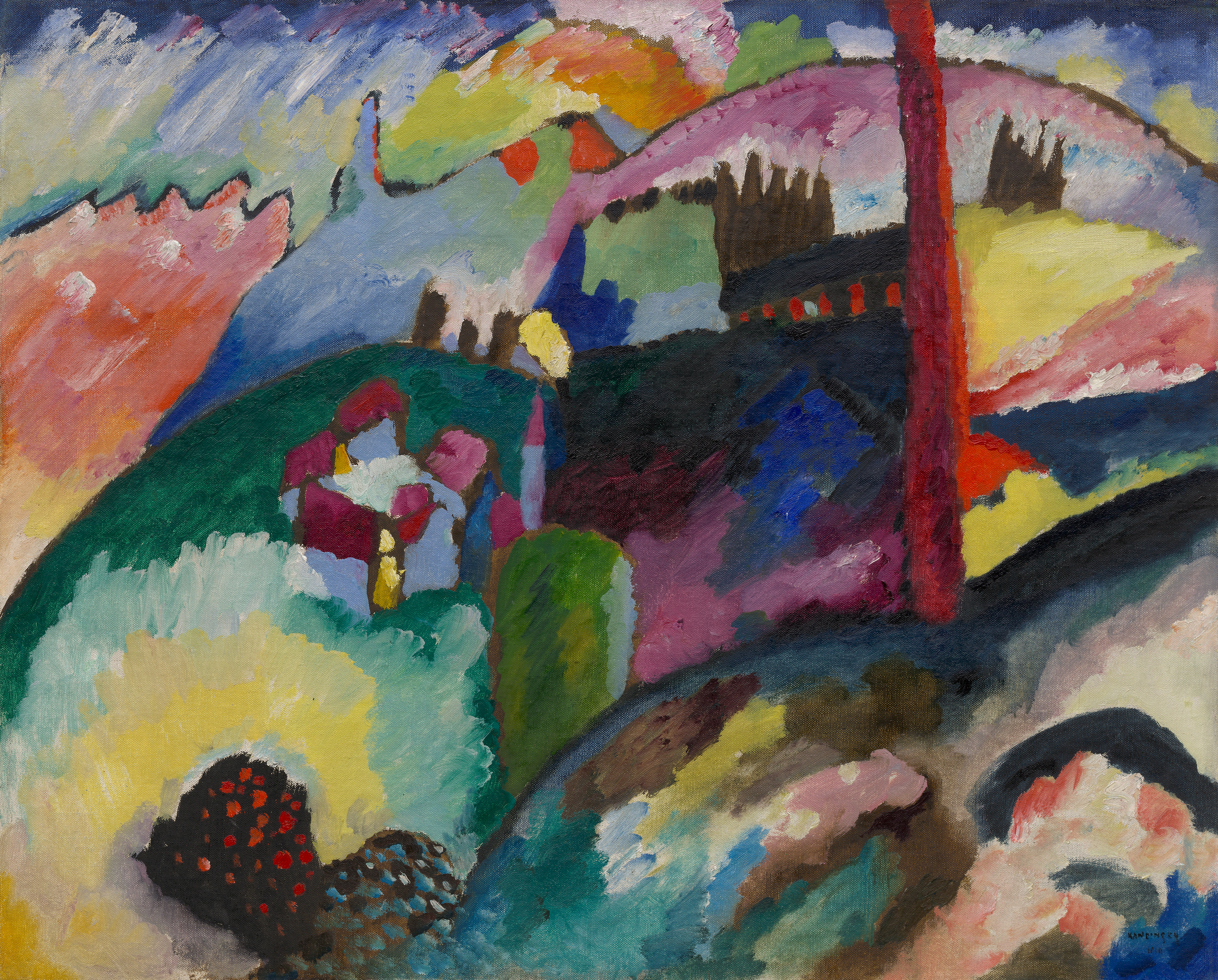
Wassily Kandinsky, 1910, Landscape with Factory Chimney, oil on canvas, 66.2 × 82 cm

Pablo Picasso The Poet, oil on linen, 131.2 × 89.5 cm 1911

Marcel Duchamp Nude (Study), Sad Young Man in a Train, 1911-12 Oil on canvas panel 100 x 73 cm

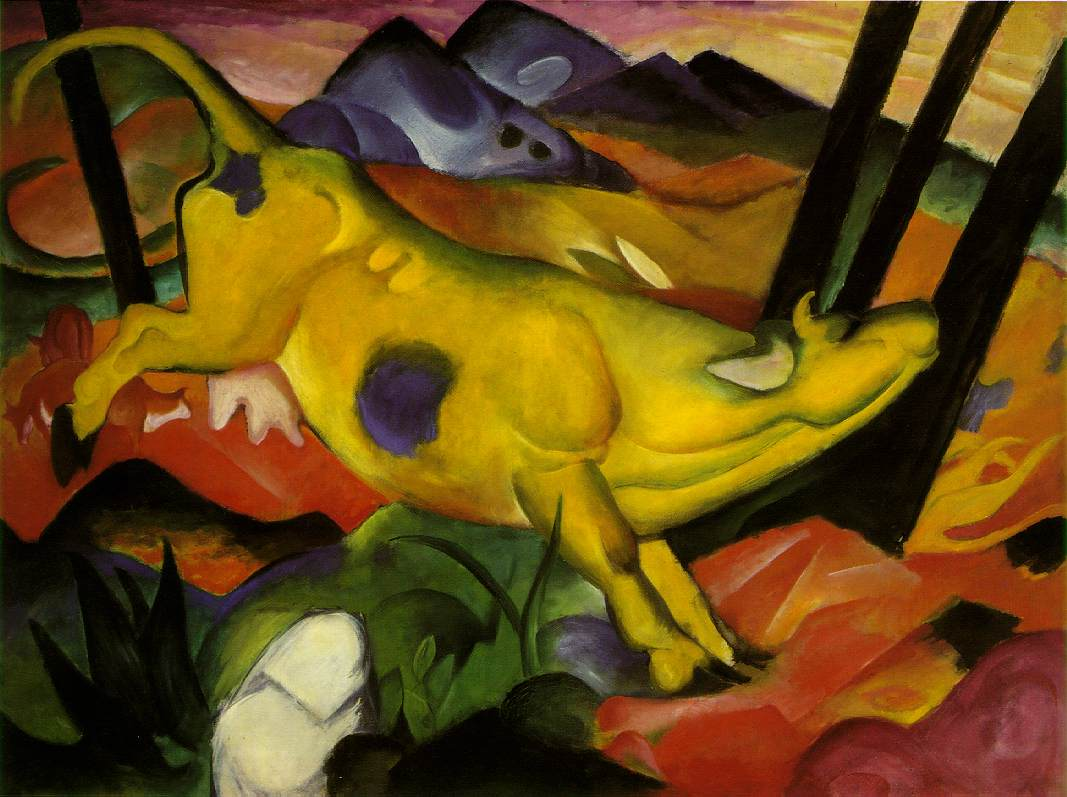
Franz Marc, 1911, The Yellow Cow, oil on canvas, 140.5 × 189.2 cm

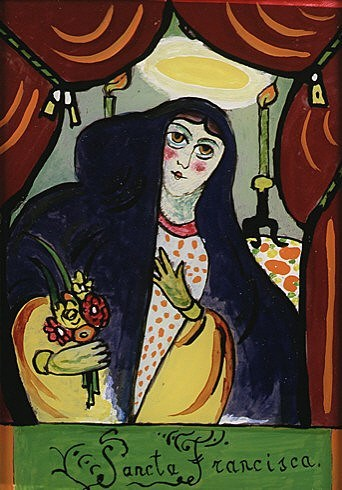
Wassily Kandinsky Sancta Francisca, 1911

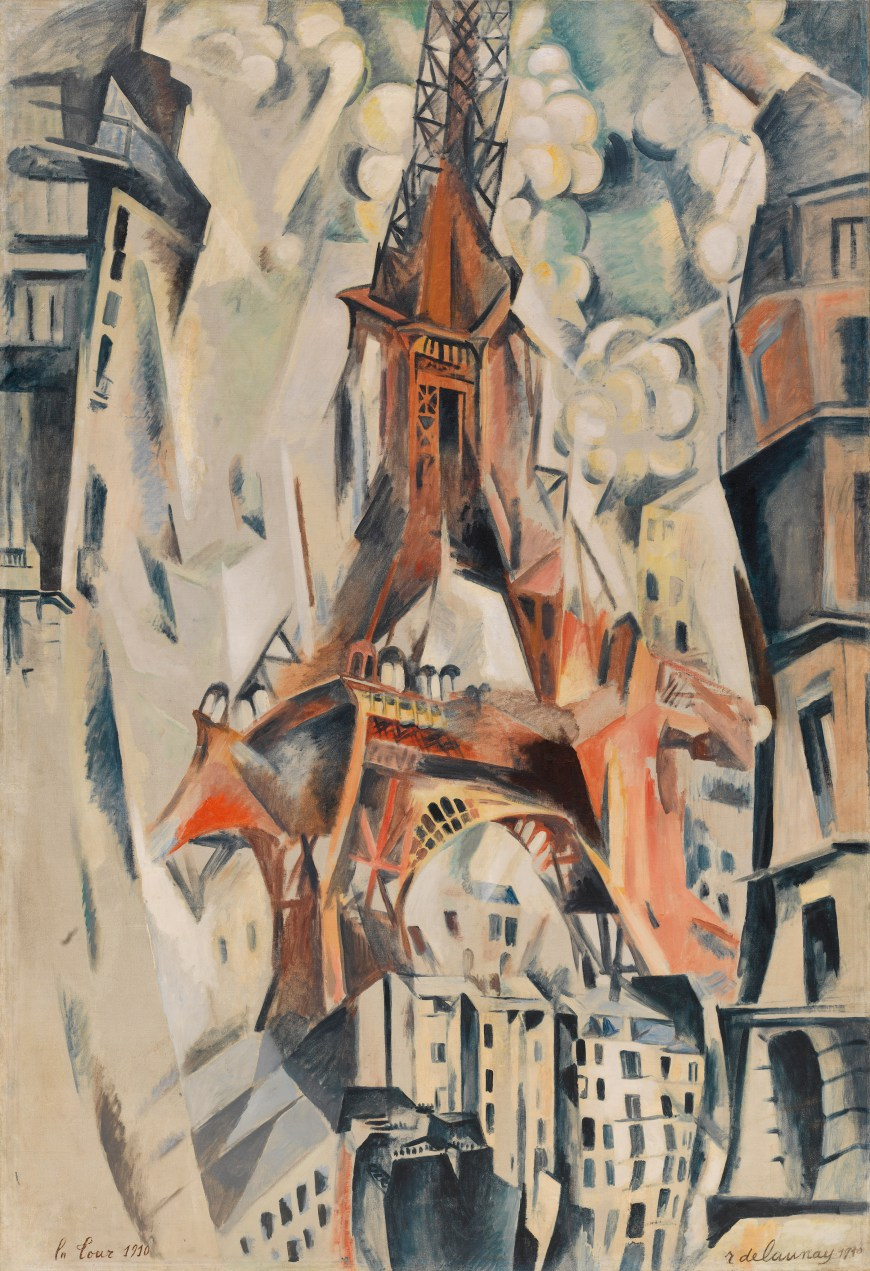
Robert Delaunay Eiffel Tower, 1911

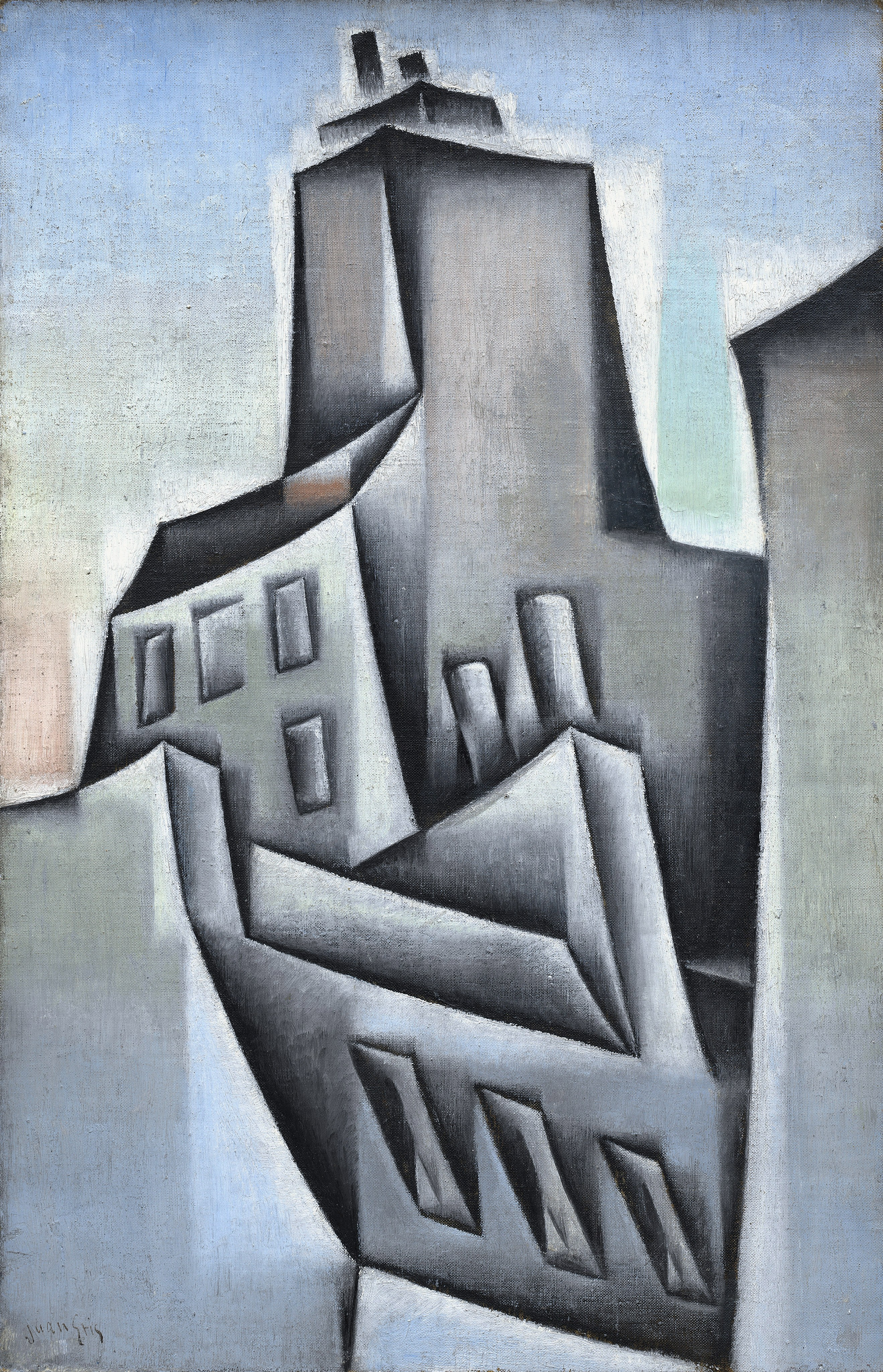
Juan Gris, 1911, Maisons à Paris (Houses in Paris), 1911, oil on canvas, 52.4 × 34.2 cm

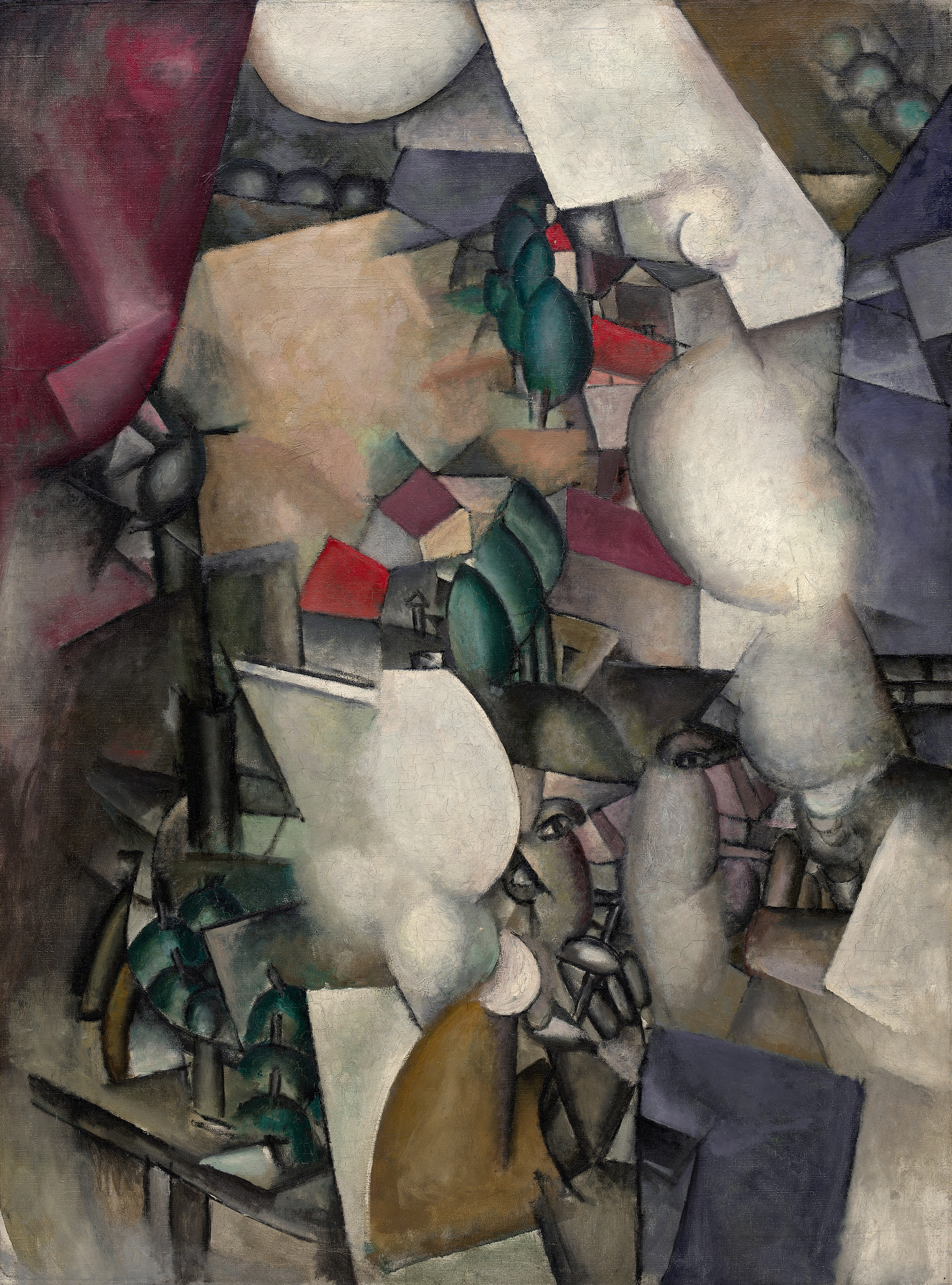
Fernand Léger, 1911–12, Les Fumeurs (The Smokers), oil on canvas, 129.2 × 96.5 cm

Jean Metzinger, 1912, Femme à l'Éventail (Woman with a Fan), oil on canvas, 90.7 × 64.2 cm

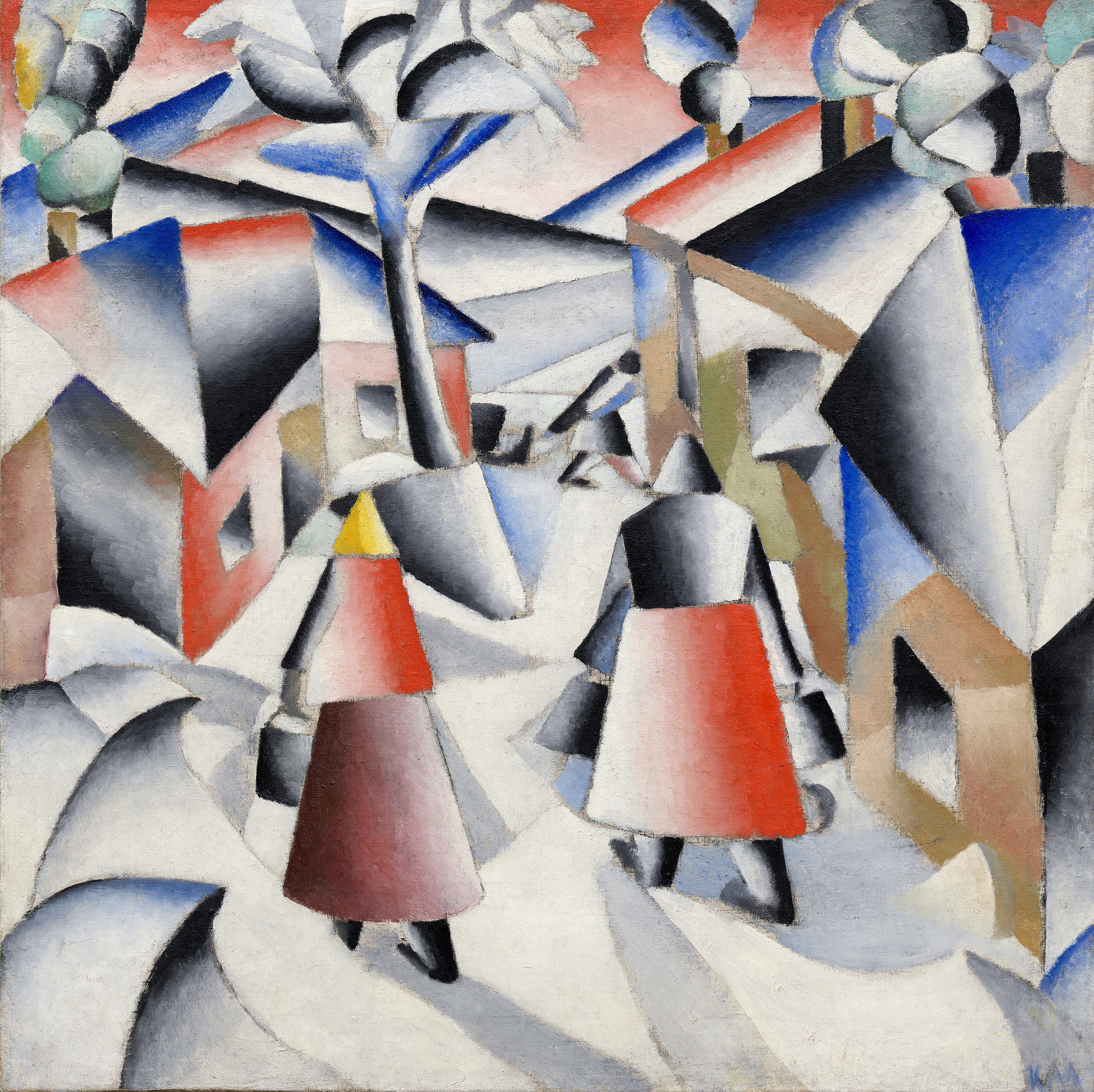
Kazimir Malevich Morning in the Village after Snowstorm, 1912

Marc Chagall, 1913, Paris par la fenêtre (Paris Through the Window), oil on canvas, 136 × 141.9 cm

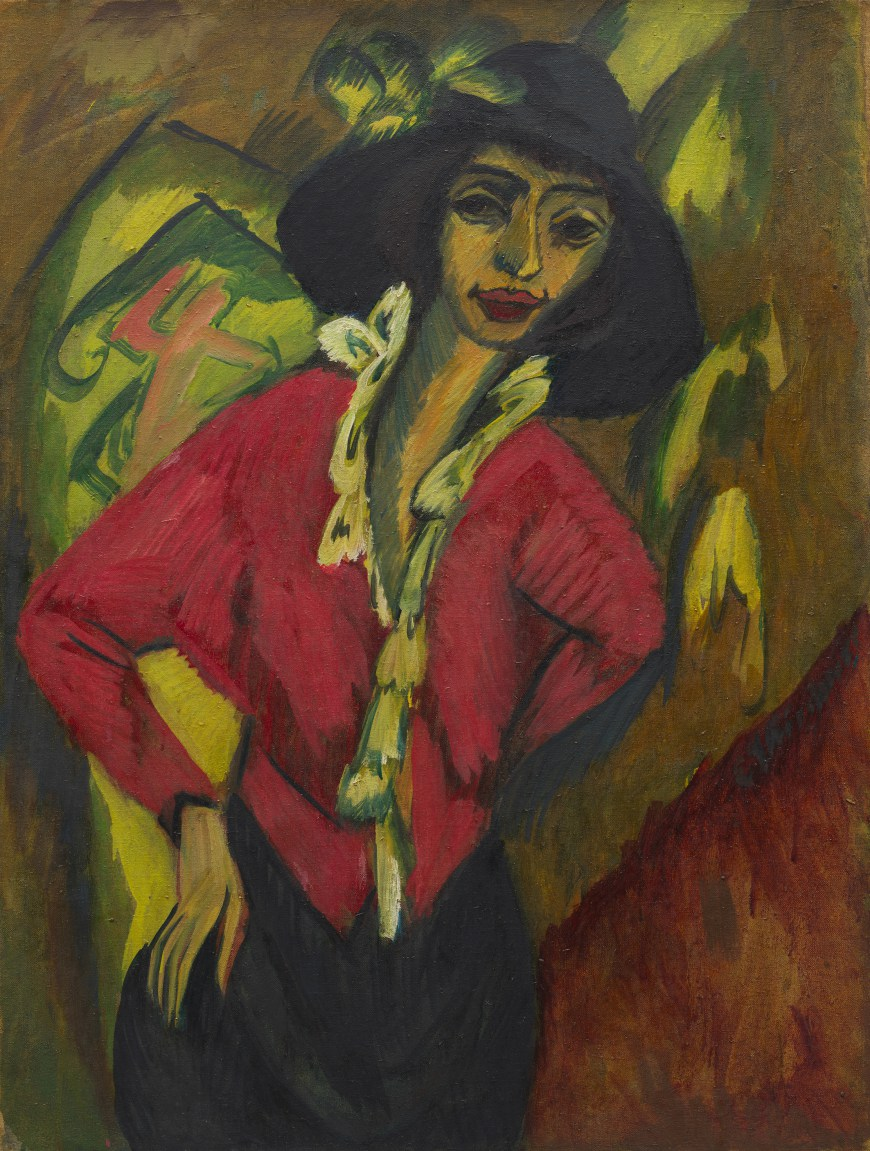
Ernst Ludwig Kirchner Gerda, Half-Length Portrait, 99.1 x 75.3 cm. 1914

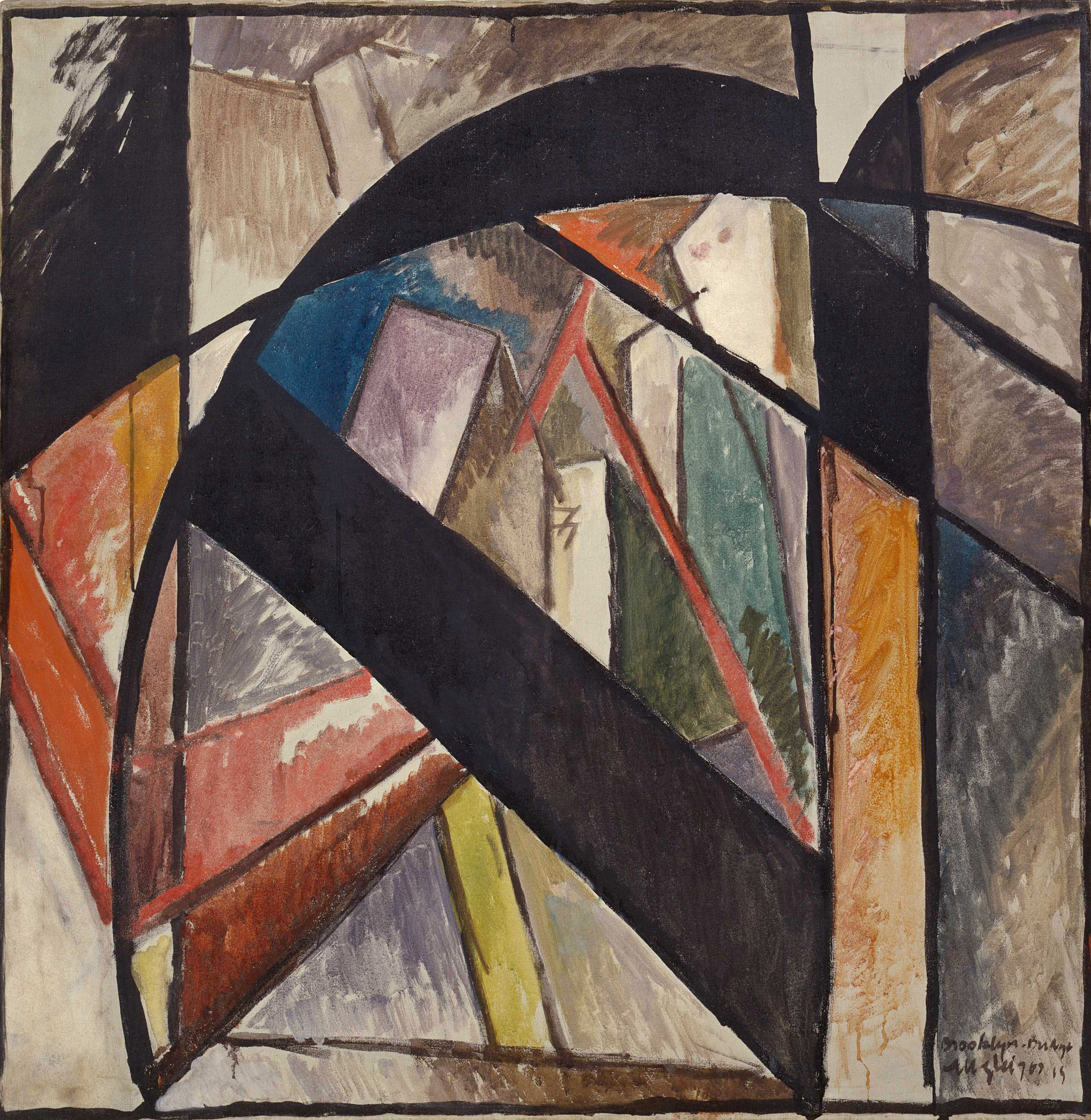
Albert Gleizes, Brooklyn Bridge (Pont de Brooklyn), oil and gouache on canvas, 102 × 102 cm cm 1915

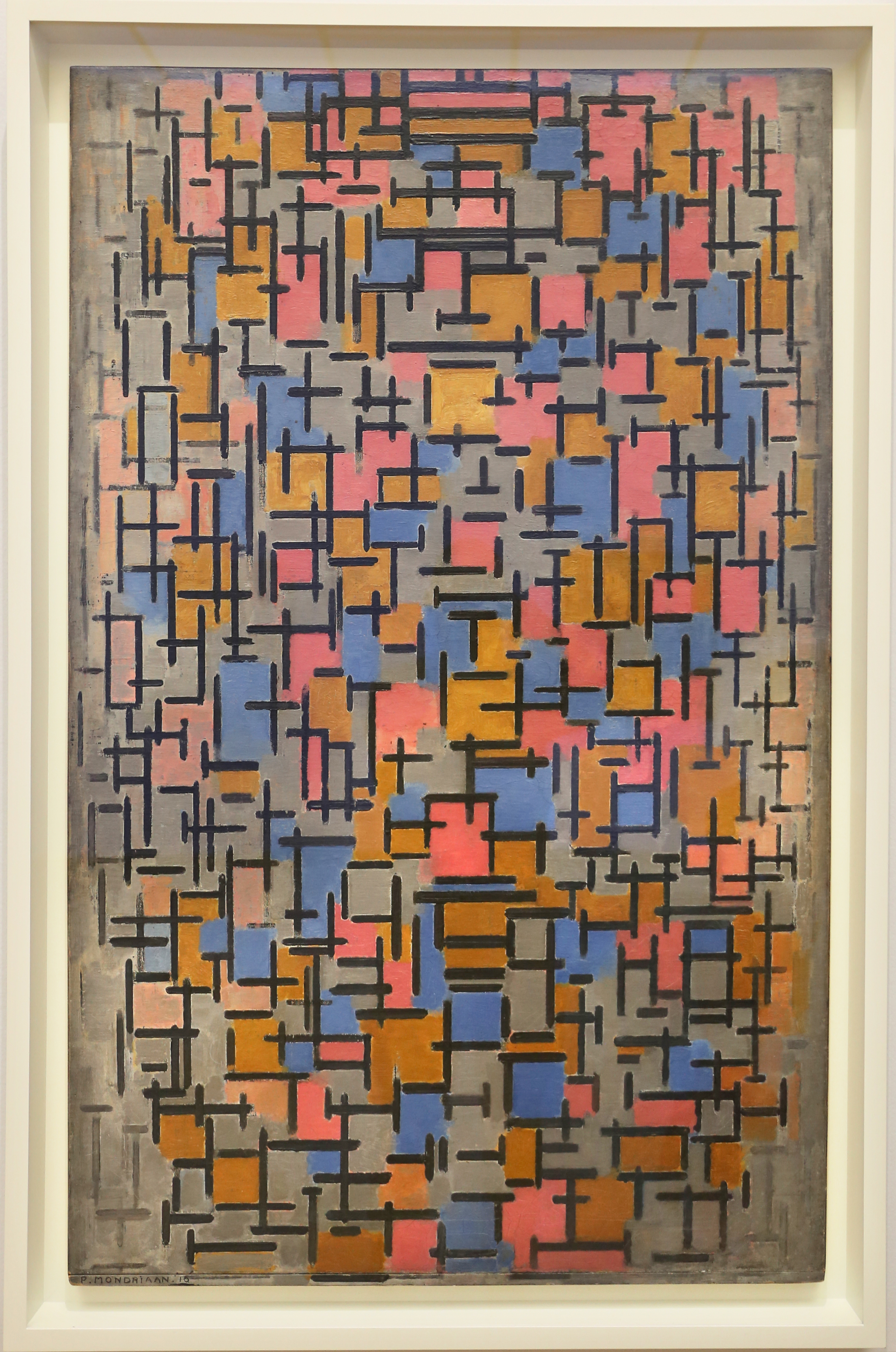
Piet Mondrian Composition, 1916

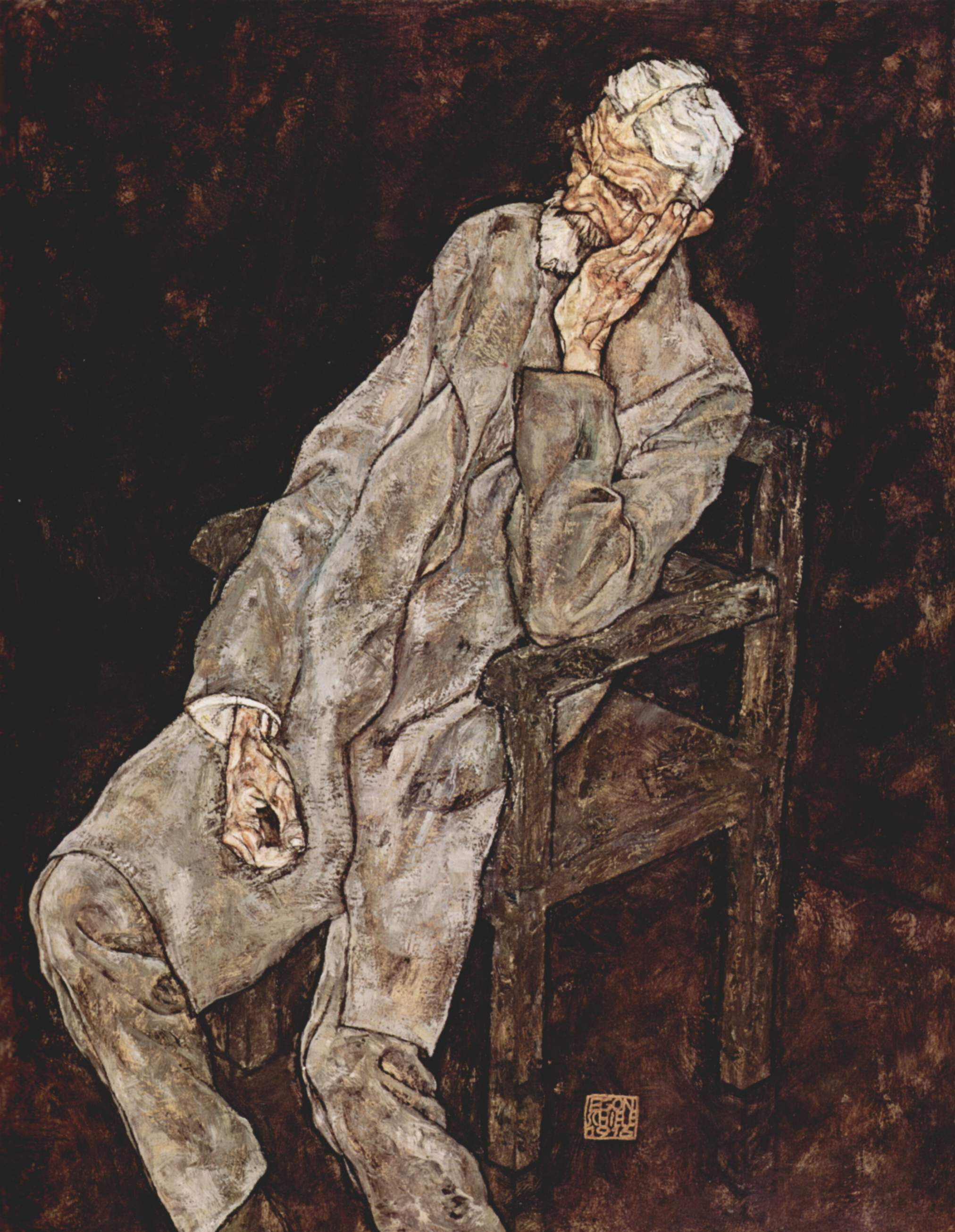
Egon Schiele Portrait of an Old Man, oil with wax and charcoal on canvas, 141 x 110.8 cm 1916

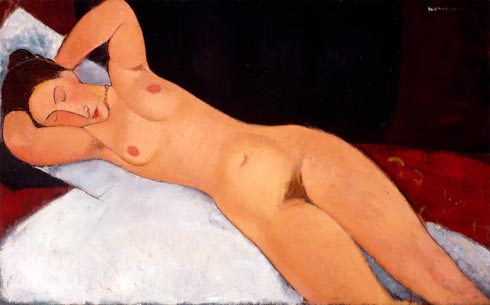
Amedeo Modigliani, Nude (Nu), oil on canvas, 73 × 116.7 cm 1917

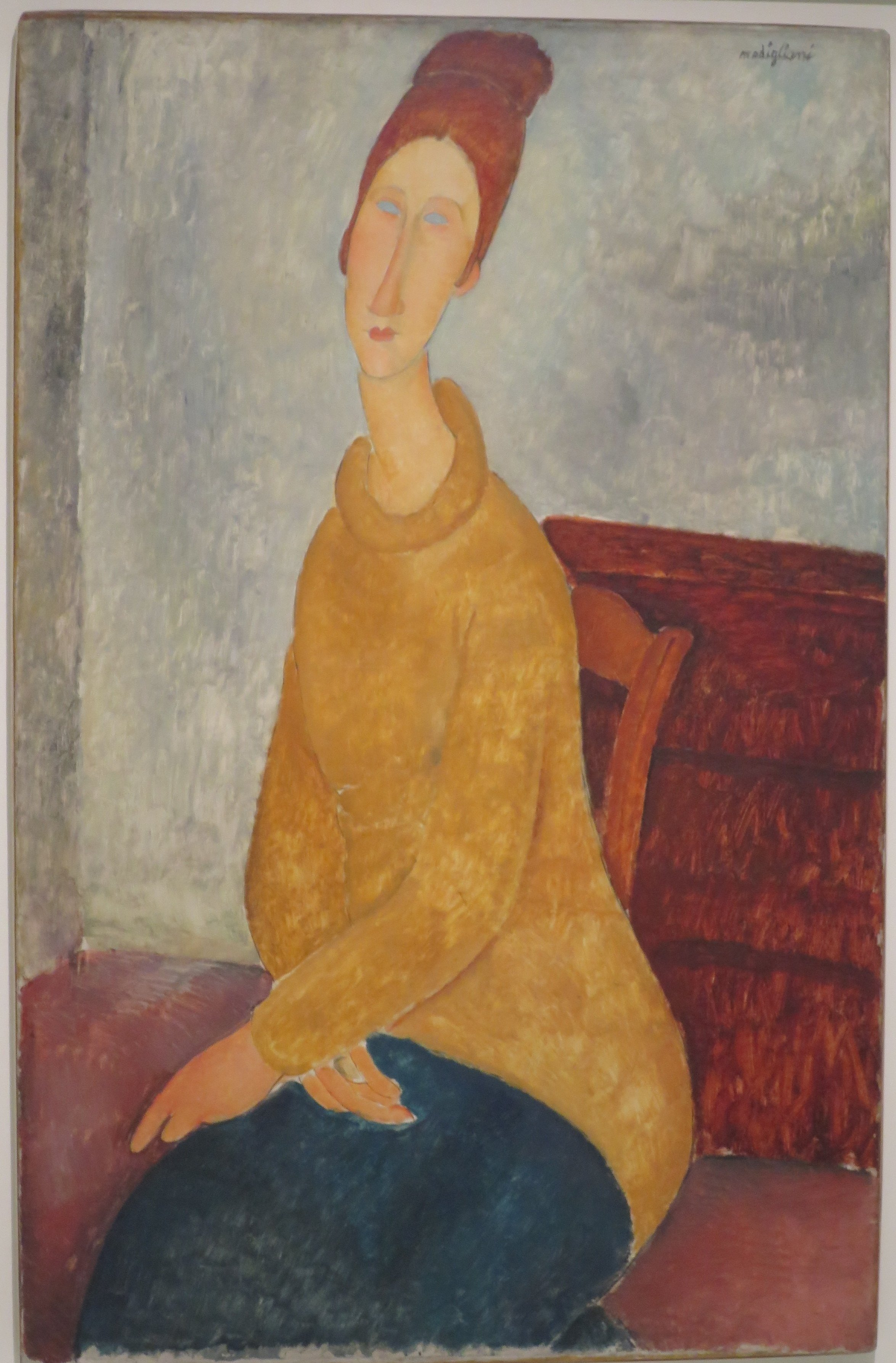
Amedeo Modigliani Le Sweater jaune, 1918

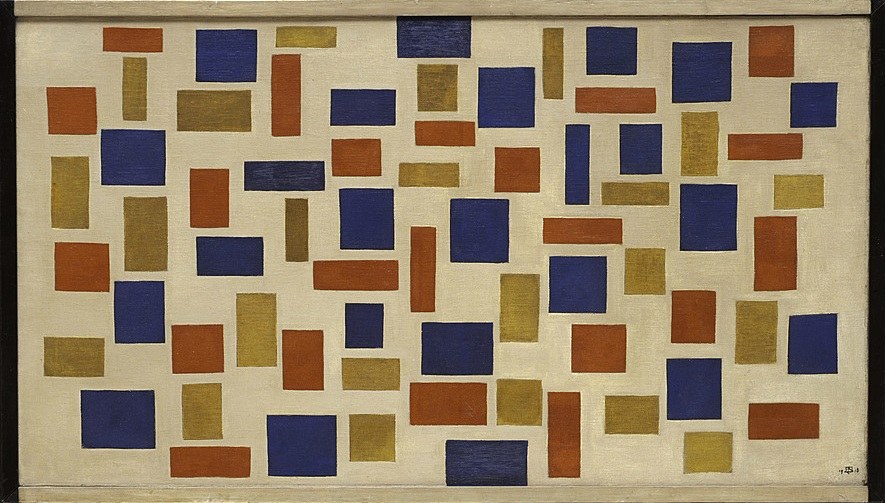
Theo van Doesburg, Composition XI, oil on canvas, 57 × 101 cm 1918

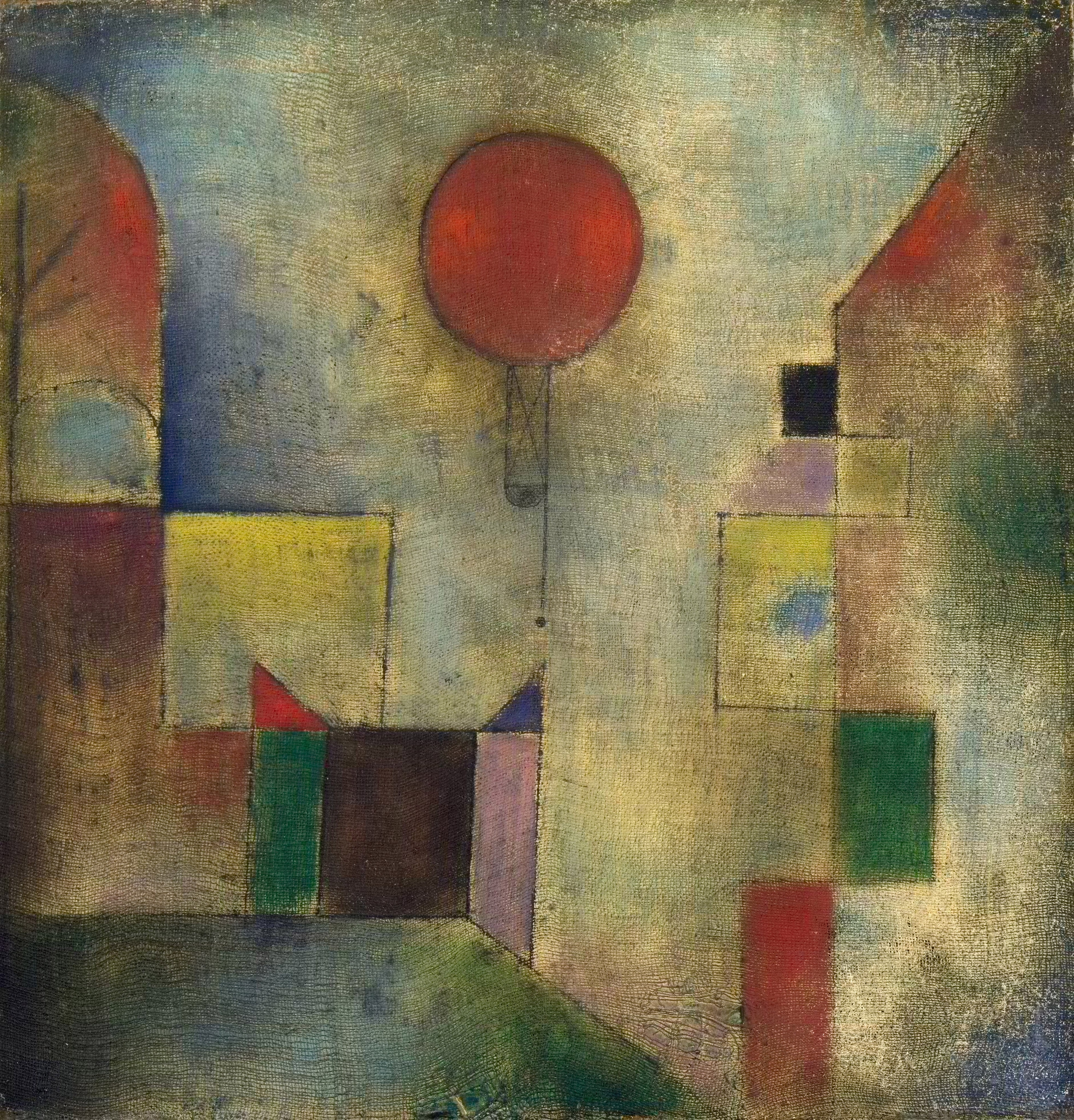
Paul Klee, Red Balloon (Roter Ballon), oil on chalk-primed gauze, mounted on board, 31.7 × 31.1 cm 1922

Joan Miró The Tilled Field, 1924

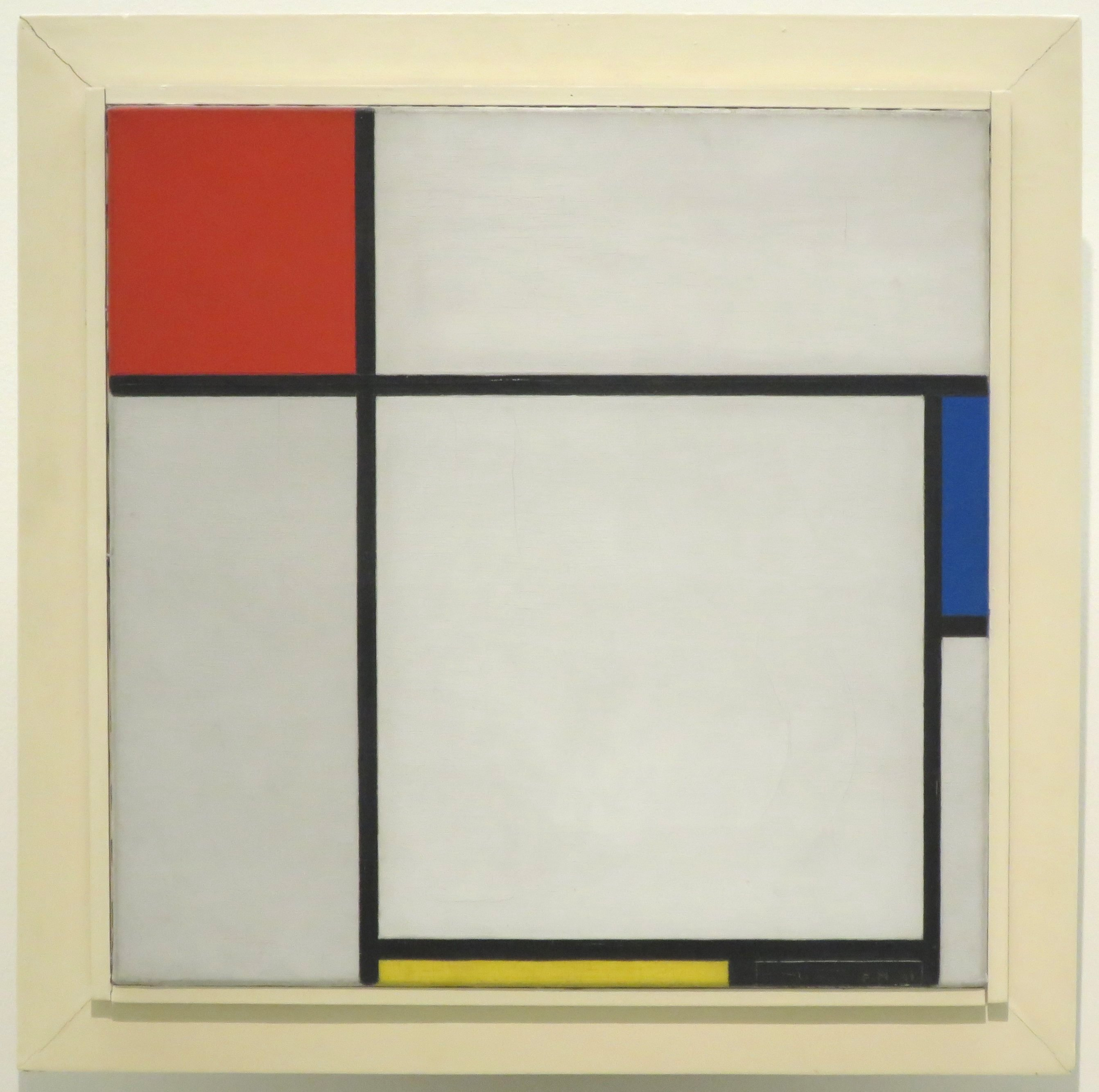
Piet Mondrian Composition, 1929

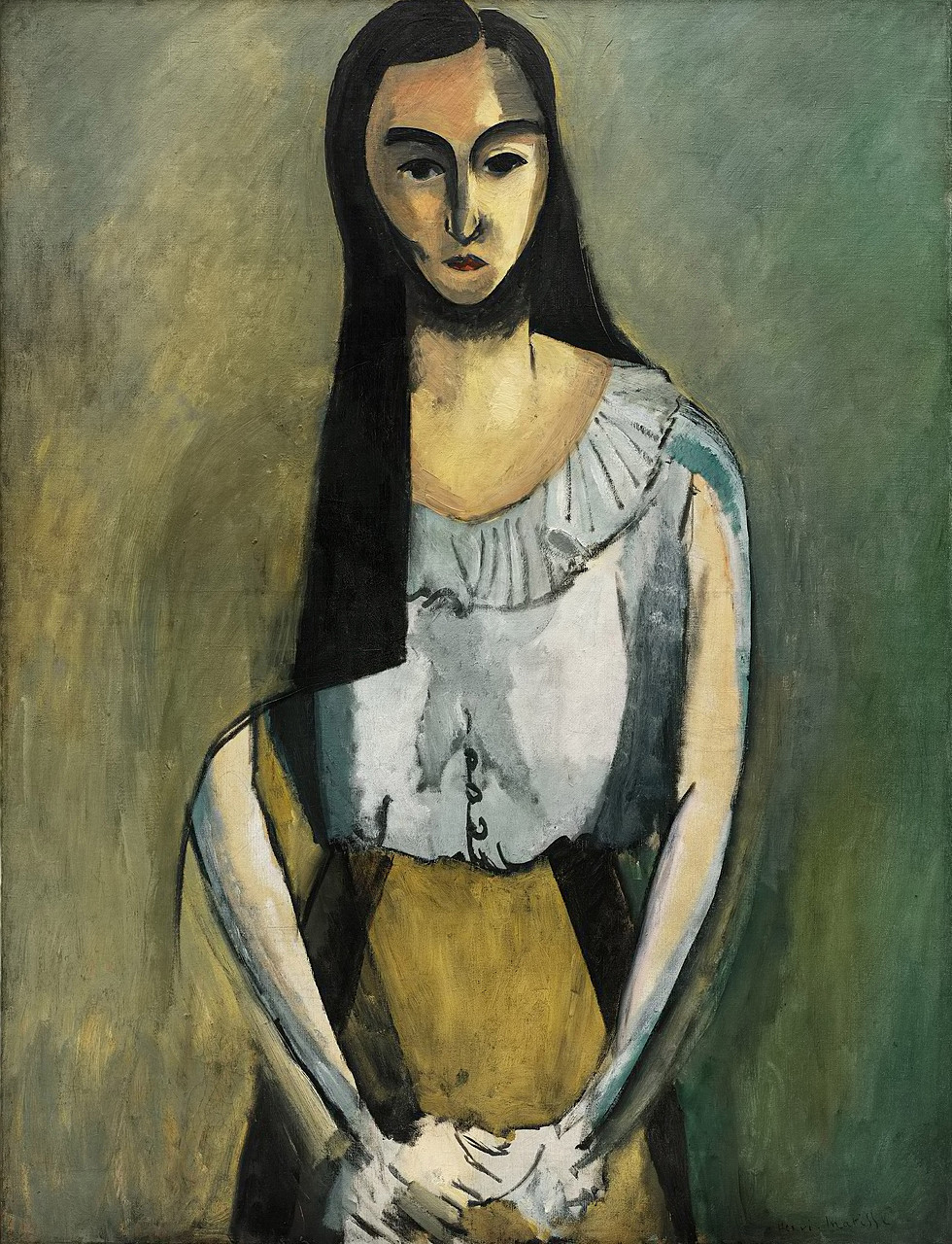
Henri Matisse Italian Woman, Oil onc canvas, 116.7 x 89.5 cm, 1931

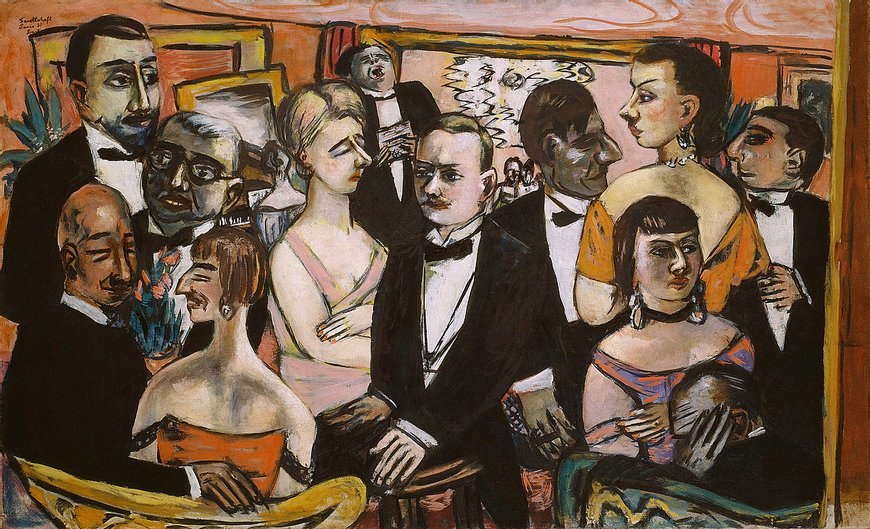
Max Beckmann Paris Society, 1931

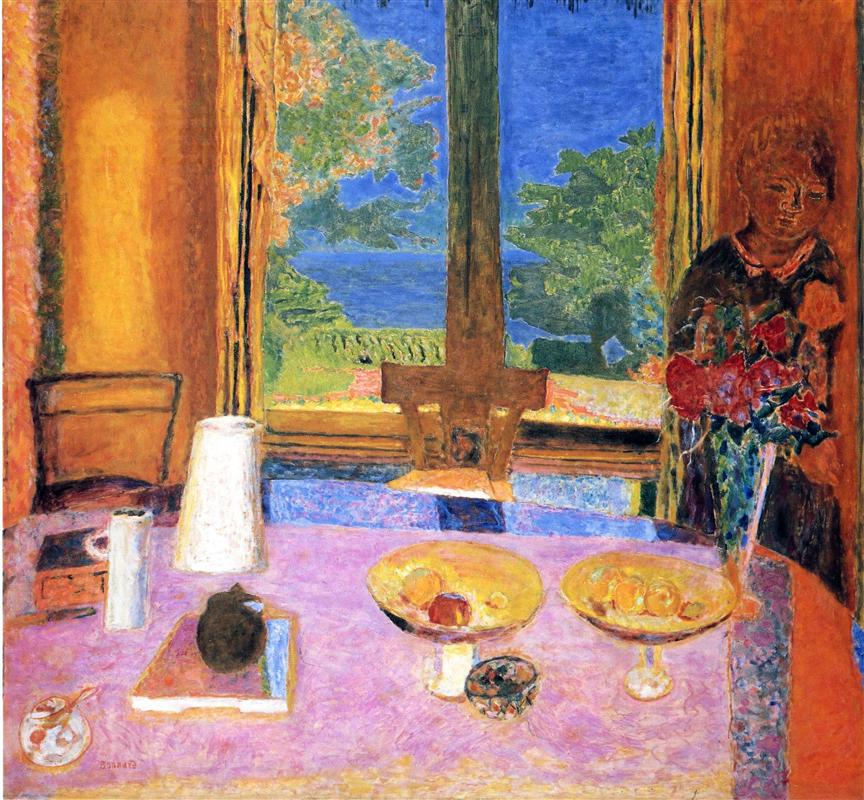
Pierre Bonnard Dinning Room on the Garden, 1935

Mark Rothko Untitled (Black on Gray) Acrylic on canvas, 203.3 x 175.5 cm 1969

== Restitution claims ==
In 2007, the heirs of Berlin banker Paul von Mendelssohn-Bartholdy requested the restitution of the Picasso painting "Le Moulin de la Galette" (1900), which they claimed he had sold under duress by the Nazis. The museum and the heirs settled the lawsuit in 2009. The presiding judge, Jed Rakoff, criticized the secrecy of the accord. In 2018, the museum returned the Ernst Ludwig Kirchner painting Artillerymen (1915) to the heirs of Alfred Flechtheim, who had owned the painting before it fell into the hands of a Nazi collector in 1938.

In 2023, the heirs of Karl and Rosie Adler sued the Guggenheim to claim the restitution of a Picasso painting, Woman Ironing (La repasseuse) (1904), which the Adlers sold to Justin Thannhauser in 1938, allegedly for a fraction of its value, to escape the Holocaust. They alleged that Thannhauser knowingly purchased the painting, and art from other Jews on the run, profiting unfairly from their distress. The museum says they contacted the Adler family before acquiring the painting as a part of Thannhauser's bequest of his art collection in 1976, and at that time Karl Adler did not object.

The Guggenheim lists 289 artworks on the Nazi Era Provenance Internet Portal (NEPIP) but does not publish provenance for its collection.

== Governance and staff ==
The Solomon R. Guggenheim Foundation operates and owns the Solomon R. Guggenheim Museum. The foundation's art and museum committee is responsible for proposing acquisitions and deaccessions from the foundation's collection, while the foundation's board of trustees determines whether to enact the art and museum committee's proposals. J. Tomilson Hill has served as the board's chair since 2021, while Marcy Withington has been the foundation's chief financial officer since 2018. The museum employed 315 full-time and part-time staff members in 2020.

== Reception and commentary ==
=== Contemporary views ===
Even before the building opened, the design polarized architecture critics and was controversial among the public. Some critics believed the building would overshadow the museum's artworks. Emily Genauer of the New York Herald Tribune said the building had been likened to "a giant corkscrew, a washing machine and a marshmallow", while Solomon's niece Peggy Guggenheim believed it resembled "a huge garage". Members of the public felt that the building contrasted with the character of Fifth Avenue. Other critics, and many artists, worried that it would be difficult to properly hang paintings in the shallow, windowless, concave exhibition niches around the main gallery. Prior to the opening of the museum, 21 artists signed a letter protesting the display of their work in such a space. Phyllis Mark of the New Leader commented that the walls and ceilings would "disorient the viewer" and noted that the museum could only display five percent of its collection in the new building.

Art critics reviewed the structure especially harshly. John Canaday of The New York Times wrote that the design would be worthy of merit if it were "stripped of its pictures", while Hilton Kramer of Arts Magazine opined that the structure was "what is probably [Wright's] most useless edifice". Architectural critic Lewis Mumford summed up the opprobrium:

Wright has allotted the paintings and sculptures on view only as much space as would not infringe upon his abstract composition. ... [He] created a shell whose form has no relation to its function and offered no possibility of future departure from his rigid preconceptions. [The ramp] has, for a museum, a low ceiling – nine feet eight inches [295 cm] so only a picture well within the vertical boundaries thus created can be shown. The wall ... slanted outward, following the outward slant of the exterior wall, and paintings were not supposed to be hung vertically or shown in their true plane but were to be tilted back against it. ... Nor [can a visitor] escape the light shining in his eyes from the narrow slots in the wall.

During his lifetime, Wright dismissed criticism of the structure, saying: "For the first time, art will be seen through an open window and, of all places, in New York". He also felt that his design complemented Central Park, particularly with the shrubbery around the new building, which formed "a little park with a building in it". Wright believed that the building would be well suited to avant-garde art, "which purported to represent space and form in a new, fully integrated manner".

The building also received critical acclaim. In a 1958 survey of the "Seven Wonders of American Architecture", five hundred architects ranked the Guggenheim as the 18th-best structure of more than 100 selected buildings. When the building opened, modernist architects such as Philip Johnson and Edward Durell Stone praised Wright's design, and Genauer regarded it as "the most beautiful building in America". This sentiment was shared even by commentators who questioned the building's functionality, including Robert M. Coates of The New Yorker, who wrote: "My question is not 'Is it art?' (I believe it is) but 'How well will it house art?'". A writer for the New York Daily Mirror said the Guggenheim "should be put in a museum to show how mad the twentieth century is." Directors of other major New York City museums also praised the building, though some of them were skeptical of whether the structure could function well as a museum.

=== Impact and retrospective commentary ===
In later years, the building became widely praised. Marcus Whiffen and Frederick Koeper wrote: "The dynamic interior of the Guggenheim is, for some, too competitive for the display of art, but no one disputes that it is one of the memorable spaces in all of architecture." Paul Goldberger said in 2009: "I think the legacy of this building is in the message that architecture does not have to lie down and play dead in front of art." According to Herbert Muschamp, the Guggenheim was "one of New York's most distinguished landmarks", as well as Wright's best-known design. The American Institute of Architects gave a Twenty-five Year Award to the Guggenheim in 1986, describing the museum's building as "an architectural landmark and a monument to Wright's unique vision".

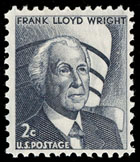
2 cent U.S. postage stamp honoring Wright, with the Guggenheim in the background (1966)

Several writers described the Guggenheim as representing Wright's tendency toward organic architecture. According to William J. R. Curtis, the building was "the apotheosis of Wright's organic philosophy". Peter Blake commented that the Guggenheim was Wright's "only completed work of uncompromising plasticity and continuity", a claim with which Wright's biographer Robert C. Twombly agreed. Critics came to regard the Guggenheim as the best work of Wright's later career, as well as a culmination of the helical shapes that Wright had used in his designs since 1925. Spiro Kostof called the museum "a gift of pure architecture", and Edgar Kaufmann Jr. said the building was "one of the irrefutably grand achievements of modern architecture". Architect Annabelle Selldorf wrote in 2026 that the Guggenheim's "sculptural form continues to delight and challenge", citing the curved exterior's contrast with surrounding buildings, and the main gallery with its ramp.

The museum building inspired other architects' designs. Several similar buildings were developed in the 1960s, although they generally used less concrete than the Guggenheim did. Deborah Solomon of The New York Times Magazine wrote in 2002 that the Guggenheim inspired the phenomenon of "the museum that is just walls", wherein museums competed for the best-designed buildings. The building was also depicted in a two-cent postage stamp issued in Wright's honor in 1966. The American Institute of Architects' 2007 survey List of America's Favorite Architecture ranked the Guggenheim Museum 74th on a list of the top 150 buildings in the United States. In 2026, Architectural Record magazine included the Guggenheim Museum on its list of "the most significant works of American architecture".

== Attendance ==
When the building opened, it was popular with the general public. A 1960 Gallup poll found that 38 percent of visitors came for the building itself, while an additional 43 percent wanted to see both the building and the art. The Guggenheim did not keep precise attendance records until 1992. Before its 1990s renovation, it had an estimated 600,000 annual visitors. This increased to between 900,000 and 1 million by the early 2000s. It had 960,000 annual visitors before the September 11 attacks, but attendance decreased after the attacks; it recovered several years later. In 2013, nearly 1.2 million people visited the museum, and its James Turrell exhibition was the most popular in New York City in daily attendance. Due to the COVID-19 pandemic, the Guggenheim had only 154,000 visitors in 2020, an 88 percent decrease from the preceding year. In 2023, the museum had 861,000 visitors, compared with 1.2 million in 2019 (before the COVID-19 pandemic).

According to museum officials, surveys over the years have indicated that most visitors came because of the building's architecture rather than its artwork. In 2001, The New York Times reported that nearly 70 percent were tourists and that half were foreigners. In 2010, the Times reported that 55–65 percent of visitors were from the New York metropolitan area. According to a 2018 study, 73 percent of the museum's visitors were white and 8 percent were black.

In 2009, a Frank Lloyd Wright retrospective attracted 372,000 visitors in three months, becoming the museum's single most popular exhibit. This record was broken the next year by a Kandinsky exhibit. As of 2022, the most popular exhibition in the museum's history was a 2019 exhibition of Hilma af Klint paintings, which attracted over 600,000 visitors in six months.

== See also ==
- List of Frank Lloyd Wright works
- List of Guggenheim Museums
- List of most-visited museums in the United States
- List of National Historic Landmarks in New York City
- List of New York City Designated Landmarks in Manhattan from 59th to 110th Streets
- List of World Heritage Sites in the United States
- National Register of Historic Places listings in Manhattan from 59th to 110th Streets
