= Horses in Landscape =

Painting by Franz Marc

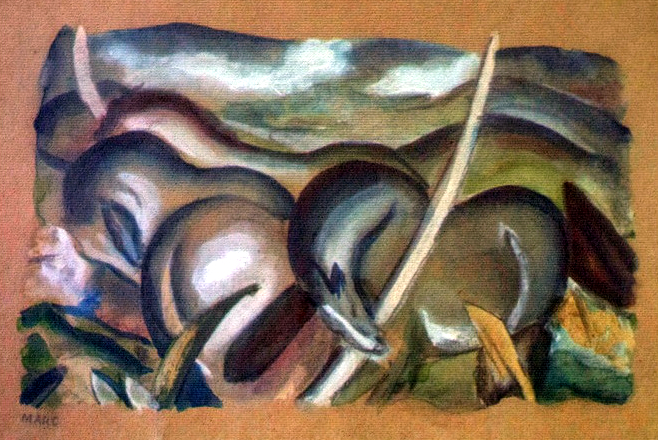
- Artist: Franz Marc
- Year: 1911
- Medium: Watercolour
- Dimensions: 12.1 cm × 19.6 cm (4.8 in × 7.7 in)

Horses in Landscape is a watercolour with pencil on paper by the German painter Franz Marc, executed in 1911. It is probably a study, which was thought to be lost, for the painting Blue Horses (1911). The painting became known worldwide on the occasion of the Schwabing art discovery in November 2013. It was one of the first eleven works to be shown at a press conference by the Augsburg public prosecutor. The small-format work measures 12.1 × 19.6 cm.

== Description ==
The three horses in the study, painted in a sideways position or from behind, are brown-blue in colour. They stand with their heads bowed to the left, in front of a mountainous landscape, which is vaulted by a sky with white clouds. The outlines of the horses reflect the mountains. The two knotless, white tree trunks in the foreground and background, which look like a diagonal, are striking. The front trunk is touched by the horse in the foreground. The watercolour was made on brown paper, and its edges appear irregular. It is signed on the left edge of the picture without specifying the year.

== Variation ==
The famous Marc painting from the same year, Blue Horses created after this study in oil on canvas, has the dimensions 106 × 181 cm and shows the same motif, with only the colours changed significantly. The horse's bodies are held in a strong blue, the landscape and sky have red and purple tones that do not correspond to reality. The paintings Blue Horse I and Blue Horse II were also created in 1911. In all of the horse pictures of this time, Marc turns blue from an “appearance colour” to an “essential colour”. The colour blue stood for the male principle in his own colour theory. With the animal image he found a symbol for a “spiritualization of the world”. The blue horses push like the blue flower searching out for deliverance from earthly weight and material bondage. In 1913 he created the painting The Tower of Blue Horses, again with blue horses as a motif, whose whereabouts have been unknown since 1945.

== Provenance ==
On 5 November 2013, a televised press conference by art historian Meike Hoffmann, on the Schwabing Art Find (Gurlitt Collection), presented the current painting alongside Max Liebermann's work Two Riders on the Beach, and nine other paintings. Like the other works shown, it came from the collection of the art dealer Hildebrand Gurlitt, which was inherited by his son Cornelius Gurlitt. The Augsburg public prosecutor's office under the direction of Reinhard Nemetz confiscated its collection in February 2012. The case was made known to the public in a report on November 3, 2013.

The former owner of the watercolour until 1937 was the Moritzburg Art and Industry Museum in Halle, and it had been acquired by its director Max Sauerlandt in 1914. A former employee of the museum recognized the coloured painting, which had previously only been documented in black and white. The Expressionist work was considered "degenerate" by the Nazi regimen, removed and confiscated from the museum, and came afterwards into the possession of Hildebrand Gurlitt. The museum in Moritzburg aims to return it.

== See also ==
- List of works by Franz Marc
