= Blue Mustang =

Sculpture in Denver, Colorado

Mustang
- Blucifer
- Artist: Luis Jiménez
- Completion date: February 11, 2008
- Medium: Cast fiberglass
- Subject: Mustang
- Dimensions: 9.8 m (32 ft)
- Weight: approx. 9,000 lb (4,100 kg)
- Location: Denver International Airport, Denver, Colorado, United States; 39°50′03″N 104°40′35″W
- Owner: Denver International Airport

Blue Mustang (colloquially known as Blucifer) is a cast-fiberglass sculpture of a mustang located at Denver International Airport (DEN), standing on its two back legs, colored bright blue with gold highlights and illuminated glowing red eyes. It is notable for its striking appearance and for having killed its sculptor, Luis Jiménez, when a section of it fell on him at his studio.

== Construction ==
=== Origin ===
Blue Mustang was commissioned in 1992 for $300,000, but it was not installed at Denver International Airport until 2008. The statue was paid for by developers, who have been required since 1988 to contribute one percent of the cost of major capital projects to public art in the city.

The original proposal had been for a sculpture of a bison stampede, but this was deemed inappropriate since bison had been hunted to near extinction in the Western United States. Jiménez then proposed a mustang – a symbol of the Western United States and an early method of long-distance travel. The piece was partly modeled on Jiménez's own Appaloosa stallion Blackjack, a horse that he bought in fulfillment of a childhood desire after becoming a successful artist. The sculpture was meant to welcome Colorado residents and visitors as they entered and exited the gateway to the Western United States. The artist, born in Texas, had spent years celebrating the American West through his large-scale fiberglass sculptures, characterized by bold colors.

Jiménez completed five similar horse sculptures at a smaller scale before completing the 32-foot (9.8 m) Blue Mustang, four of which are held in private collections. The 8-foot (2.4 m) Mesteño was completed in 1997, served as one-quarter model for the 32-foot sculpture, and has been part of the University of Oklahoma's public collection since 1998. Since its installation and dedication in 2008, the sculpture has attracted disagreement and even fear regarding its size. Multiple colloquial names for Blue Mustang were developed, including "Demon Mustang", "Satan's Stallion", and "Blucifer".

=== Medical setbacks ===
Jiménez suffered multiple health complications such as consistent migraines, several corrective surgeries on his vision resulting in a glass eye, and a back injury from a car accident in his youth. On top of these existing health issues, Jiménez suffered a heart attack and required surgery on his hands during the years of production for the sculpture.

=== Legal disputes ===
After missed deadlines, the city sued Jiménez for the $165,000 it had paid him up front of his $300,000 commission. Jiménez countersued. Mediation decided that Jiménez would complete the sculpture.

=== Fatal accident ===
Jiménez was killed in 2006 at age 65 in his studio in Hondo, New Mexico, when one of the sculpture's three sections came loose from a hoist, pinning him against a steel support beam and severing an artery in his leg. He bled to death on his studio floor before being declared dead on arrival at the Lincoln County Medical Center in southern New Mexico, 28 miles (45 km) away from his home.

=== Completion ===
Jiménez had declared the painting of the head complete, and friends and family contemplated whether to leave the sculpture incomplete, to destroy it, or to complete it after his death. They elected to complete the sculpture, which was done with the help of the artist's staff, family, and painters Camillo Nuñez and Richard LaVato. It was then sent to California for assembly and shipped to Denver International Airport for erection. Blue Mustang was unveiled at Denver International Airport on February 11, 2008.

== Appearance ==
The statue is the largest of Jiménez's career at 32 feet (9.8 m) and approximately 9,000 pounds (4,100 kg) including its steel armature. It has glowing eyes illuminated by LED flood lights, which are a tribute to Jiménez's father, who ran a neon sign shop that Jiménez worked at as a youth in El Paso, Texas. Jiménez's father taught him how to use neon lights, how to spray paint, and how to weld.

Some early sketches had the sculpture as yellow or pink. The choice of blue may have been inspired by Jiménez's own horse Blackjack, a blue roan Appaloosa, as well as by stories about a mythical blue stallion in San Luis Valley. The paintwork is a tribute to the lowrider culture which Jiménez grew up with in El Paso. In a 2016 April Fools' Day joke, Denver Airport held a Facebook poll to choose a new color for the horse.

The sculpture was bolted onto a concrete base in the median of Peña Boulevard. Original designs involved a more ornate base and a roadside area where viewers could closely approach the sculpture, but the roadside turn-off was cancelled after the September 11 attacks over security concerns. There had also been tentative plans to put the sculpture inside the terminal, but the space was needed for the Transportation Security Administration. Airport visitors are not allowed to closely approach the sculpture.

== Reception ==
The sculpture has been both widely disparaged and praised. Locals have taken to calling it "Blucifer", though the artist's estate dislikes the demonic associations. A Facebook group made in 2009 garnered national attention for requesting that the sculpture be removed, but the creator of the page eventually decided that she wanted it to stay. Removing the statue was broached again in 2016 with talk of petitioning the City of Denver to remove it. Rachel Hultin, a real estate agent in Denver, Colorado, created a website to give voices to those who find the sculpture frightening and want it moved to a less prominent location. Hultin says, "Things with glowing eyes are culturally associated with the dead...it's not a positive image."

The statue has also been noted for its prominent veins, scrotum, and anus, as well as its overall phallic quality. In September 2019, the piece was vandalized with orange graffiti on its hooves.

The city ultimately paid $650,000 for the sculpture. A 2007 appraisal valued the work at $2,000,000, and the city has insured it at that value.

== See also ==
- Blue Horse I
- Blue Horses
- Little Blue Horse
- Dance of the Cranes
