= Two Women on the Hillside =

Painting by Franz Marc

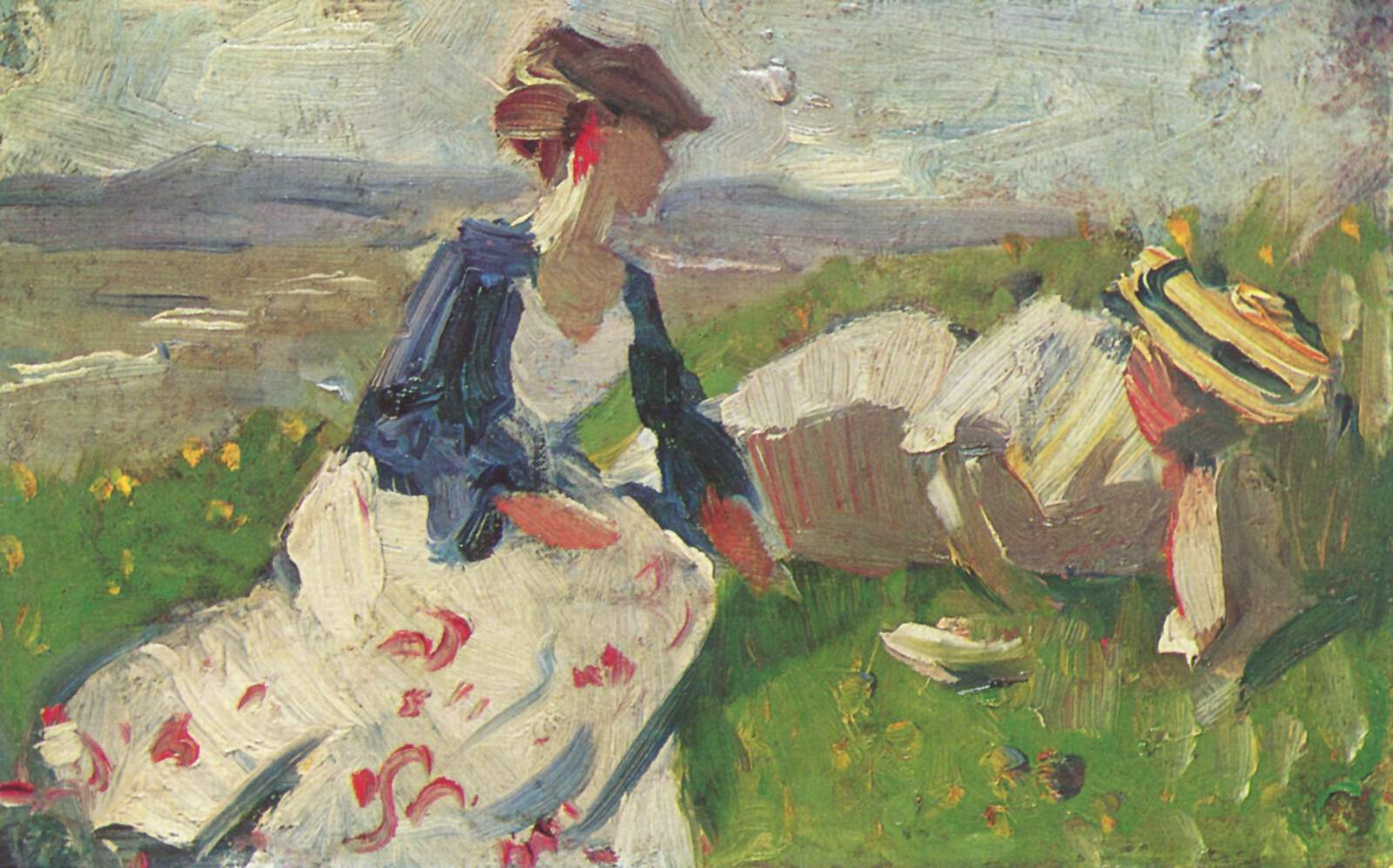
- Artist: Franz Marc
- Year: 1906
- Medium: Oil on canvas
- Dimensions: 15.5 cm × 25.7 cm (6.1 in × 10.1 in)
- Location: Franz Marc Museum; Kochel am See

Two Women on the Hillside is an oil-on-canvas painting created in 1906 by German painter Franz Marc. It is part of the Bavarian State Painting Collections and is on a permanent loan at the Franz Marc Museum in Kochel am See.

== History ==
Marc met the fellow painters Marie Schnür and Maria Franck in 1905, who would both later become his wives. He spent the summer of 1906 in Kochel. He painted the women at outdoors on an alpine pasture. He first made the current small oil sketch, from which he later painted a large-format oil painting. On August 1, 1906, he wrote to Maria Franck: “The picture of you two has already been drawn.” Later he cut up the large painting. The remainder of this is the portrait of Maria Marc in the Murnau Castle Museum.

In 1985 the Bayerische Staatsgemäldesammlungen acquired the painting from the estate of Maria Marc, née Franck. It hangs on permanent loan in the Franz Marc Museum in Kochel am See.

== Description ==
The painting is 15.5 cm high and 24.7 cm wide. It was painted with oil paint on canvas and mounted on cardboard.

The picture shows the two women on a mountain meadow. Marie Schnür is sitting in the foreground in a white dress and a blue jacket and looks back at Maria Franck, who is lying in the meadow with a hat on her head, both dressed in white. Maria covers her face with her hand against the sun shining in front and seems to be reading a book lying in front of her on the meadow. The mountains of the Bavarian Prealps are shown in the background .

The light colors are applied with a broad brushstroke. Instead of a lifelike reproduction, Marc captures the mood of the scene. The work shows the influence of both the Impressionist and Post-Impressionist styles of painting.

== See also ==
- List of works by Franz Marc
