= Maria Marc =

German artist (1876–1955)

Maria Franck-Marc
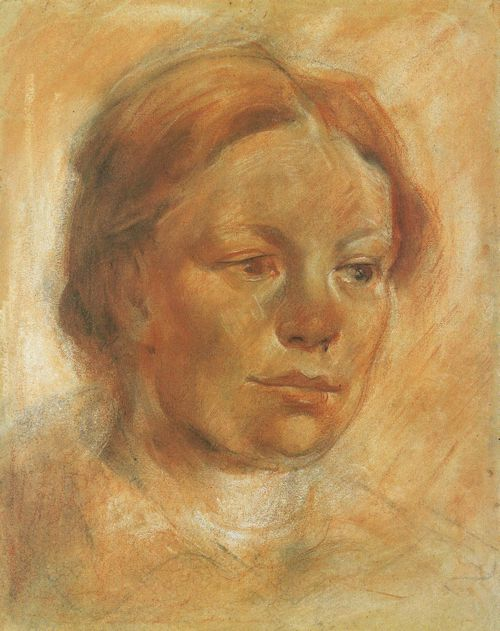
- Mädchenkopf (Bildnis Maria Franck) by Franz Marc, 1906
- Born: Bertha Pauline Marie Franck; 12 June 1876; Berlin, Germany
- Died: 25 January 1955 (aged 78); Ried, Bavaria, Germany
- Known for: Painting, textiles
- Movement: Expressionism
- Spouse: Franz Marc (m. 1913; died in 1916)

Maria Franck-Marc, née Bertha Pauline Marie Franck (12 June 1876 – 25 January 1955), was a German artist. She is also known as the wife of the painter Franz Marc.

== Early life and education ==
She was born on 12 June 1876 in Berlin, Germany. In Berlin she attended the Unterrichtanstalt des Kunstgewerbemuseum, the Königliche Akademie der Künste (Royal Academy of Arts). In 1895 she graduated as an art teacher.

In 1903 she started studying in Munchen at the Damen-Akademie des Künstlerinnen-Vereins (Ladies Academy of the Artists' Association, Munich), where she had classes from Angelo Jank en Max Feldbauer.

In 1905 she resided for several months in the art colony at Worpswede, where she painted under the guidance of Otto Modersohn. Her work from this period shows lots of landscapes, and she also developed an interest in painting children. These truly expressionist themes will stay prominent in her work for the rest of her life.

== Marriage with Franz Marc ==
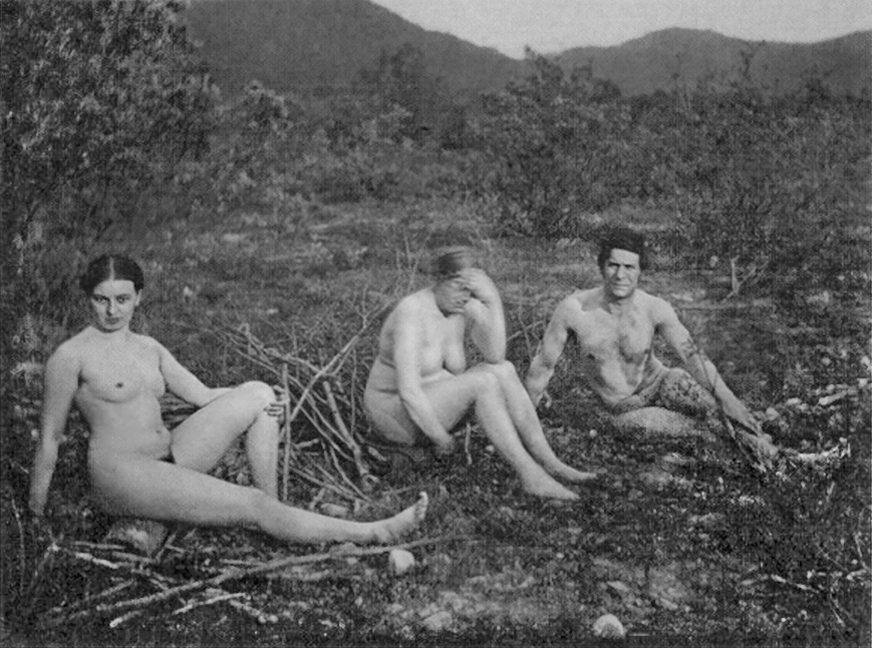
Marie Schnür, Maria Franck and Franz Marc in 1906

She met the artist Franz Marc in 1905, and started a relationship with him in 1906, possibly in a menage a trois with fellow artist Marie Schnür. Franz Marc would marry Schnür in 1907, only to divorce her a year later. In 1913 Marc and Franck got married. Her parents didn't approve of the marriage, nor of the artist lifestyle of their daughter. The pair was fascinated by Japanese woodwork.

During this time Franck worked on children's illustrations besides painting. She was hoping to get her drawings published, mainly for financial reasons.

== Blaue Reiter ==
In 1910 and 1911 Franck and Marc met with fellow artists couples August Macke and Elisabeth Erdmann-Macke, and Wassily Kandinsky and Gabriele Munter. They were briefly involved with the Neue Künstlervereinigung München but soon they decided to start their own movement: Der Blaue Reiter. The pairs Paul en Lily Klee, and Alexej von Jawlensky and Marianne von Werefkin, all living in Munich at the time, got involved. This group is considered fundamental to expressionism and was fascinated by authenticity, returning to nature, and conveying emotions through bold colours.

They organised two exhibitions, in 1911 en 1912. Maria Franck-Marc showed three pieces in the second one. Her work showed children's toys, an important theme for the Blue Rider, for whom the world of children was linked with authenticity. Macke also painted children because of an interest in natural spontaneity.

== WOI ==
After the outbreak of the First World War the group ceased to exist. Both Franz Marc and August Macke were drafted, and Kandinsky (of Russian nationality) left Germany. Franz Marc died in combat in 1916. Maria Franck-Marc organised a memorial exhibition for him in Munich. August Macke also died in the war, and the two widows, Maria Franck-Marc and Elisabeth Erdmann-Macke, stayed lifelong friends.

Because of the war and the departure of her husband, Franck-Marc stopped painting, which turned out to be definite. She started embroidering as a distraction, but soon this became an important carrier switch. Elisabeth Erdmann-Macke had also turned towards textile art.

== Bauhaus and Textile Art ==
After the war Franck-Marc travelled regularly to Weimar and Dessau, where she rekindled the friendship with Kandinsky and Klee. In 1922 she started studying at Bauhaus in Weimar, fully committing herself to textile art, now with a focus on weaving.

Between 1929 and 1938 she mainly resided in Ascona (in Switzerland), nearby her friend Marianne von Werefkin. She frequented Monte Verità, a sanatorium and meeting place for artists, pacifists and revolutionaries.

This period turned out to be very productive: she designed and weaved tapistries according to her own artistic views, with clear influence of Paul Klee's compositions.

== Later life and death ==
During World War 2 she stayed at home in Munich, and Elisabeth Erdmann-Macke moved in with her for a while, together with her two kids. After the war she went back to Switzerland more often.

Her own work was exhibited again only once: in 1952 she showed eleven tapestries in the Munich gallery of Otto Stangl.

Maria Marc died on 25 January 1955 in Ried, Bavaria. After her death Stangl was in charge of the preservation of her art. He played a big role in the foundation of the Franz Marc Museum.

== Exhibitions ==
Her work is permanently shown at:

- Lenbachhaus in München
- Franz Marc Museum in Kochel am See (in Bavaria)
- MoMA in New York City
