= List of works by Franz Marc =

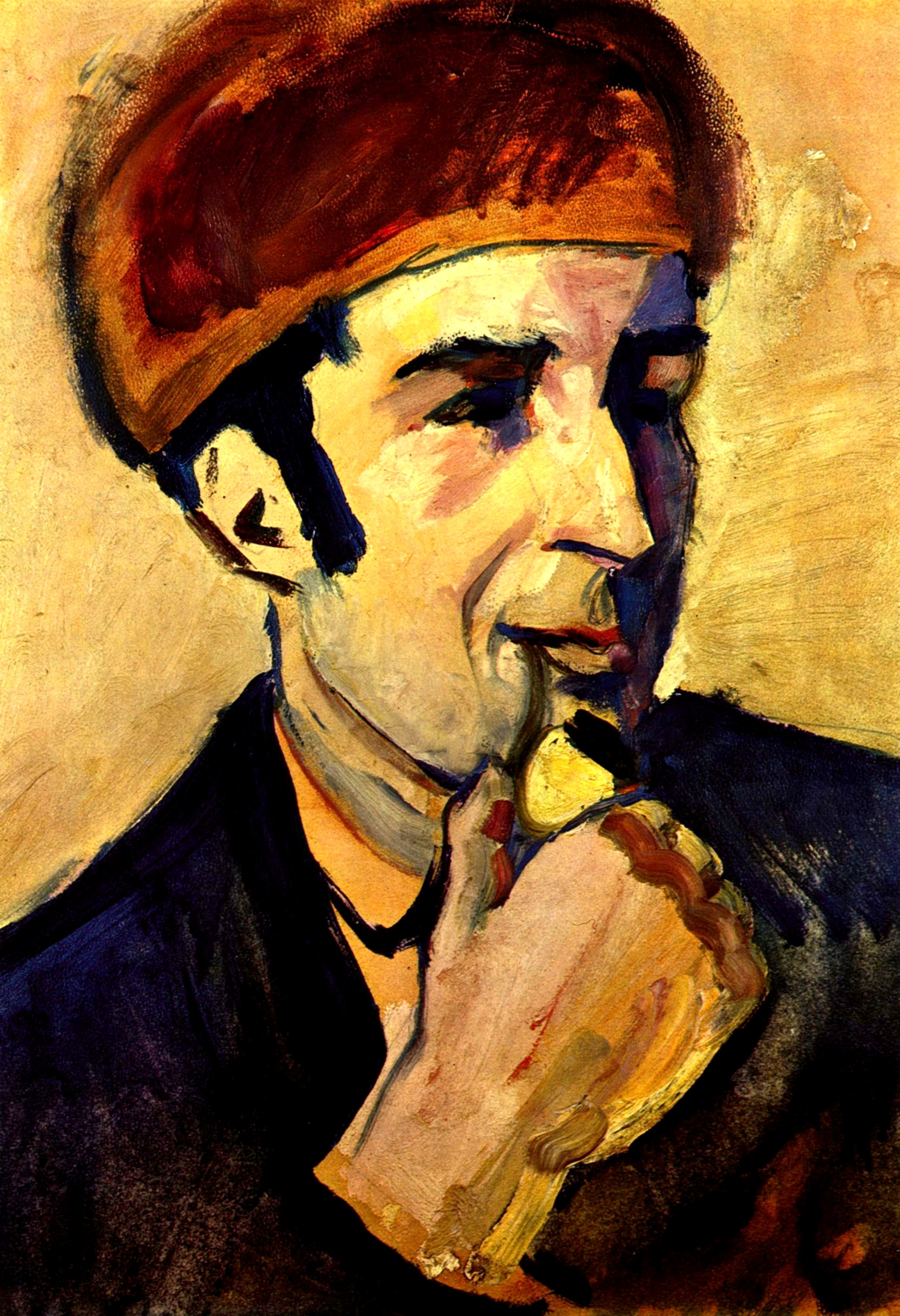
August Macke: Portrait of Franz Marc

This article lists a selection of notable works created by Franz Marc. The listing follows the book Franz Marc: 1880-1916.

== Paintings ==
Image Title in German	Year Title in English	Location	Made from Material H x W in cm Wikimedia
Bildnis der Mutter	1902; Portrait of the Mother	Lenbachhaus, Munich	Oil paint Canvas; 98.5 x 70; More images
Bildnis des Vaters	1902; Portrait of the Father	Lenbachhaus, Munich	Oil paint Cardboard; 72,8 x 51; More images
Moorhütten im Dachauer Moos	1902; Hut in Dachau Moors	Franz Marc Museum	Oil paint Canvas; 43.5 x 73.6; More images
Heidekraut	1902; Heather	Pinakothek der Moderne, Munich	Oil paint Cardboard; 15 x 24.7; More images
Aufsteigende Nebel	1903; Rising Fog	Pinakothek der Moderne, Munich	Oil paint Cardboard; 32.7 x 52.3; More images
Indersdorf	1904; Indersdorf	Lenbachhaus, Munich	Oil paint Canvas; 40 x 31.6; More images
Selbstbildnis in bretonischer Tracht	1904; Self-portrait in Breton costume	Lenbachhaus, Munich	Oil paint Canvas; 99 x 66.5; More images
Heuwagen	1905; Hay wagon	Pinakothek der Moderne, Munich	Oil paint Paper; 20 x 27.4; More images
Kleine Pferdestudie I	1905; Small Horse Study I	Pinakothek der Moderne, Munich	Oil paint Canvas; 32.7 x 31.6; More images
Kleine Pferdestudie II	1905; Small Horse Study II	Pinakothek der Moderne, Munich	Oil paint Canvas; 15.5 x 24; More images
Nebel zwischen Tannen	1905; Fog between firs	Staatliche Kunsthalle, Karlsruhe	Oil paint Cardboard; 14.8 x 24.3; More images
Der tote Spatz	1905; The dead sparrow	Private collection	Oil paint Wood; 13 x 16.5; More images
Bildnis Maria Frank	1906; Portrait Maria Frank	Pinakothek der Moderne, Munich	Oil paint Canvas; 40 x 30; More images
Der Vater auf dem Krankenbett I	1906; The father on the sickbed I	Pinakothek der Moderne, Munich	Oil paint Canvas; 49.6 x 62.8; More images
Frau in Winterlandschaft	1906; Woman in winter landscape	Pinakothek der Moderne, Munich	Oil paint Canvas; 15.5 x 24; More images
Lesende Frau im Grünen	1906; Reading woman in the green	Pinakothek der Moderne, Munich	Oil paint Cardboard; 27.4 x 29.7; More images
Pferdeskizze I	1906; Horse sketch I	Pinakothek der Moderne, Munich	Oil paint Canvas; 27 x 30.9; More images
Pferdeskizze II	1906; Horse sketch II	Pinakothek der Moderne, Munich	Oil paint Canvas; 24.2 x 38; More images
Zwei Frauen am Berg	1906; Two Women on the Hillside	Pinakothek der Moderne, Munich	Oil paint Canvas; 16 x 24.5; More images
Frau im Wind am Meer	1907; Woman in the wind by the sea	Pinakothek der Moderne, Munich	Oil paint Paper; 24.8 x 15.8; More images
Pferde am Meer	1907; Horses by the sea	Pinakothek der Moderne, Munich	Oil paint Paper; 20.1 x 25.3; More images
Reiter am Strand	1907; Rider on the beach	Museum Folkwang, Essen	Oil paint Canvas on cardboard 15.5 x 25; More images
Großes Pferdebild Lenggries I	1908; Large Horse Picture Lenggries I	Private collection	Oil paint Cardboard; 104.8 x 206; More images
Springender Hund	1908; Leaping dog	Lenbachhaus, Munich	Oil paint Canvas; 54.5 x 67.5; More images
Springende Fohlen	1909; Foals in the pasture	Private collection	Oil paint Canvas; 51 x 70; More images
Katzen auf rotem Tuch	1909; Cats on a Red Cloth	Private collection	Oil paint Canvas; 50.5 x 60.5; More images
Kleines Pferdebild	1909; Small horse picture	Franz Marc Museum, Kochel	Oil paint Canvas; 16 x 25; More images
Rehe im Schilf	1909; Deer in the reeds	Neue Pinakothek, Munich	Oil paint Canvas; 88 x 78; More images
Rehe im Schilf	1909; Deer at dusk	Lenbachhaus, Munich	Oil paint Canvas; 70.5 x 100.5; More images
Sibirische Schaeferhunde	1909; Siberian Shepherd Dogs	National Gallery of Art, Washington D.C.	Oil paint Canvas; 80.5 x 114; More images
Badende Frauen	1910; Bathing Girls	Norton Simon Museum, Pasadena	Oil paint Canvas; 109.2 x 142.2; More images
Pferd in Landschaft	1910; Horse in a landscape	Museum Folkwang, Essen	Oil paint Canvas; 85 x 112; More images
Weidende Pferde I	1910; Grazing Horses I	Lenbachhaus, Munich	Oil paint Canvas; 64 x 94; More images
Weidende Pferde III	1910; Grazing Horses III	2	Oil paint Canvas; 60 x 90; More images
Weidende Pferde IV	1911; Grazing Horses IV	Harvard Art Museums	Oil paint Canvas; 121 x 183; More images
Affenfries	1911; Monkey frieze	Hamburger Kunsthalle	Oil paint Canvas; 75.5 x 135.5; More images
Eselfries	1911; Donkey Frieze	Franz Marc Museum, Kochel	Oil paint Canvas; 81 x 150; More images
Blaues Pferd I	1911; Blue Horse I	Lenbachhaus, Munich	Oil paint Canvas; 112 x 84.5; More images
Blaues Pferd II	1911; Blue Horse II	Kunstmuseum Bern	Oil paint Canvas; 112 x 86; More images
Fuchs	1911; Fox	Von der Heydt Museum, Wuppertal	Oil paint Canvas; 63.5 x 50; More images
Die gelbe Kuh	1911; Yellow Cow	Solomon R. Guggenheim Museum, New York	Oil paint Canvas; 140.5 x 189.2; More images
Die großen blauen Pferde	1911; The Large Blue Horses	Walker Art Center, Minneapolis	Oil paint Canvas; 105.7 x 181.1; More images
Die kleinen blauen Pferde	1911; The Little Blue Horses	Staatsgalerie Stuttgart	Oil paint Canvas; 61 x 101; More images
Gebirge	1911; Mountains	San Francisco Museum of Modern Art	Oil paint Canvas; 130.8 x 100.9; More images
Knabe mit Lamm	1911; Young Boy with a Lamb	Solomon R. Guggenheim Museum	Oil paint Canvas; 88 x 83.8; More images
Liegender Hund im Schnee	1911; Dog Lying in the snow	Städel Museum	Oil paint Canvas; 105 x 62.5; More images
Akte unter Bäumen	1911; Nudes under Trees	Museum Kunstpalast, Düsseldorf	Oil paint Canvas; 110 x 180; More images
Pferde in Landschaft	1911; Horses in Landscape	Schwabinger Kunstfund, Munich	Oil paint Canvas; 12.1 x 19.6; More images
Rehe im Schnee II	1911; Deer in the snow II	Lenbachhaus, Munich	Oil paint Canvas; 84.7 x 84.5; More images
Spielende Wiesel	1911; Weasels at Play	National Gallery of Art, Washington D.C.	Oil paint Canvas; 101 x 68; More images
Der Stier	1911; White Bull	Solomon R. Guggenheim Museum, New York	Oil paint Canvas; 100 x 135.2; More images
Das kleine blaue Pferdchen	1911; Little Blue Horse	Saarland Museum	Oil paint Canvas; 57.5 x 73; More images
Das Äffchen	1912; The little monkey	Lenbachhaus, Munich	Oil paint Canvas; 70.4 x 100; More images
Die kleinen gelben Pferde	1912; Little yellow horses	Staatsgalerie Stuttgart	Oil paint Canvas; 66 x 104; More images
Drei Tiere	1912; Three Animals	Kunsthalle Mannheim	Oil paint Canvas; 80 x 105; More images
Im Regen	1912; In the rain	Lenbachhaus, Munich	Oil paint Canvas; 81.5 x 106; More images
Kühe, rot, grün, gelb	1912; Cows Red Green Yellow	Lenbachhaus, Munich	Oil paint Canvas; 62 x 88; More images
Paradies	1912; Paradise; Cooperation with August Macke	Westphalian State Museum of Art and Cultural History, Münster	Tempera on oil on plaster (mural); 400 x 200; More images
Pferde und Adler	1912; Horses and Eagle	Sprengel Museum, Hanover	Oil paint Canvas; 100 x 135.5; More images
Reh im Klostergarten	1912; Deer in a Monastery Garden	Lenbachhaus, Munich	Oil paint Canvas; 75.7 x 101; More images
Rote Rehe II	1912; Red Deer II	Neue Pinakothek, Munich	Oil paint Canvas; 75.7 x 101; More images
Roter Stier	1912; Red bull	Pushkin Museum, Moscow	Oil paint Canvas; 34 x 43; More images
Rotes und blaues Pferd	1912; Red and Blue Horses	Lenbachhaus, Munich	Tempera; Cardboard; 26.5 x 34; More images
Der Traum	1912; The Dream	Thyssen-Bornemisza Museum, Madrid	Oil paint Canvas; 100.5 x 135.5; More images
Tiger	1912; Tiger	Lenbachhaus, Munich	Oil paint Canvas; 111.7 x 101.8; More images
Rinder I	1913; Cattle I	Neue Pinakothek, Munich	Oil paint Canvas; 92 x 130.8; More images
Bison im Winter (Roter Bison)	1913; Bison in Winter (The Red Bison)	Kunstmuseum, Basel	Oil paint Canvas; 66.5 x 71.2; More images
Blaues Pferd mit Regenbogen	1913; Blue Horse with Rainbow	Museum of Modern Art, New York City	Watercolor, gouache and pencil Paper; 16.5 x 26; More images
Chamäleon	1913; Chameleon	Sprengel Museum, Hanover	Tempera; Paper; 16 x 25.5; More images
Das arme Land Tirol	1913; The Unfortunate Land of Tyrol	Solomon R. Guggenheim Museum, New York	Oil paint Canvas; 131.1 x 200; More images
Das Schaf	1913; The Sheep	Museum Boijmans Van Beuningen, Rotterdam	Oil paint Canvas; 54.5 x 77; More images
St Julian der Johanniter	1913; St. Julian the Hospitaler	Solomon R. Guggenheim Museum, New York	Oil paint Canvas; 46 x 40.2; More images
Der Mandrill	1913; The mandrill	Neue Pinakothek, Munich	Oil paint Canvas; 91 x 131; More images
Die ersten Tiere	1913; The First Animals	Private collection	Tempera; Paper; 39 x 46.5; More images
Die kleinen Bergziegen	1913; The Little Mountain Goats	Saint Louis Art Museum	Oil paint Canvas; 60.6 x 40.6; More images
Die verzauberte Mühle	1913; The Bewitched Mill	Art Institute of Chicago	Oil paint Canvas; 130 x 90.8; More images
Die Weltenkuh	1913; The World Cow	Museum of Modern Art, New York City	Oil paint Canvas; 130 x 90.8; More images
Drei Katzen	1913; Three Cats	Kunstsammlung Nordrhein-Westfalen, Münster	Oil paint Canvas; 72 x 102; More images
Drei Pferde an der Tränke	1913; Three horses at the watering place	Staatliche Kunsthalle Karlsruhe	Oil paint Canvas; 39.7 x 45.5; More images
Fabeltier II (Pferd)	1913; Mythical creature II (horse)	Private collection	Tempera; 26 x 30.5; More images
Tierschicksale	1913; Fate of the Animals	Kunstmuseum, Basel	Color; Canvas; 196 x 266; More images
Die Füchse I	1913; The Foxes I	Private collection	Oil paint Canvas; 44.5 x 39; More images
Die Füchse II	1913; The Foxes II	Private collection	Color; Canvas; 88 x 66; More images
Gazellen	1913; Gazelles	Museum Kunstpalast, Düsseldorf	Tempera; 55.5 x 71; More images
Kleine Komposition I	1913; Small composition I	Private collection	Oil paint Canvas; 46.5 x 41.5; More images
Liegender Stier	1913; Lying bull	Museum Folkwang, Essen	Oil paint Canvas; 40 x 46; More images
Reh im Blumengarten	1913; Deer in flower garden	Kunsthalle Bremen	Oil paint Canvas; 55.3 x 77.4; More images
Rehe im Wald	1913; Deer in the Forest I	The Phillips Collection, Washington D.C.	Oil paint Canvas; 100.9 x 104.7; More images
Rinder	1913; Cattle	Museum Ludwig, Cologne	Color; Paperboard; 30 x 51; More images
Rotes Reh	1913; Red Deer	Solomon R. Guggenheim Museum, New York	Watercolor, gouache, and graphite Paper; 41.2 x 33.9; More images
Stallungen	1913; Stables	Solomon R. Guggenheim Museum, New York	Oil paint Canvas; 73.6 x 57.5; More images
Der Turm der blauen Pferde	1913; The Tower of Blue Horses	Missing since 1945	Oil paint Canvas; 200 x 130; More images
Wildschweine	1913; Wild boars	Museum Ludwig, Cologne	Oil paint Canvas; 73.5 x 57.5; More images
Kleine Komposition II	1914; Small Composition II	Sprengel Museum, Hanover	Color; Canvas; 60 x 46; More images
Kämpfende Formen	1914; Fighting forms	Neue Pinakothek, Munich	Color; Canvas; 91 x 131.5; More images
Rehe im Walde II	1914; Deer in the Forest II	Staatliche Kunsthalle, Karlsruhe	Oil paint Canvas; 110.5 x 100; More images
Spielende Formen	1914; Playing Forms	Museum Folkwang, Essen	Oil paint Canvas; 65.5 x 170; More images
Tiere in einer Landschaft	1914; Animals in a Landscape	Detroit Institute of Arts	Oil paint Canvas; 110.2 x 99.7; More images
Tirol	1914; Tyrol	Pinakothek der Moderne, Munich	Oil paint Canvas; 135.7 x 144.5; More images
Vögel	1914; Birds	Lenbachhaus, Munich	Oil paint Canvas; 109 x 100; More images
Zerbrochene Formen	1914; Broken Forms	Solomon R. Guggenheim Museum, New York City	Oil paint Canvas; 111.8 x 84.4; More images
Death in World War I	4 March 1916		

== Museums ==
- Art Institute of Chicago
- Detroit Institute of Arts
- Franz Marc Museum, Kochel
- Hamburger Kunsthalle
- Harvard Art Museums
- Kunsthalle Bremen
- Kunstmuseum Basel
- Kunstmuseum Bern
- Kunsthalle Mannheim
- Lenbachhaus, Munich
- Museum Boijmans Van Beuningen, Rotterdam
- Museum Folkwang, Essen
- Museum Kunstpalast, Düsseldorf
- Museum Ludwig, Cologne
- National Gallery of Art, Washington D.C.
- Neue Pinakothek, Munich
- Norton Simon Museum, Pasadena
- Pinakothek der Moderne, Munich
- Pushkin Museum, Moscow
- Saarland Museum, Saarbrücken
- Saint Louis Art Museum
- San Francisco Museum of Modern Art
- de:Schwabinger Kunstfund, Munich
- Solomon R. Guggenheim Museum, New York City
- Sprengel Museum, Hanover
- Staatliche Kunsthalle Karlsruhe
- Staatsgalerie Stuttgart
- Städel Museum
- The Phillips Collection, Washington D.C.
- Thyssen-Bornemisza Museum, Madrid
- Von der Heydt Museum, Wuppertal
- Walker Art Center, Minneapolis
- Westphalian State Museum of Art and Cultural History, Münster

== Media ==
- Canvas
- Cardboard
- Color
- Mural
- Oil paint
- Paper
- Plaster
- Tempera
- Wood

== See also ==
- Hut in Dachau Moors (1902)
- Indersdorf (1904)
- Two Women on the Hillside (1906)
- Horses in Landscape (1911)
- Blue Horse I (1911)
- The Large Blue Horses (1911)
- Fox (1911)
- Yellow Cow (1911)
- Little Blue Horse (1912)
- Fate of the Animals (1913)
- The Tower of Blue Horses (1913)
- The Foxes (1913)
