= Blue fox =

Blue fox or Blue Fox may refer to:

== Animals ==
- The blue morph of the Arctic fox (Vulpes lagopus)
  - Its fur
- The silver fox, a melanistic form of the red fox (Vulpes vulpes)
  - Its fur

== Arts and entertainment ==
- Blue Fox (Marc), or Fox, a 1911 painting by Franz Marc
- The Blue Fox (1921 film), an American serial
- The Blue Fox (1938 film), a German comedy
- The Blue Fox (novel), a 2003 novel by Sjón
- Blue Fox Entertainment, an American film distributor
- Blue Fox, a 1984 Enix home computer game
- Blue fox, a type of fictional animal in the TV series The Animals of Farthing Wood

== Sports ==
- Herning Blue Fox, a Danish ice hockey team
- Blue Fox, a Finnish women's floorball club in the F-liiga

== Other uses ==
- Blue Fox Theatre, a historic cinema in Grangeville, Idaho, US
- Ferranti Blue Fox, an airborne radar used in the BAe Sea Harrier
- Blue Fox (nuclear weapon), a British Rainbow Code project
- The Blue Fox, one of the "blue" pubs and inns in Grantham, England
