= Kurt Grawi =

Jewish investment banker

Kurt Grawi (born February 1, 1887, in Hannover; d. 1945 in Santiago, Chile) was a German Jewish businessman and art collector who was persecuted by the Nazis.

== Early life ==
Grawi was born in 1887, the child of Josef Grawi (b. October 18, 1851) and Berta Grawi. He had three sisters: Margarete Then-Bergh; Dr. Erna Gertrud Grawi and Irma Neumann.

He married Else Emilie Katherina Grawi (b. September 5, 1894 in Germany; d. September 5, 1944 in Santiago, Chile).

== Art collector ==
In 1928, Grawi purchased The Foxes by Franz Marc.

== Nazi persecution ==
After the Nazis came to power in Germany in 1933, Grawi was persecuted because he was Jewish. His business was Aryanized, that is, transferred in accordance with anti-semitic Nazi laws to non-Jewish owners, in 1935. In 1938, on Kristallnacht Grawi was arrested and imprisoned at the Sachsenhausen concentration camp. He fled to Chile in 1939.

== Restitution claim for The Foxes ==
In 2017, Grawi's family demanded the restitution of Marc's painting The Foxes (1913) from Düsseldorf's Kunstpalast. After Grawi's arrest on Kristallnacht and detention in the Sachsenhausen concentration camp in 1938, he had fled Germany for Chile in 1939. The painting passed through Galerie Nierendorf, and William and Charlotte Dieterle, according to the German Lost Art Foundation. Sold in New York to fund Grawi's escape from Nazi Germany, the sale was considered to have been made under duress. In 2021, the German Advisory Commission recommended that the city of Düsseldorf restitute the painting to Grawi's heirs and the Düsseldorf City Council voted in a closed session to restitute the painting.

In January 2022, after hesitations and delays that attracted criticism, Düsseldorf restituted Marc's The Foxes ("Die Füchse") to the Grawi heirs.
