= Hut in Dachau Moors =

Painting by Franz Marc

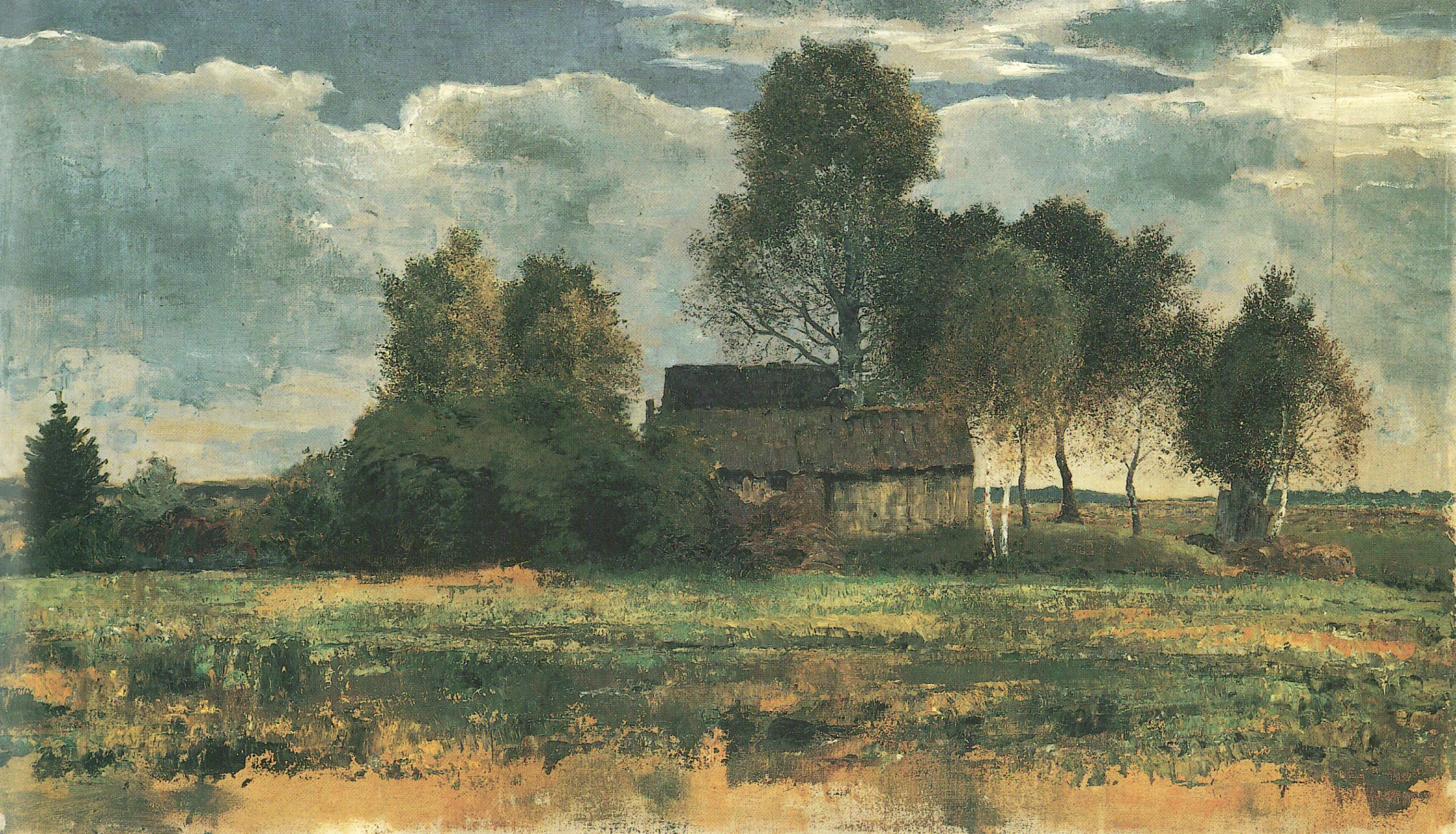
- Artist: Franz Marc
- Year: 1902
- Medium: Oil on canvas
- Dimensions: 43.5 cm × 73.6 cm (17.1 in × 29.0 in)
- Location: Franz Marc Museum; Kochel am See

Hut in Dachau Moors is an oil on canvas painting by Franz Marc, executed in 1902. It is one of the painter's earliest known paintings and is part of the collection of the Franz Marc Museum, in Kochel am See.

== History ==
The painting was created in 1902 and thus comes from the time when Franz Marc studied painting at the Academy of Arts in Munich with Gabriel von Hackl (1843–1926) and Wilhelm von Diez (1839–1907). Through this, Marc received a solid basic education in the 19th century style of painting, but did not come into contact with newer art movements. Thus this picture, like others made in the same year, is entirely in the tradition of the Munich School.

== Description ==
The lower half of the picture shows the landscape of the Dachau Moors, while the upper half is dominated by a cloudy sky. In the center of the picture stands a moor hut in the middle of a grove of trees.

The picture is dominated by dark browns and greens, with which the blue of the sky and ocher-colored areas in the foreground contrast. Details such as the individual leaves of the trees are meticulously executed with fine brushstrokes.

== See also ==
- List of works by Franz Marc
