= Luis Jiménez (sculptor) =

American sculptor (1940–2006)

Luis A. Jiménez Jr.
- Born: July 30, 1940; El Paso, Texas, U.S.
- Died: June 13, 2006 (aged 65); Hondo, New Mexico, U.S.
- Cause of death: Blood loss from an artery severed when a piece of Blue Mustang fell on him
- Education: University of Texas
- Known for: Fiberglass sculpture, prints
- Spouse: Susan Jimenez

Luis Alfonso Jiménez Jr. (July 30, 1940 – June 13, 2006) was an American sculptor and graphic artist of Mexican descent who identified as a Chicano. He was known for portraying Mexican, Southwestern, Hispanic-American, and general themes in his public commissions, some of which are site specific. The most famous of these is Blue Mustang. Jiménez died from an industrial accident that took place during its fabrication. It was commissioned by the Denver International Airport and completed after his death.

His most extensive exhibition, a retrospective called Luis Jiménez: Man on Fire, which had 331 works, opened at The Albuquerque Museum in New Mexico in 1994. It was subsequently seen at the Smithsonian American Art Museum in Washington, D.C. Luis Jiménez: Working Class Heroes: Images from a Popular Culture, another large exhibition, opened at The Dallas Museum of Art in 1997, from where it traveled to other national venues.

== Education ==
Born in El Paso, Texas, Jiménez worked at a neon sign studio, which was eventually bought by his father. Commencing at a young age, he was introduced to commercial processes, including work on fiberglass bodied cars. At the time, these works were not regarded as art. In his own professional artistic practice, Jimenez, who did not differentiate between high and low art, utilized commercial processes, materials, and finishes, which provoked the ire of art critics.

Jiménez studied art and architecture at the University of Texas in Austin and El Paso, earning a bachelor's degree in 1964. When he changed his major from architecture to art, his father did not speak to him for several years. He completing his post-graduate work at Ciudad Universitaria, Mexico City, D.F., then spent a year teaching in the El Paso school district.

Jiménez moved to New York City in 1966. He also learned much while serving as an assistant to sculptor Seymour Lipton, who he said taught him the professional aspects of being an artist, and who was influential in his use of symbols.

Jiménez won recognition as an accomplished artist and taught art at the University of Arizona and later the University of Houston.

== New York City, Roswell, Hondo ==
When Jiménez could not find representation in New York City in 1969, he "devised the guerrilla strategy of occupying a gallery" by installing three of his sculptures without authorization at the Leo Castelli Gallery. They caught the eye of director Ivan Karp, who successfully recommended the Graham Gallery. By the time of his second exhibition at the Graham Gallery, he was successful enough to become a full-time artist, though he decided to move back to Texas in order to make larger works and reach an audience that was broader than that of the gallery and museum.

The critical development in his career came in 1972, when he drove to Roswell, NM with his relatively small, completed sculptures. Jiménez had received no response from Don Anderson, founder of The Roswell Artist-In-Residence Program, to which he had applied, so he drove to Anderson's home. Though Anderson had rejected Jiménez's work when he had reviewed it in reproduction, he was impressed when he saw it in person. Anderson underwrote Jiménez's work at Roswell for six years, enabling him to create his large-scale sculptures. The enormous resources necessary for this work is evident when one considers that the sculpture Progress I required 50 individual molds. With Anderson's support, Jiménez was able to become a public artist. Jiménez, in turn, repaid Anderson with art.

After his one-person show at the Contemporary Arts Museum in Houston in 1974, Jiménez found an abandoned, former schoolhouse, made of adobe, that had been built by the Works Progress Administration. He transformed it into a home and studio. It was in this studio that he suffered the injury that caused his death.

== Critical reception ==
Hilton Kramer's short review in the New York Times of Jiménez's second show at the Graham Gallery in 1970 significantly advanced the artist's career. Kramer called it "a rather dazzling event... and it establishes him as an artist of remarkable vitality." He added: "There is an animal heat and an erotic energy in his work—in the drawings as well as in the large polychrome‐molded sculptures in fiberglass and epoxy—that fill the gallery in a way that few exhibitions do nowadays." Kramer found its "general spirit" to be "open, robust, and unrestrained."

Critic and curator Lucy Lippard wrote: “Like lava, the gleaming bulk of his work seems caught in the act of flowing, like time or history itself, embodying an exuberance and even excess that is most certainly foreign to postmodern art.” Lippard also observed: “Thanks to its own overwhelming provincialism, New York has hardly ever been sympathetic to regionalism. It took a practiced and maverick eye like Ivan Karp’s in the late ‘60s to see exactly how far out New York could focus and to recognize Jiménez’ Rabelaisian populism as a cousin to Pop art, perhaps even a distant relation to Jackson Pollock’s abstract cowboy esthetic.”

As a product of "both high and popular art," critic Michael Ennis says "Jimenez’s figures combine the classical lines and rapturous Baroque energy of a Bernini with the pneumatic surrealism of Mexican calendar art—a potent mix derived from his own cultural hybridism." Unperturbed by criticism, Jimenez, says Ennis, "simply goes on showing us the true faces of the West—and rewriting nineteenth-century Western mythology for a twenty-first-century audience."

Author Rudolfo Anaya said this of Jimenez: "The kind of medium he used shocked the art world at first. It was called outlandish and garish, but it spoke not only to Hispanics but to the world. In the coming years there will be a school of Luis Jimenez art." On the day of his death, gallerist Adair Margo declared: “I think Luis shared this border region with the world. Those images will continue to live on.... he was a voice that mattered.... a man of just incredible talent, but he also had great generosity of spirit.”

Stuart Ashman, secretary of the New Mexico Department of Cultural Affairs, called Jiménez “the most important Chicano artist in the United States.” Curator and critic Ruben C. Cordova says: "Jiménez is one of the few artists since the great Mexican printmake José Guadalupe Posada who has managed to render skeletons as convincingly animate, sentient beings. Nor has any contemporary artist expressed such a resolutely medieval mindset in this endeavor." Michael Agresta calls Border Crossing "the most likely [of Jiménez's sculptures] to stand the test of time and be looked at by future generations as an emblem of our era. Its vertical, totemic composition... is simple and perfect. It captures a timeless vision of a family’s sacrifices and forward-looking hopes. The work would be powerful enough on that level alone, without the added present-day political resonances around ever-larger migrant flows and ever-greater mortality risks faced by families who pursue a better life in the U.S."

== Art ==
=== Philosophy of Art ===
While he often treated Southwestern themes, Jiménez was more interested in Edward Keinholz than Western artists such as Frederic Remington or Charles Russell. He regarded Keinholz as a Westerner and an outsider, not someone who made "cliché 'Western' art." He did, however, value writers whom he thought had a regional interest, including James Baldwin and William Faulkner, and he felt he was influenced more by writers than by artists.

In terms of artistic subjects, Jiménez says he was "particularly fascinated with sexual symbols," and he frequently depicted women in sexual contexts, often with mythic associations or references. According to Cordova, Jiménez also "cranked out slightly more sublimated female riders in a plethora of Rodeo Queens [mostly works on paper], all of whom ride high in the saddle and wield their breasts like six-shooters."

Jiménez experienced a "shock" in 1980, when he went to Italy and saw animals in ancient sculptures with sacrificial themes that he had used in Progress I. Thus themes he assumed were Mexican or American were revealed to be universal.

Jiménez compared museums to mausoleums, and he affirmed his commitment to public art. Jiménez often took considerable time to devise an appropriate object for a commission, as he did for The Sodbuster: San Isidro, in Fargo, ND. He initially wanted to create a dance piece, but learned that, as Scandinavian Lutherans, the locals did not approve of smoking, drinking, or dancing. As described by the Smithsonian website, "The piece portrays a stout man guiding an ox drawn plow that not only opens up the soil for planting but exposes buried artifacts, from potsherds to a French Canadian oxcart wheel, of former human habitation." Jiménez had discovered potsherds in his own garden, and San Isidro, the Catholic saint of farming, was a medieval Spaniard, so he is synthesizing cultures in this work.

He prefers open spaces, because he doesn't think he can compete with buildings. "Sculpture," he says, "has served for centuries as a way of humanizing urban spaces."

For Jiménez fiberglass, with its "flawless finish" was "a statement in itself, one that can incorporate color and fluid form, the sensuality that I like." He admired Alexander Calder and Julio González, whom he thought made definitive use of their materials.

=== Sculpture ===
As a sculptor, Jiménez was known for his large polychromed fiberglass sculptures, often of Southwestern and Hispanic themes. Jiménez's sculptures spread across the United States, many initially outdoors, due to their size. His fiberglass sculptures need periodic refurbishment if they are left outdoors for an extended period, and some have been moved indoors to protect them, including one at the University of Texas at San Antonio.

His sculptures are recognizable due to their themes and the colorful, undulating surfaces the artist employed. The finish of his sculptures had more in common with commercial products than with conventional fine art sculptures. Everyday life was a catalyst for his work, as Jiménez noted: “If I was an outsider looking at America—what would I see? What would I be looking at? It would be the strong and vibrant images that stand out, like the cowboy, not those coming out of the fine-art situation. It would be the motorcycle, the automobile; this is the important visible iconography of America....”

Jiménez's first public commission was Vaquero. He realized that the equestrian was common in the Western tradition. Jiménez notes: "So the challenge became: how can I make people look at it again and how can I do something with my material—fiberglass—that bronze can’t do; that stone can’t; that hasn’t been done before?" At the same time, Jiménez wanted to make a statement about the Spanish and Mexican origins of cowboy culture. He explicitly said he was "redefining an image and a myth," operating out of a new, aggressive spirit, rather than an old deferential one."

Man on Fire (1969) at the Smithsonian American Art Museum in 2023

When he was six years old, Jiménez spent a summer in Mexico City, where he was impressed by the scale of work by Mexican muralists, including José Clemente Orozco, David Alfaro Siqueiros, and Diego Rivera. Jiménez specifically stated that he was not very influenced by Rivera. On artistic and thematic levels, he was deeply influenced by Orozco's treatment of fire, for which Jiménez had an affinity, which the artist attributed to his own, Jungian interest in fire as a mythic substance.

Man on Fire (1960), one of Jiménez's most famous and highly regarded sculptures, was preceded by many artworks that treated the theme of fire, including molotov cocktail-throwing protesters in New York and self-immolating Buddhist monks in Vietnam. It also references Cuauhtemoc, the last Aztec Tlatoani (emperor), who was tortured by the Spanish with fire, and the indigenous Odawa resistance leader Pontiac, whose image Jiménez knew from automobile hood ornaments. Man on Fire is also a final development of the artist's man/machine hybrid theme, which began with graphic works and sculptures of a woman coupling with an automobile. Cordova calls Man on Fire a spiritual self-portrait that constitutes the summation of Jiménez's "artistic and political allegiances, convictions, and aspirations," one in which "the artist’s passion, creativity, and hunger for justice continue to illuminate us all." Cordova adds that sacrifice and defiance are key elements of the sculpture, and that its protagonist can be seen as "a formidable supernatural force, a revivified Cuauhtémoc/Pontiac/superman, a guardian of the just, perhaps even an avenger."

Jiménez was a contemporary artist whose artistic roots were in pop art, the modernism of the Mexican muralists, and the regionalism of Thomas Hart Benton and Grant Wood. Heroic sculptures were Jiménez's forte, championing the common man in his work. By working in his father's shop on neon signs and sculptures, he was brought in to contact with popular culture at the time, which also included lowrider car culture. The prints he published at Landfall Press in Chicago and at regional, artistic presses around America spread his art around the area. Brightly painted fiberglass bodywork, often accented with glitter, served as a particularly relevant artistic influence.

Jiménez made preparatory drawings, watercolors, and pastels for his sculptures, some of which were very large. Most of his sculptures were made of fiberglass, which were cast in molds, after which they were painted with multiple layers of paint and coated with epoxy. One art expert has noted, "There was no surface on any Luis Jiménez sculpture that was ever any less than six different colors, each airbrushed separately adding a slightly different tone." Jiménez would also often use flake to introduce a glittery quality often seen on lowrider cars in his paint. Jiménez also made a few bronze statues, including an unpainted Man on Fire at the McNay Art Museum in San Antonio and a patinated Howl at the Albuquerque Museum.

Jiménez depicted animals as form of critique, because he noticed that within the genre of Western art, “it seemed our whole idea of progress was wrapped up in the notion of the killing of the beast. In all its variations, it has become a trite, hackneyed image.”

=== Public Sculpture Controversies ===
Jiménez's works were often controversial. He thought what he referred to as "dialogue" was positive and healthy: “The purpose of public art is to create a dialogue.” According to Ennis, "'dialogue' has indeed attended every Jimenez installation since his first public commission,Vaquero."

Jiménez's father was an undocumented immigrant who crossed the Rio Grande from Mexico in 1922. His sometimes controversial sculpture Border Crossing, which depicts a man transporting a woman and child in an environment with reeds, addresses immigration and is explcitly dedicated to his father. In discussing this sculpture at the Blanton Museum of Art in Austin, Jiménez remarked: "I had wanted to make a piece that was dealing with the issue of the illegal alien. People talked about aliens as if they landed from outer space, as if they weren’t really people. I wanted to put a face on them: I wanted to humanize them."

In 1983, Jimenez's proposed sculpture Southwest Pietà, envisioned for Tiguex Park in Albuquerque, featured an Indian man holding a lifeless Indian woman. Criticized as “anti-Hispanic” and “anti-woman” it was ultimately rejected from that site. Characterizing the piece as a "reverse-pieta," Jiménez thought the theme went back to ancient Mesoamerican myth. He believed the problem was that he was making a "Chicano statement," and that it was too Mexican for the New Mexican ruling class, who saw themselves as Spanish and of a higher class standing.

Jiménez's Progress II, proposed for Scottsdale, Arizona, "was shot down after concerted lobbying by the city’s traditional Western art galleries."

Vaquero, which Jimenez modeled in 1980 and cast in 1990, features a Mexican horse-riding vaquero waving a pistol in the air. It was initially proposed adjacent to City Hall. “I wanted to do a cowboy for Texas,” Jiménez explained, “and it’s a historical fact that the American cowboy was a Mexican invention.” According to Ennis, "the gunslinging Hispanic broncbuster was promptly attacked by a local Hispanic politician for allegedly inciting violence." It was ultimately placed in Houston's Moody Park, in a Hispanic neighborhood, where the community came to support the statue, which is still in place.

When Fiesta Jarabe (1992–1996) was installed at the University of New Mexico in 1996, it was criticized as ugly and inelegant. David Craven, then an Art History Professor at the university, wrote a defense of it in the The Albuquerque Tribune. He wrote that the sculpture's strengths "stand as ringing rebuttals to the facile charges of ‘ugliness’ and undue ‘earthiness’ that have emanated from various quarters and that are clearly based on some more mainstream and excessively sublimated concept of beauty.”

Blue Mustang has been controversial. Some think the horse's red eyes are demonic, and that it is cursed because it caused the death of the artist. The sculpture is in part an homage to the 20-foot high horse's head with lighted eyes that Jiménez helped to build in his father's shop when he was 16 years old. The family referred to these big projects as "spectaculars."

=== Graphic Works ===
In addition to sculpture, Jiménez also created watercolors, black-and-white and color lithographs, and color drawings in pencil, pastel, and oil stick. His ideas evolved in sketches and drawings, that he later refined into sculptures or more formal large-scale drawings or prints. Themes included the U.S.-Mexican border and immigration, Southwestern dance scenes, low riders, the statue of liberty, the man/machine series, and depictions of animals. In a symbolically significant, large-scale pastel that post-dated his Border Crossing sculpture by a year, Jiménez "added halos to the figures, underscoring the association with the traditional religious imagery of the Holy Family’s flight into Egypt."

Jiménez created many scenes with skeletal imagery, especially black-and-white lithographs that reflect his study of Posada as well as medieval European imagery that followed the Black Death. They are frequently utilized during Day of the Dead celebrations. The most famous of these is a large lithograph from 1984 called Baile con la Talaca (Dance with death), which shows the artist dancing with a skeleton. Cordova calls it "a strange admixture of macabre medieval moralizing, Posadaesque humor, and Southwestern fiesta.” He notes that the dancers are opposites: the woman is "in twisting, frenzied motion," the man "stiffly upright." That's because, due to his strict Methodist upbringing, Jiménez himself never learned how to dance. Furthermore, the torsion in the woman's arm is compared to a "sprung bow," and "above all it is her agitated skirt that conveys the uniqueness of this dance of death. Like a trick lasso, its dancing, serpentine line encircles and captures 'the damned artist, implying a final climax of frenzied motion.' Death— as an irresistible force—has rarely been pictured so well."

The largest collection of Jiménez's art is in the Anderson Museum of Contemporary Art in Roswell, which has many sculptures and graphic works by the artist. It houses art from the fellows of the Roswell Artist-in-Residence Program. The Smithsonian American Art Museum also has a substantial collection of both sculptures and graphic works. Another large collection is that of the Joe A. Diaz collection, which has an emphasis on graphic works.

== Health ==
As a child, Jiménez's left eye was shot by a BB gun. Surgeries corrected his vision, but he developed persistent migraines and got a glass eye later in life.

When he was a young adult teaching art at a junior high school, he was temporarily paralyzed from the chest down in a car accident.

In his later years, he had a heart attack and required hand surgery.

== Death ==
On June 13, 2006, Jiménez died in an accident at age 65 in his studio in Hondo, New Mexico, when a large section of his 32-foot-high work Blue Mustang, intended for Denver International Airport, came loose from a hoist and severed an artery in his leg.

Governor Bill Richardson ordered flags in New Mexico flown at half-staff June 15–16, 2006, in Jiménez's honor.

== Family ==
Jiménez's daughter Elisa is a multimedia artist and fashion designer and was a contestant on season four of Bravo's reality television series Project Runway.

== Awards ==
- 1999, Southwest Pieta sculpture designated a U.S. National Treasure
- 1998, Texas Artist of the Year, Houston Art League
- 1998, Distinguished Alumni award from the University of Texas, Austin
- 1998, Goodwill Ambassador, City of Houston
- 1998, Smithsonian American Art Museum's Save Outdoor Sculpture Preservation Award
- 1995, Award of Distinction, National Council of Art Administrators
- 1993, New Mexico Governor's Awards for Excellence in the Arts
- 1993, Goodwill Ambassador, City of Houston
- 1991, Grantee, Fund for American Culture
- 1991, Distinguished Alumnus, University of Texas
- 1991, Fund for American Culture
- 1990, National Endowment for the Arts Residency Fellow
- 1990, La Napoule Art Foundation Award
- 1989, Showhegan Sculpture Award
- 1987-88, Fellow, National Endowment for the Arts
- 1987, Greenburger Foundation Award
- 1985, Awards in Visual Arts
- 1979, American Academy in Rome Award
- 1977, Hassam Fund Award, American Academy of Arts and Letters
- 1972, Steuben Glass Award

== Works ==
- Man on Fire, Smithsonian American Art Museum, Washington DC, 1969
- Progress I, Albuquerque Museum, New Mexico, 1974
- Progress II, Blanton Museum of Art, Austin, Texas, 1976
- Vaquero, Moody Park, Houston, Texas, 1980
- Sodbuster, Wichita State university as part of the Ulrich Museum of art outdoor sculpture collection, 1980–81
- Honky Tonk, Wichita State University as part of the Ulrich Museum, 1981
- Southwest Pieta, Longfellow Park, Albuquerque, New Mexico, 1983 (declared a national treasure by President Bill Clinton in 1999)
- Howl, Albuquerque Museum, New Mexico and Ulrich Museum of Art, Wichita State University, 1986
- Border Crossing/Cruzando el Rio Bravo, Santa Fe, New Mexico, Los Angeles, California, and Blanton Museum of Art, Austin, Texas, 1989
- Steelworker, Birmingham Museum of Art, Birmingham, Alabama, 1990
- Los Lagartos, Downtown, El Paso, Texas, 1993
- Fiesta Jarabe, University of New Mexico, Albuquerque, New Mexico, 1996
- Assyrian Lion, Kalamazoo Institute of Arts, Kalamazoo, Michigan 2004
- Cleveland Fallen Firefighters Memorial, Cleveland, OH, 2006
- Blue Mustang, Denver International Airport, Denver, Colorado, 2008

== Collections ==
- Albuquerque Museum, Albuquerque, New Mexico
- Anderson Museum of Contemporary Art, Roswell, New Mexico
- Arizona State University, Nelson Fine Arts Center Tempe, Arizona
- Art Museum of Southeast Texas Beaumont, Texas
- Jack S. Blanton Museum of Art, Austin, Texas
- Crystal Bridges Museum of American Art, Bentonville, AR
- Chazen Museum of Art, Madison, Wisconsin
- El Paso Museum of Art, El Paso, Texas
- Iowa State University, College of Family and Consumer Sciences, Ames, Iowa
- Kemper Museum of Contemporary Art, Kansas City, Missouri
- Long Beach Museum of Art, Long Beach, California
- Harry Reid International Airport, Las Vegas, Nevada
- New Mexico Museum of Art, Santa Fe, New Mexico
- Plains Art Museum, Fargo, North Dakota
- Roswell Museum and Art Center, Roswell, New Mexico
- Saint Louis University, St. Louis University Museum of Art, Saint Louis, Missouri
- Smithsonian American Art Museum, Washington, D.C.
- University of Arizona, Museum of Art, Tucson, Arizona
- University of Kansas, Helen Foresman Spencer Museum of Art, Lawrence, Kansas
- University of Oklahoma, Fred Jones Jr. Museum of Art, Norman, Oklahoma
- University of New Mexico, Albuquerque, New Mexico
- University of Texas at El Paso, Library, El Paso, Texas
- University of Texas at San Antonio, San Antonio, Texas
- Utah Valley University, Woodbury Art Museum Orem, Utah
- Valley National Bank of Arizona, Fine Arts Department, Phoenix, Arizona
- Wichita State University, Edwin A. Ulrich Museum of Art, Wichita, Kansas
- Spencer Museum of Art, Lawrence, Kansas
- Frost Art Museum, Miami, FL
- The Grace Museum, Abilene, Texas
- Mcnay Museum of Art, San Antonio, TX
- Ellen Noël Art Museum, Odessa, Texas
- The Sculpture Collection, Santa Monica, CA
- Otis College of Art and Design, Los Angeles
- Colorado Springs Fine Arts Center, Colorado Springs, CO
- Numerous private collections

== See also ==
- History of the Mexican-Americans in Texas
