= Fox (Marc) =

Painting by Franz Marc

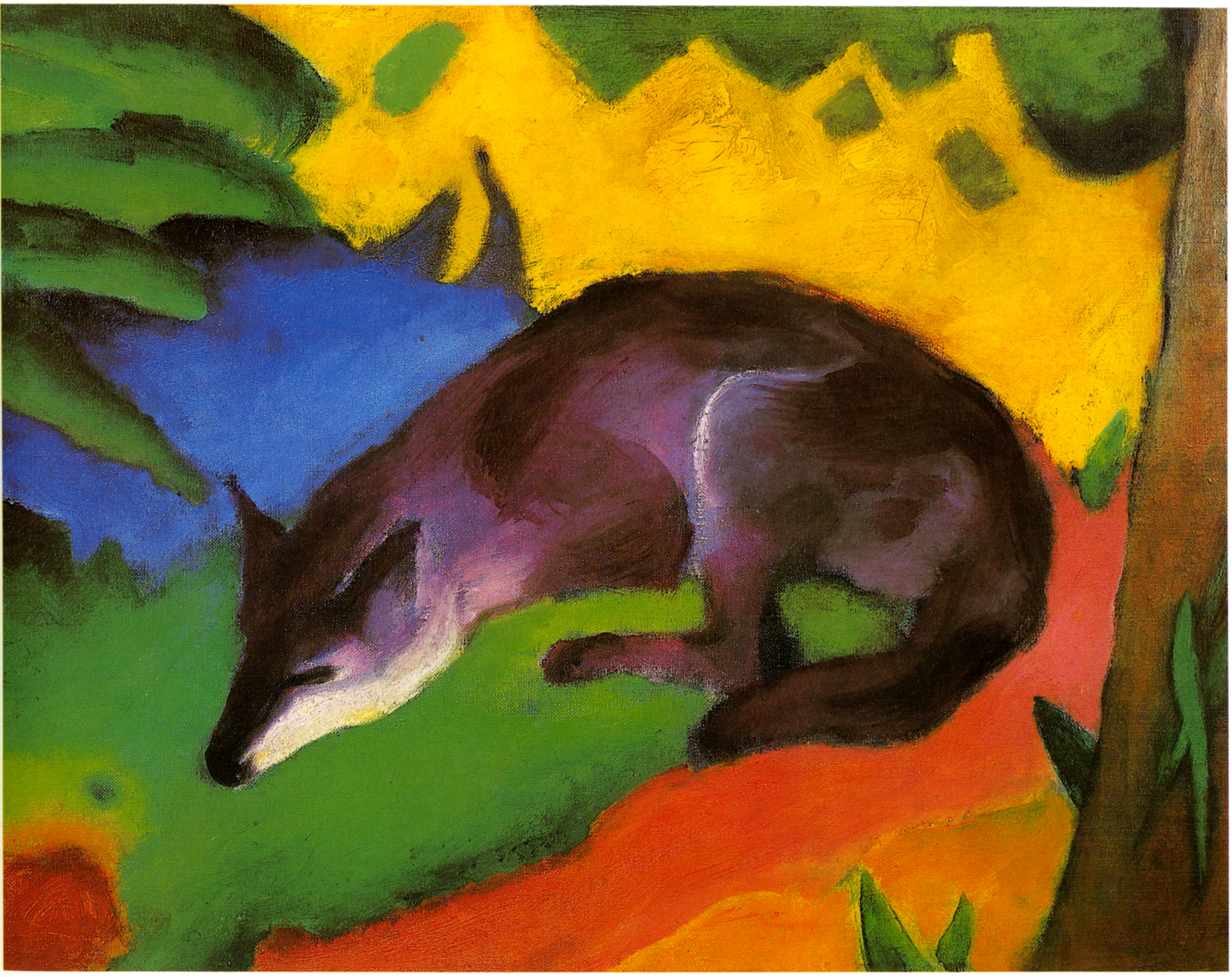
- Artist: Franz Marc
- Year: 1911
- Medium: Oil on canvas
- Dimensions: 50 cm × 63.5 cm (20 in × 25.0 in)
- Location: Von der Heydt Museum, Wuppertal

Fox, also known as Blue and Black Fox or Blue Fox, is an oil on canvas painting by Franz Marc, from 1911. It is part of the collection of the Von der Heydt Museum in Wuppertal.

== Background ==
The painting was created in July 1911 in fellow painter August Macke's studio in Bonn, when Marc was returning from a trip to England. A few months later, on December 18, 1911, the exhibition group Der Blaue Reiter, founded by Franz Marc and Wassily Kandinsky, had its first exhibition, in Munich. Marc quickly created Fox, together with the work Red Dog. The Fox was offered to the curator of the Barmer Kunstverein, Richart Reiche, who was exhibiting Marc's works. Reiche was able to find a buyer for the Red Dog. These two paintings belong to his early group of animal representations in which pure colors were used, in the function of symbols or the so-called essential colors. With the colors red / yellow / blue (primary colors) and orange / green / violet (secondary colors), Marc used the system of spectral colors as a basis in this painting.

Marc lived in rural Germany—Sindelsdorf—where foxes where common sightings; this is thought to have influenced his painting to include animals, namely foxes and easy-access to models of said animals. Marc thought that animals had a special quality of being innocent. The painting was made in Bonn as Marc traveled to Bavaria from England.

In the period before the First World War, Marc often painted foxes. Among them is the painting The Foxes (1913), in the Museum Kunstpalast in Düsseldorf, in a Cubist inspired style, in which he had further developed abstraction compared to earlier works.

== Description ==
The Fox depicts in the central position a fox with blue hues; the fox is lying on the ground, in a half-curled pose, turned to the left and under a tree. The tree trunk and some leaves are indicated on the right side of the painting. The strong coloring of the background as an abstract landscape with strong complementary contrasts of blue / yellow and orange / red / green is reminiscent of the after-effects of French Fauvism and its color conception on German Expressionism.

== Provenance ==
The work came into the possession of the Von der Heydt Museum in 1952 through a donation by Eduard von der Heydt from a collection that his father August von der Heydt had started.

== See also ==
- List of works by Franz Marc
