= Fate of the Animals =

Painting by Franz Marc

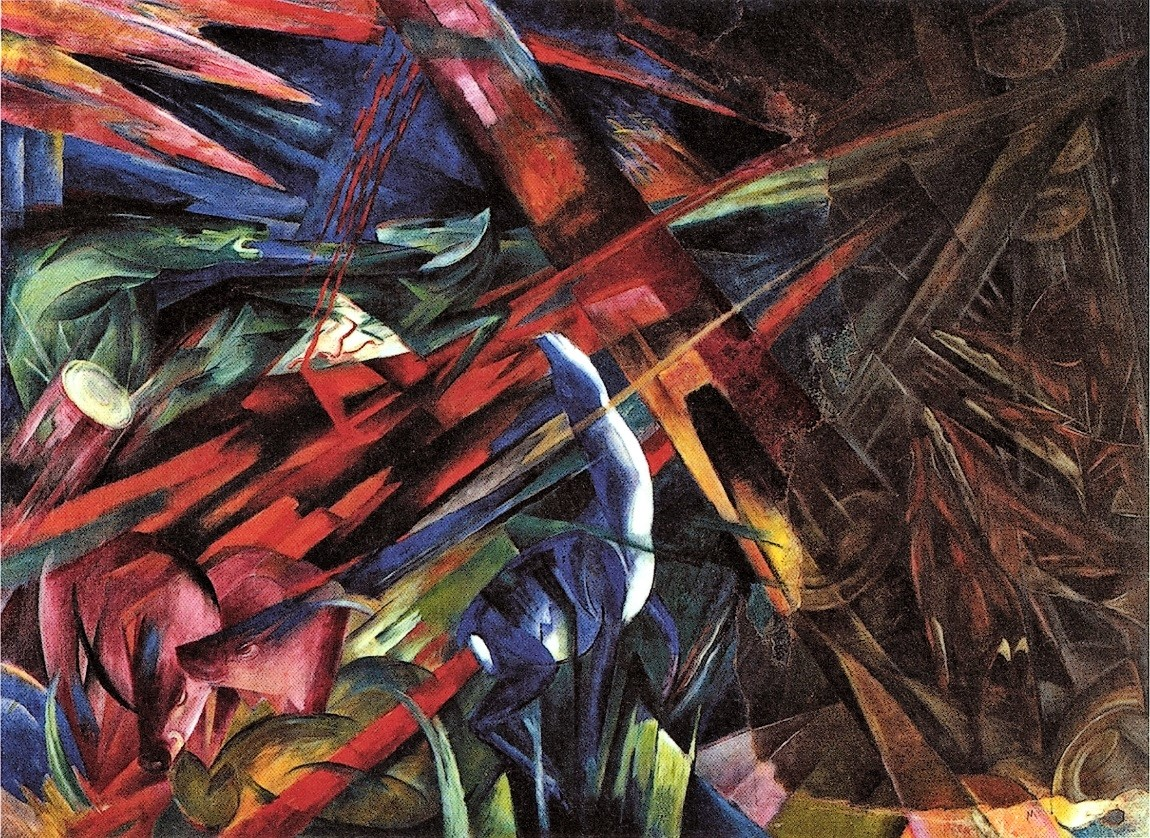
- Artist: Franz Marc
- Year: 1913
- Medium: Oil on canvas
- Dimensions: 195 cm × 268 cm (77 in × 106 in)
- Location: Kunstmuseum Basel, Basel

Fate of the Animals is an oil on canvas painting by Franz Marc created in 1913. In contrast to most of Marc's other works, this painting presents animals in a brutal way rather than depicting them in a peaceful manner. The reasons for Marc's strong ties with animals as his subjects remain uncertain, but it is thought to stem from his childhood dog. Fate of the Animals remains one of Marc's most famous pieces and displays the Der Blaue Reiter style that he co-founded with Wassily Kandinsky. The painting currently resides in the Kunstmuseum in Basel, Switzerland.

In 1916, after Marc's death, "[t]he entire right side of the painting was burned beyond recognition." It was restored by one of his close friends, Paul Klee, who used old photographs but painted the burned section "in a kind of dull brown that mutes the colors completely." Scholars have yet to agree on why he changed the original color. Morgan Meis writes:

Probably, Klee chose to paint his section in dull brown for the obvious reason that he didn't want to produce a "forgery" as it were. He didn't want to make it seem as if he, or anyone else, was trying to fool anyone.... [The] restoration is honest about the fact that it is a restoration.... And the brown is a testimony to the fact that the painting was burned, that the color was burned out of it.

Along the same lines, Mindy Aloff, reviewing Meis's book, The Fate of the Animals, writes, "[Klee] would not pretend: The painting carries its tragic history in the open".

== Title and subject ==
The title of the work in English is Fate of the Animals, which is a translation of the German name Tierschicksale. According to Frederick S. Levine, the painting "was originally entitled The Trees Show Their Rings, The Animals Their Veins, but "Marc, acting under what appears to have been a rather strong suggestion by another of his close friends, Paul Klee, changed the title of the painting to Fate of the Animals". According to Morgan Meis, however, Paul Klee suggested to Marc the title The Trees Show Their Rings, The Animals Their Veins. It refers to the tree rings on the left as well as the green horse on the right whose veins are visible on its body. On the back of the canvas Marc wrote a phrase that translates to "And all being is flaming suffering", which is taken from the Vedas.

Fate of the Animals' title derives from the chaotic scene depicted. There are animals scattered throughout the canvas in what is referred to as a post-apocalyptic setting. The scene depicts a forest that is being destroyed by the flames that are evident all around. The painting consists of a blue deer in the middle of the canvas, two boars on the left side, two horses above the boars, and four unidentified figures on the right. The four unidentified animals are believed to be either deer, foxes, or wolves. Most scholars believe that the animals are deer based on Marc's older works where he depicts them with the same colors and physical attributes.

== Techniques ==
The painting contains only diagonal lines. The lack of horizontal and vertical lines throughout the painting along with the deep colors, create tension. This tension further highlights the chaos and violence of the animal's lives. These diagonals are emphasized in three primary ways: composition order, diagonal posture of the animals, and “the animal’s position in conformity with the diagonals." The diagonals also help with the narration by acting as fire sparks scattering across the canvas.

Marc's paintings had a reoccurring theme of colors that represented certain things. Blue would represent males and the severity and spirituality that they held. Yellow would depict females and their sensual and gentle side. Red would represent matter and the heaviness and brutality it held. Franz Marc makes use of these colors in Fate of the Animals to further his ongoing themes. The blue deer in the middle is a male that possesses spirituality. Some scholars believe that the blue deer, with his up-looking posture, should be seen as a sacrifice.

== Narration ==
A forest fire is shown with many animals in the chaos. The scene starts at the top left corner where there are three main sparks present. These sparks of fire are coming from an unknown source and will begin to ignite more of the fire and most of the animals. Under the horse there are many diagonals painted red. This is the first of the sparks to ignite the ground under the horses. The horse on the left has a face of agony and is crying out. The horse on the right is more accepting of his fate of oncoming death and looks away from the fire.

The next spark to hit is the tan line that is right across the blue deer's neck. It misses the blue deer and heads towards the boars in the bottom left of the painting. The boars are accepting their evident death from the flame. The boars are turned away from the flame coming straight towards them and they both have a sad face.

The last main spark to hit is the larger red diagonal that is behind the blue deer. Again this spark misses the deer and lands to ignite the ground behind him. The main large diagonals going across the canvas from the top middle to the bottom right is a tree. This tree is falling on the deer and his dramatic posture with his head up. It is another acceptance of fate for the animals.

The four animals on the right are the only animals that are completely safe from any harm. There are no sparks heading towards them and no trees about to fall on them. There is no certainty as to why these animals were chosen as the only beings safe from the harm of the destructive forest.

== Marc's depiction of animals ==
Along with Marc's reoccurring themes of colors, he would also depict animals in the same manner. Deer were sacred animals to Marc. He usually painted them, like most of his animals, in a very peaceful manner. His works such as Grazing Horses IV (The Red Horses), The Yellow Cow, and Dog Lying in Snow depict animals in a peaceful setting. Fate of the Animals provides a contrast to his normal depiction of animals, in which he puts his beloved animals in a scene of destruction.

The only animal to not remain consistent throughout Marc's works was horses. They ranged anywhere from sacred, aspiring, to human-like and everywhere in between. This could explain why the only animal that shows its veins is one of the horses.

== See also ==
- List of works by Franz Marc
