= Indersdorf =

Painting by Franz Marc

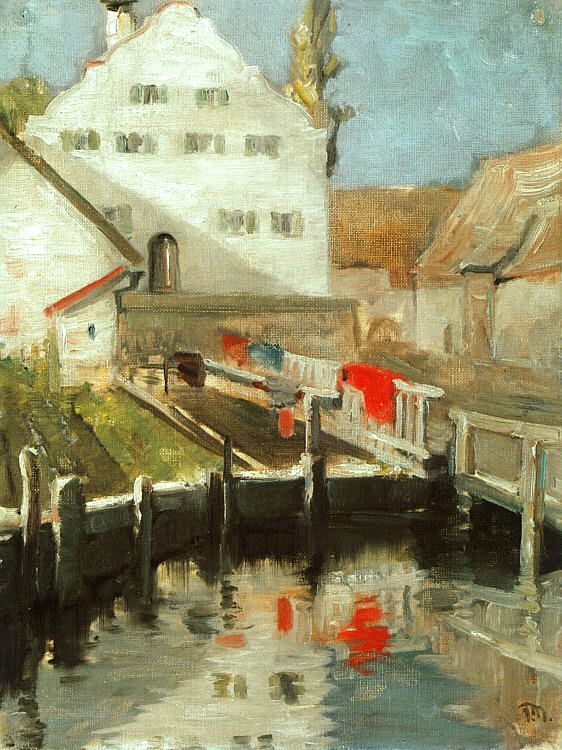
- Artist: Franz Marc
- Year: 1904
- Medium: Oil on canvas
- Dimensions: 40 cm × 31.5 cm (16 in × 12.4 in)
- Location: Städtische Galerie im Lenbachhaus; Munich

Indersdorf is an oil on canvas painting by Franz Marc executed in 1904. It is in the collection of the Städtische Galerie im Lenbachhaus in Munich.

== History ==
The painting was made in 1904 at a time when Franz Marc stayed several times in Markt Indersdorf in the Dachau district. The previous year Marc had done a trip to France where he met the work of the impressionist painters for the first time. After his return he left his studies at the Academy of Fine Arts in Munich and was now searching for his own style with lighter and stronger colors.

== Description ==
The upper half of the painting mainly shows Gasthaus zur Mühle in the village of Glonn, a district of Markt Indersdorf, and the neighboring buildings. In the foreground flows the river Glonn, over which a bridge crosses on the right edge of the picture. Elongated flower beds stretch between the inn and the river. Colorful clothes hang on a fence between the flower beds and the street. The facade of the inn, the fence and the clothes are reflected in the moving water.

It is one of the few paintings in Marc that depicts a particular locality in the landscape.

== See also ==
- List of works by Franz Marc
