= Blue Horses =

1911 painting by Franz Marc

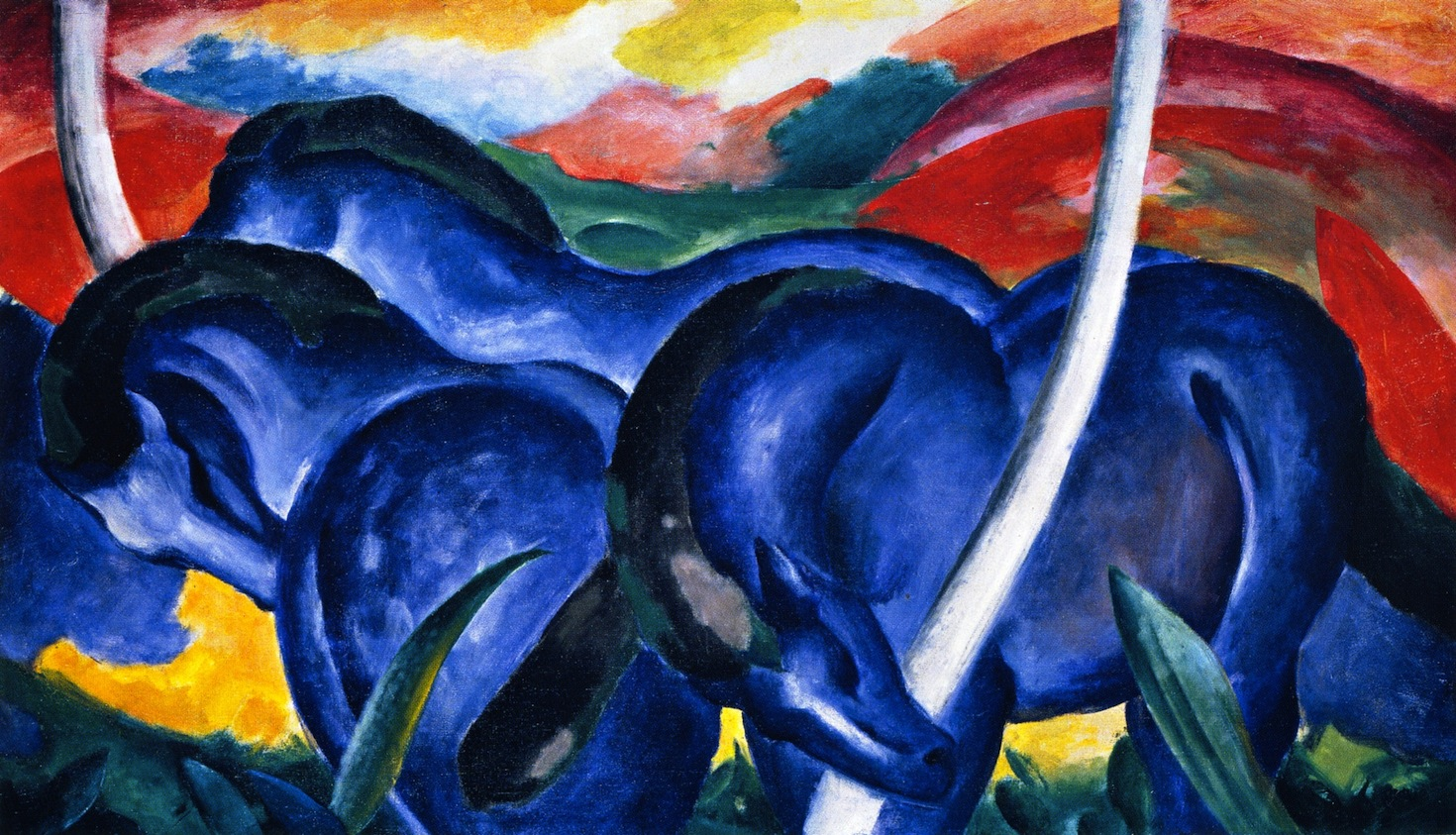
- Artist: Franz Marc
- Year: 1911
- Medium: Oil on canvas
- Dimensions: 105.7 cm × 181.2 cm (41.6 in × 71.3 in)
- Location: Walker Art Center; Minneapolis, Minnesota
- Owner: Walker Art Center, Gift of the T.B. Walker Foundation and the Gilbert M. Walker Memorial Fund, 1942.1

Blue Horses (German: Die grossen blauen Pferde) (The Large Blue Horses) is a 1911 painting by German painter and printmaker Franz Marc (1880–1916).

== Background ==
In 1911 Marc was a founding member of Der Blaue Reiter (The Blue Rider), and was the center of a circle of German and Russian expatriate artists along with August Macke, Wassily Kandinsky, and several others whose works were seminal to the development of German Expressionism.

== Analysis ==
This work, which represents three vividly coloured blue horses looking down in front of a landscape of rolling red hills, is characterized by its bright primary colors. According to the Encyclopædia Britannica, "the powerfully simplified and rounded outlines of the horses are echoed in the rhythms of the landscape background, uniting both animals and setting into a vigorous and harmonious organic whole." The curved lines Marc used to depict the subject are to emphasize "a sense of harmony, peace, and balance" in a spiritually-pure animal world; by viewing the work, human beings are allowed to join this harmony. Marc gave an emotional or psychological meaning or purpose to the colors he used in his work: blue was used for masculinity and spirituality, yellow represented feminine joy, and red encased the sound of violence and of base matter. Marc used blue throughout his career to represent spirituality; his use of vivid color is thought to have been an attempt to eschew the material world to evoke a spiritual or transcendental essence. This oil painting on canvas measures 41.625 inches by 71.3125 inches (unframed) and is unsigned.

This is one of Marc's earliest major works depicting animals and is one of the most important of his series of portraits of horses. It is often thought that Marc considered animals to be more pure and more beautiful than humans and, therefore, his paintings represent a pantheistic understanding of the divine or of spirituality.

Swiss painter Jean Bloé Niestlé (1884–1942) urged Marc to "capture the essence of the animal." According to art historian Gabi La Cava, for Marc, "the feeling that is evoked by the subject matter is most important"—more so than zoological accuracy.

== Provenance ==
In 1942, Blue Horses was purchased by the Walker Art Center in Minneapolis, Minnesota through The T. B. Walker Foundation and its Gilbert M. Walker Memorial Fund. This was the first major modernist work to enter the collection.

== In culture ==
The painting was the inspiration behind the title of a bestselling volume of poetry, Blue Horses (2014), by the American poet Mary Oliver.

== Other notable animal paintings by Franz Marc ==
- Gelbe Kuh (Yellow Cow) (1911)
- Blaues Pferd I (Blue Horse I) (1911)
- Die Kleinen Blauen Pferde (The Small Blue Horses)
- Zwei Katzen, Blau und Gelb (Two Cats, Blue and Yellow) 1911
- Blaues Pferdchen (Little Blue Horse) 1912
- Der Turm der Blauen Pferde (The Tower of Blue Horses) (1913), missing since 1945.
- Die Kleinen Gelben Pferde (The Little Yellow Horses)

== See also ==
- List of works by Franz Marc
- German Expressionism
- Horses in art
