= Otto Stangl =

German art gallery owner (b. 1915, d. 1990)

Otto Stangl (Dachau, October 9, 1915 - Munich, July 20, 1990) was a German gallery owner, art dealer and art collector. With his wife Etta Stangl they founded in 1947 in Munich the Moderne Galerie Etta und Otto Stangl, an important gallery of the avant-garde after the Second World War in Germany. Their influence on the transmission of contemporary art played an important role in the rehabilitation of the so-called degenerate art of the Third Reich (mainly Blauer Reiter, expressionism, classical modern art). Etta and Otto Stangl were also involved in establishing the Franz Marc Museum in Kochel am See, which opened in 1986.

== Gallerist ==
Otto Stangl was one of the German Gallery owners who recovered the great painters of classical modernism for an entire generation of young artists that had been deprived of these works under the National Socialists. In 1948 when Hilla von Rebay organized “Zeitgenössische Kunst und Kunstpflege in USA” (“Contemporary Art and Art Care in USA”), Otto Stangl introduced to her the first non-objective German artists. These artists, supported by Rebey and the Guggenheim Foundation, formed the important South German group Zen 49, that first appeared in June 1949 in the Munich Amerikahaus.
