= Marie Schnür =

German painter (1869–1934)

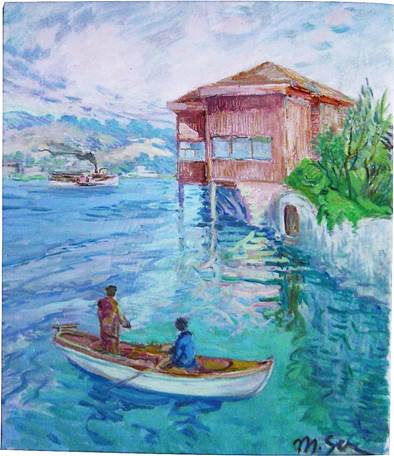
Bathhouse on an Alpine Lake, one of her few known paintings.

Marie Schnür, or Marie Marc-Schnür, (19 February 1869, Krien – 16 February 1934, Swinemünde) was a German painter, illustrator and silhouette maker. From 1907 to 1908, she was married to the painter Franz Marc.

== Biography ==
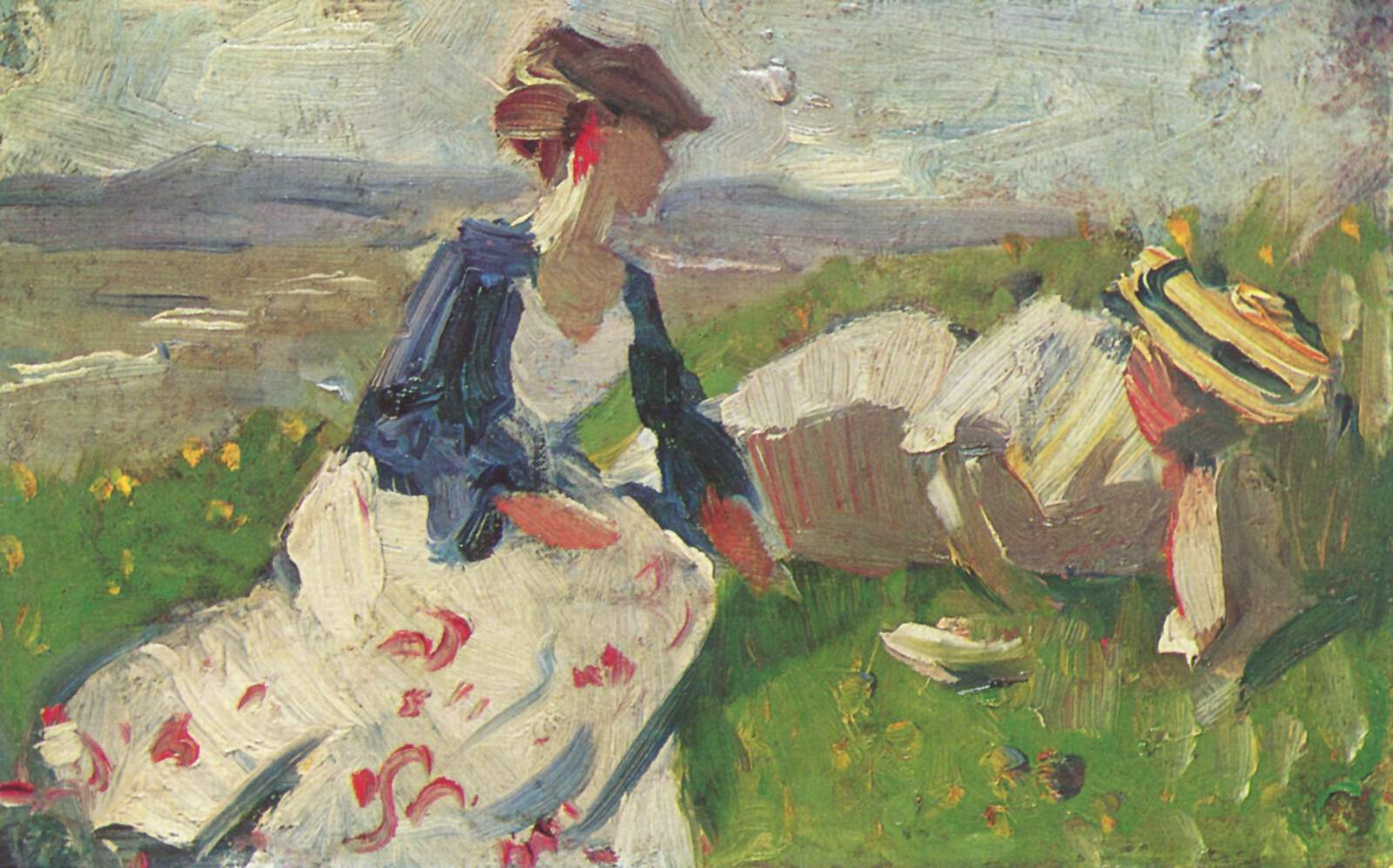
Two Women on a Hill, by Franz Marc (Marie, left, and Maria)

She was one of five daughters born to a wealthy family from Coburg, on a large estate, the garden house of which is still preserved as a historical monument. She attended the art school operated by the "Verein der Berliner Künstlerinnen" (Association of Women Artists), where her primary instructor was the sculptor Conrad Fehr. She also studied in Munich with Ludwig Schmid-Reutte and Wilhelm Dürr. After that, she became an illustrator, doing books and sheet music and working for the magazine Jugend, where her works often appeared on the front page.

Her career advanced through her friendship with the artist, Gertraud Rostosky and her participation in an art group known as "Die Scholle". She was also part of the circle around Countess Marion Kaulitz (1865-?), a maker of artistic dolls that are now rare collector's items. Schnür made several of her own that were displayed at the Warenhaus Tietz, a famous department store in Berlin.

She was also an instructor at the "Women's Academy" of the "Münchner Künstlerinnenverein", where she taught still-life painting. It was there that she met Franz Marc and Bertha Marie Franck, a student who would become Marc's second wife. They spent the summer of 1906 together, at Marc's home in Kochel am See, possibly engaged in a ménage à trois.

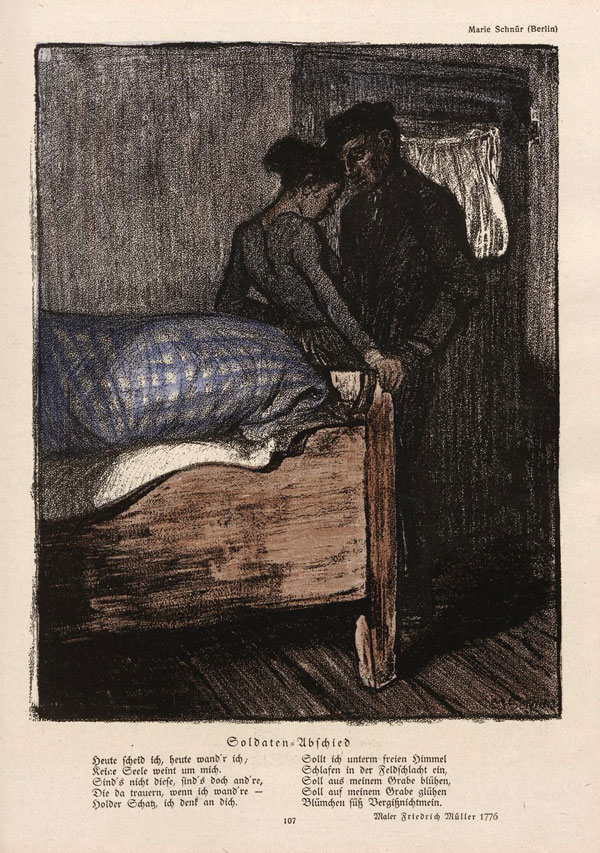
Illustration for the song lyrics, Heute scheid ich, heute wand'r ich... (1918)

Earlier that year, Schnür had secretly given birth to a son (Klaus) in Paris; probably from a relationship with the artist Angelo Jank, although some sources point to August Gallinger, a medical student who would later become known for his exposé of crimes committed against German POWs during World War I. At first, she was forced to leave Klaus with her parents in Swinemünde, but accepted an offer from Marc to enter into a marriage of convenience in 1907 so she could gain custody. After only a year, she divorced Marc, charging him with adultery, and thereby prevented him from marrying Franck until 1911, because a dispensation was required.

Not long after the divorce, she went to Swinemünde to live with her family. After that point, little is known about her, although Jugend published what may have been new artwork by her in 1916 and 1918.

== Illustrations from Jugend ==
Digitalized by the Heidelberg University Library
No.25, 1901 No.28, 1901 No.15, 1902 N0.39, 1902 No.43, 1902 No.13, 1904 No.21, 1904 No.30, 1904 N0.12, 1905 No.20, 1905
