= The Foxes (Marc) =

Painting by Franz Marc

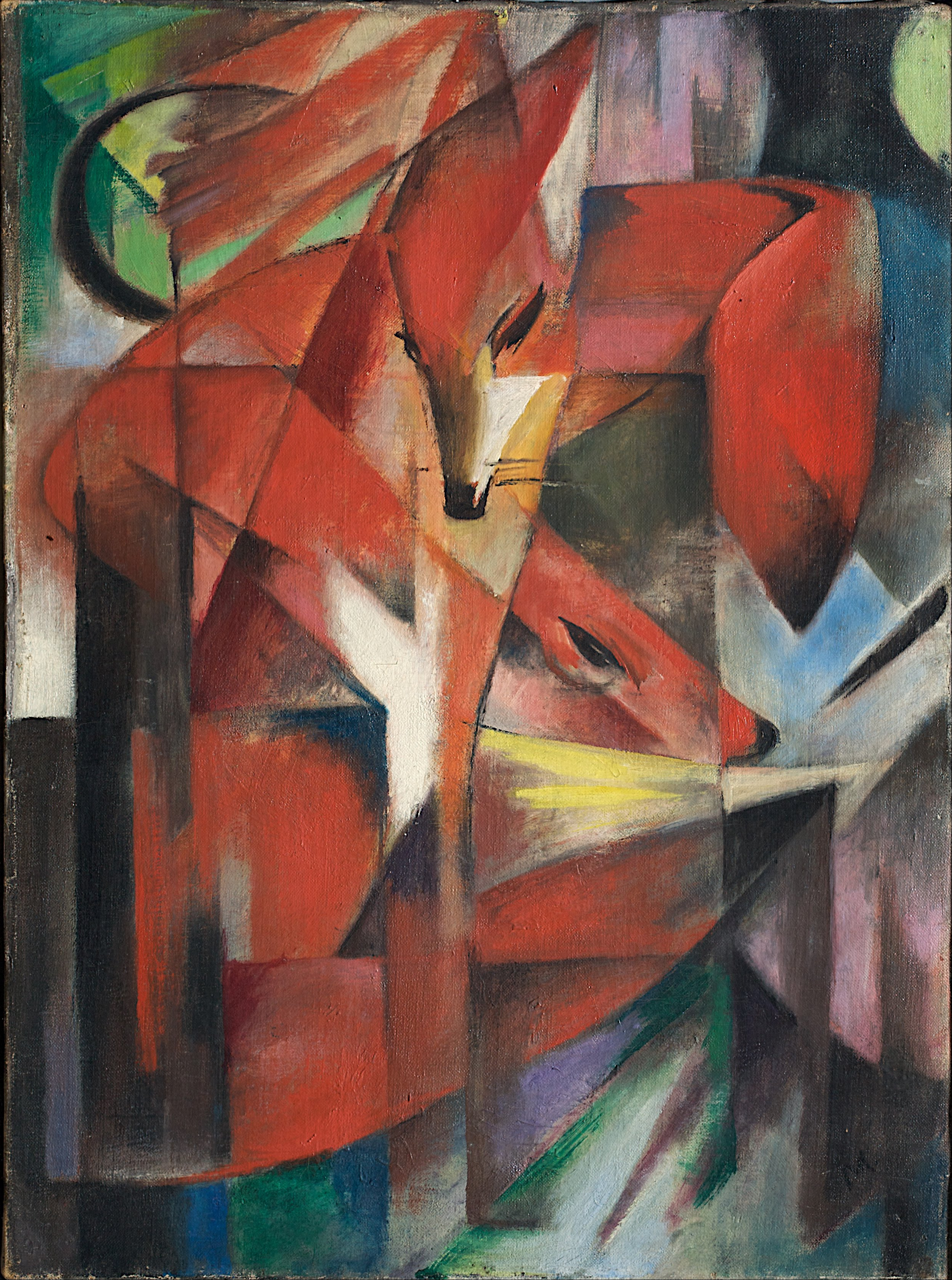
- Artist: Franz Marc
- Year: 1913
- Medium: Oil on canvas
- Dimensions: 88 cm × 66 cm (35 in × 26 in)
- Location: Private collection

The Foxes (German: Die Füchse) is a 1913 painting by German painter Franz Marc. It was held by the Museum Kunstpalast in Düsseldorf until returned to the heirs of Kurt Grawi in 2022, and sold at auction by them.

== Analysis ==
Prior to painting The Foxes in 1913, Marc was inspired by French Cubism and the Orphic works of Robert Delaunay. The Foxes reflects Marc's breakdown of the animals into abstract forms, presented in harmonized colors. The crystalline composition resembles stained glass windows in medieval churches.

== Provenance ==
Jewish investment banker Kurt Grawi purchased the painting in 1928. Following the rise of Nazi Germany, Grawi was forced to sell much of his art collection and was incarcerated in Sachsenhausen concentration camp. He was released after several weeks and escaped to Chile. Grawi still owned The Foxes, however, and sold the painting in 1940 to German-American film director William Dieterle. The painting was acquired by German businessman Helmut Horten in 1961, and he donated it to the Düsseldorf city art collections in 1962.

== Restitution ==
In 2017, the heirs of Kurt Grawi made a restitution claim for the painting. In 2021, the German advisory panel on Nazi-looted art urged the city of Düsseldorf to return the painting from the Museum Kunstpalast to the Grawi family. By then, the painting was valued between €15–€30 million.

According to Der Spiegel, however, the city of Düsseldorf did not want to restitute the painting, and while promising its return, Düsseldorf was at the same time arguing that the sale had been voluntary and that the Grawis had been able to pay the special taxes levied on Jews by Nazis implying they still had resources.

In January 2022, after months of "legal tug-of-war", Düsseldorf's Kunstpalast Museum restituted The Foxes to the Grawi heirs. Not long after, it was sold at an auction at Christie's for £42.6 million in March 2022.

== See also ==
- List of works by Franz Marc
