= Meike Hoffmann =

German art historian (born 1962)

- Education: University of Kiel; Free University of Berlin
- Scientific career
- Fields: art historian
- Workplaces: Free University of Berlin; Goethe-Institut

Meike Hoffmann (born 1962) is a German art historian and provenance researcher.

== Life ==
Hoffmann studied art history, archeology, cultural studies, and library science at the Christian-Albrechts-Universität zu Kiel and at the Freie Universität Berlin (Free University Berlin). In 2005, she was awarded a PhD for her dissertation on Die Brücke art movement.

From 1990 to 1994, Meike Hoffmann was a research assistant at the Berlin gallery Theis and the Berlin Ceramics Museum. From 1992 to 1995, she taught Art History at the Goethe-Institut in Berlin, and from 1995 to 1999, she was a research trainee and curator at the Brücke Museum in Berlin. From 1999 to 2006, she worked as a freelance art historian, writer and curator.

Since November 2006, Meike Hoffmann is in charge of the Forschungsstelle "Entartete Kunst" (Degenerate Art Research Center) at the Freie Universität Berlin. The Research Center was initiated in 2003 by the Ferdinand-Möller Stiftung, which secured the funding until 2016. Since then, the Research Center is funded by the Federal Government Commission for Culture and the Media.

In 2010, Hoffmann was involved in the identification of the missing sculptures found in the archaeological excavations at the Rotes Rathaus City Hall of Berlin. She designed the first worldwide academic training program in provenance research that she teaches continuously since 2011 at the Free University Berlin.

After the ‘Schwabinger Kunstfund’ (‘Schwabing Art Trove’) in 2012, Meike Hoffmann was commissioned to examine classic modern art within the collection of Hildebrand Gurlitt. She participated at the press conference about the Munich art discovery on 5 November 2013 in Augsburg and became an official member of the Taskforce ‘Schwabinger Kunstfund’ as well as for the follow-up projects of the Deutsches Zentrum Kulturgutverluste (German Lost Art Foundation) and the Kunstmuseum Bern (Museum of fine Arts Berne).

On 1 March 2017, Meike Hoffmann took over the scientific coordination of the ‘Mosse Art Research Initiative’ (MARI) which is also located at the Freie Universität Berlin. The project is the first public-private partnership in provenance research executed by public German institutions in cooperation with descendants of the victims of National Socialist prosecution.

== Publications ==
- Hildebrand Gurlitt and His Dealings with German Museums during the Third Reich, in: Adreas Huyssen/Anson Rabinbach/Avinoam Shalem (Ed.): Nazi-Looted Art and its Legacies, New German Critique, No 130/Feb 2017, p. 35–55.
- Outlawed – The Fate of “Degenerate Art“ after Confiscation from German Museums During the Nazi Regime, in: Modern Masters “Degenerate” Art at The Museum of Fine Arts Berne, Exhibition Catalogue, 2016, p. 103–115.
- Provenance Research on the 1913 Painting “Dünen und Meer” by Ernst Ludiwg Kirchner, in: Modern Masters “Degenerate” Art at The Museum of Fine Arts Berne, Exhibition Catalogue, 2016, p. 117–119.
- A New Challenge for an Old and Almost Forgotten Academic Discipline: Provenance Research Training at the Free University of Berlin, in: "The West" Versus "The East" or The United Europe? The different conceptions of provenance research, documentation and identification of looted cultural assets and the possibilities of international cooperation in Europe and worldwide, ed. by Mecislav Borák, Prag 2014, S. 155-166.
- On the Trail of "Degenerate Art" – Confiscation of Modernist Art conducted by the National Socialists in 1937 with Particular Mention of Szczecin, Wroclaw and Bytom, in: MUZEALNICTWO (Museumskunde), Bd. 53, Warschau November 2012, S. 58-64.
