= Yellow Cow =

1911 painting by Franz Marc

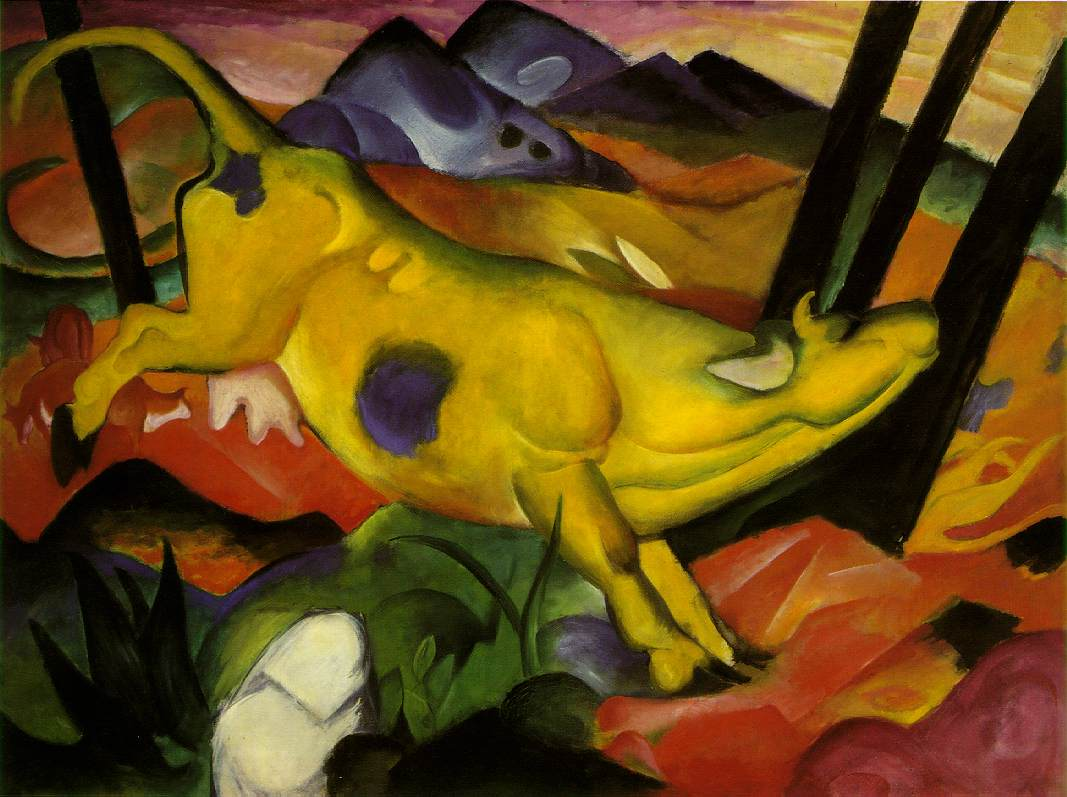
- Artist: Franz Marc
- Year: 1911
- Medium: Oil on canvas
- Dimensions: 140.5 cm × 189.2 cm (55.3 in × 74.5 in)
- Location: Solomon R. Guggenheim Museum; New York

Yellow Cow (German: Gelbe Kuh) is a painting by the German artist Franz Marc, dating to 1911. It is one of the artist's most well known works, and is one of several of his depictions of animals in Expressionist style. This work is oil on canvas and measures 140.5 x 189.2 centimeters. The central motif of the painting is a jumping cow, surrounded by a colorful, structured landscape. The painting is characterized by the contrast between the dynamic central motif and the calm background.

The painting is in the collection of the Solomon R. Guggenheim Foundation and has been shown at the Solomon R. Guggenheim Museum in New York.

== Colour ==
Yellow Cow dates to Marc's formative phase, during which he developed the Farbsymbolik (colour symbolism) that permeates the painting. For Marc, blue was equated with spirituality and maleness, yellow with femininity and sensuality, and red with the earth. The colours in the painting should therefore not be taken as naturalistic, but rather, as symbolically representing the sense of the objects in the work.

Marc's use of colour (in this work and others) was greatly influenced by the Russian painter Wassily Kandinsky.

== Interpretations ==
According to art historian Mark Rosenthal, Yellow Cow can be seen as a veiled depiction of Marc's wife, Maria Franck, whom he married the same year the painting was created.

== See also ==
- List of works by Franz Marc
