= Little Blue Horse =

Painting by Franz Marc

- Blaues Pferdchen (German)
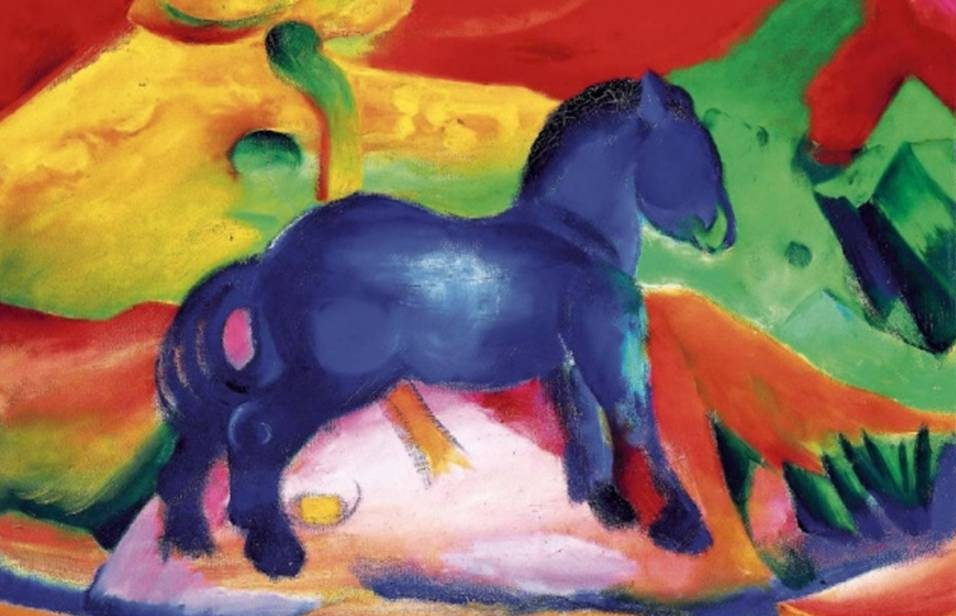
- Artist: Franz Marc
- Year: 1912
- Medium: Oil on canvas
- Dimensions: 57.5 cm × 73 cm (22.6 in × 29 in)
- Location: Saarland Museum, Saarbrücken

Little Blue Horse is an oil on canvas painting by German Expressionist painter Franz Marc, from 1912. it is held in the Saarland Museum, in Saarbrücken.

== Description ==
The painting has the dimensions of 57.5 x 73 centimeters. It is in the collection of the Saarland Museum, in Saarbrücken. The picture depicts a young horse in the foreground, standing with its legs in a balanced position. There is a small stream at his side, and behind the horse, we can see a flowering plant in front of a mountainous landscape. The horse has a blue color, while the mountains and the sky alternate between the red, yellow, blue and orange colours.

== Provenance ==
Marc made the painting for Walterchen, the son of his friend and colleague August Macke, a fact that the inscription at his top right demonstrates. In 1956, the museum director Rudolf Bornschein acquired the painting for the Saarbrücker Stadt-und Heimatmuseum, which in 1968 merged with the Moderne Galerie. Little Blue Horse is one of the Saarbrücker Sammlung's most famous works.

== See also ==
- List of works by Franz Marc
- Blue Horses

== Sources ==
- Heather Alexander (20 May 2014). A Child's Introduction to Art: The World's Greatest Paintings and Sculptures. Hachette Books. pp. 81–. ISBN 978-1-57912-956-9.
