= Franz Marc Museum =

Museum in Bavaria, Germany

Coordinates: 47°39′02″N 11°21′55″E

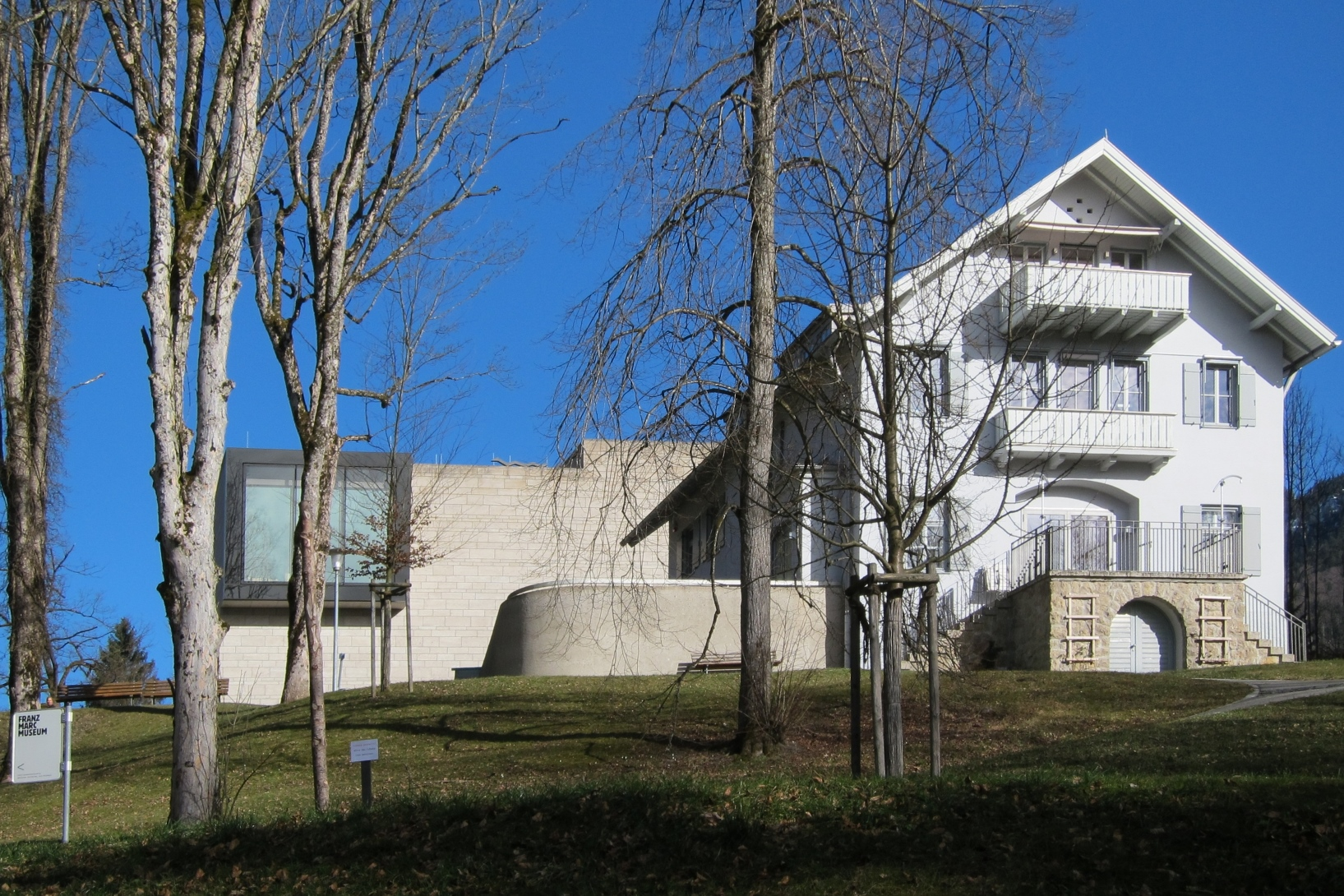
Franz Marc Museum with extension (to the left)

The Franz Marc Museum is a museum located in Kochel am See, Upper Bavaria, dedicated to German Expressionist painter Franz Marc. The museum shows paintings by Franz Marc, and also works of art of his contemporaries and other important artists of the 20th century, in a permanent and in temporary exhibitions.

== History ==
The Franz Marc Museum is a private institution, which was founded in 1986 to present the life and work of Marc, one of the most important artists of Bavaria in the 20th century, in the place where he lived and which gave him so much inspiration.

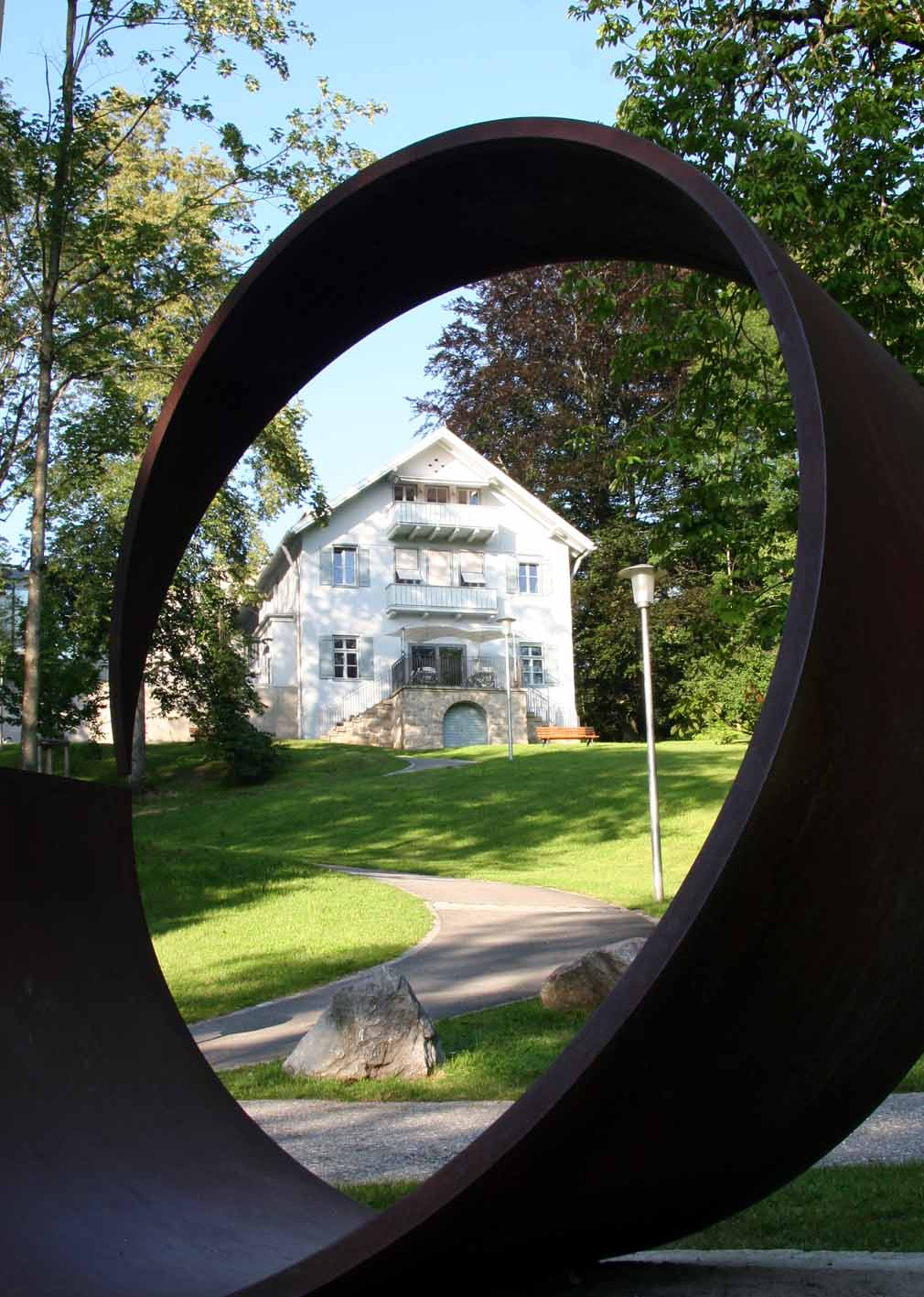
Franz Marc Museum original building

The museum exhibits 2000 works, including more than 150 works from the estate of Franz Marc, which are complemented with various loans. It also holds many of his personal items and written documents, as well works of art by some of his contemporary artists, such as Paul Klee, Wassily Kandinsky, Max Pechstein, Erich Heckel, Max Beckmann, Gabriele Münter and Alexej von Jawlensky. The exhibition illustrates the influence of Franz Marc and his colleagues of the Expressionist group Der Blaue Reiter in contemporary art.

In 2008, a new building was inaugurated, having been designed by Swiss architects Diethelm & Spillmann, and it opened up new possibilities for the museum's conception. It extended the exhibition space by around 700 m2, so that Marc's work could be put in the context of the 20th century art. Especially after the addition to the Franz Marc Bequest and the Franz Marc Foundation of the collection of the Etta and Otto Stangl Foundation, it became possible to showcase the work of Marc with the some of his other contemporaries, such as from the artists from the other German Expressionist group Die Brücke, and also post-World War II German and French artists, like Joseph Beuys, Per Kirkeby and Georg Baselitz.

The museum continuously changes the displays of the collection, which provides new insights about Marc's work and his influence in German contemporary art.

On the occasion of the 100th anniversary of the artist's death, on 4 March 2016, the museum dedicated him an exhibition trilogy, under the collective title "Franz Marc - Between Utopia and Apocalypse" (Franz Marc – Zwischen Utopie und Apokalypse), each one called, respectively, "The Poor Country of Tirol", "Grazing Horses" and "Fighting Forms". The museum also holds periodically exhibitions dedicated to contemporary artists. It inaugurated recently the exhibition "Blauer Reiter-Das Moment der Abstraktion", dedicated to the Blaue Reiter artists and how they paved the way to abstractionism.

The Franz Marc Museum is part of the MuSeen Landscape Expressionism (MuSeenLandschaft Expressionismus), in Germany, together with the Museum der Phantasie ("Buchheim Museum"), in Bernried am Starnberger See, the Museum Penzberg, the Schloßmuseum Murnau (Castle Museum Murnau), and the Municipal Gallery Lenbachhaus, in Munich.

== Friends of the Franz Marc Museum ==
The Friends of the Franz Marc Museum is an association that sponsors exhibitions on Franz Marc, artists of Der Blaue Reiter or Die Brücke, as well as on abstract art of the 20th century, especially German post-World War II art. Their commitment enables them to buy works of art to supplement the collections of the Franz Marc Museum. They also support the development of new placement services to promote understanding of art and to show their contexts and backgrounds. In addition, they facilitate series of talks, events and symposia, scientific conferences on 20th-century art and cultural history, and publications documenting these events or presenting new research results. They also promote cultural events such as readings or concerts and support placement services for non-educated sections of the population and young people.

== Works ==
Some of the best known works of the museum are:

- Franz Marc, Hut in Dachau Moors (German: Moorhütten im Dachauer Moos), 1902
- Franz Marc, Kleine Pferdestudie II, 1905
- Franz Marc, Two Women on the Hillside (German: Zwei Frauen am Berg), 1906
- Franz Marc, Hocken im Schnee, 1911
- Franz Marc, Springendes Pferd, 1912
- Franz Marc, Kleine Komposition IV, 1914
- August Macke, Große Promenade, 1914
- Ernst Ludwig Kirchner, Zwei Tänzerinnen, 1910–11
- Willi Baumeister, Figur in absoluter Stellung, 1919

== See also ==
- List of single-artist museums
