= The Tower of Blue Horses =

1913 painting by Franz Marc

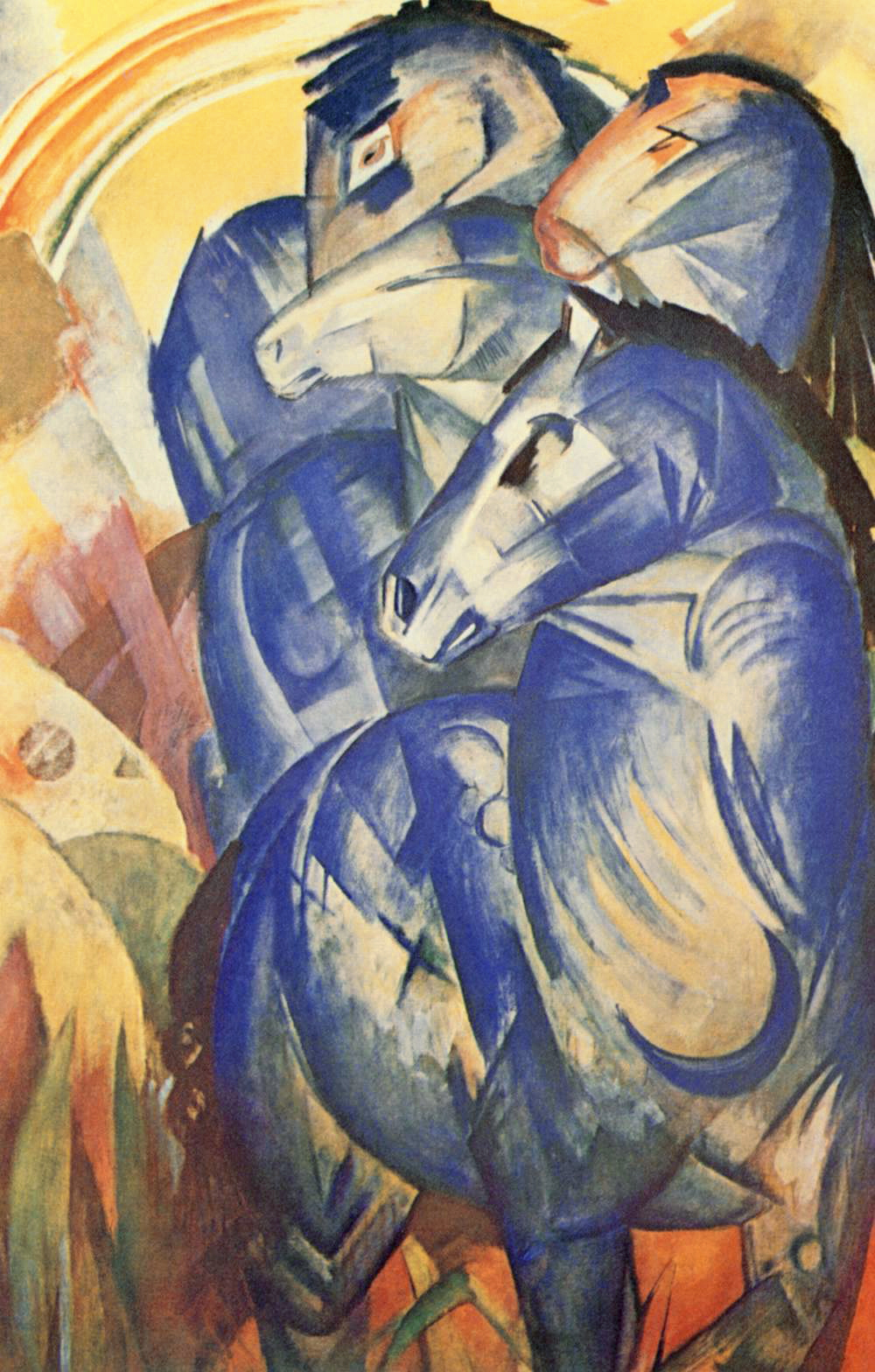
- Artist: Franz Marc
- Year: 1913
- Medium: Oil on canvas
- Dimensions: 200 cm × 130 cm (79 in × 51 in)

The Tower of Blue Horses (German: Der Turm der blauen Pferde) is a 1913 oil painting by the German Expressionist artist Franz Marc. It has been called one of his best works, but went missing in 1945.

== Description ==
The Tower of Blue Horses was a large work, 200 by 130 centimetres (6 ft 7 in × 4 ft 3 in). Most of the picture is occupied by a frontal view of four primarily blue horses, arranged in a tier to the right of centre, facing the viewer but with their heads turned to the left; the foremost horse seemed "only a little less than life size" to at least one writer. To the left of their rumps, which form the centre of the picture, is an abstract landscape; above it is an orange rainbow on a yellow background. The foremost horse has a crescent moon on its chest, and crosses on its body which suggest stars.

== History ==
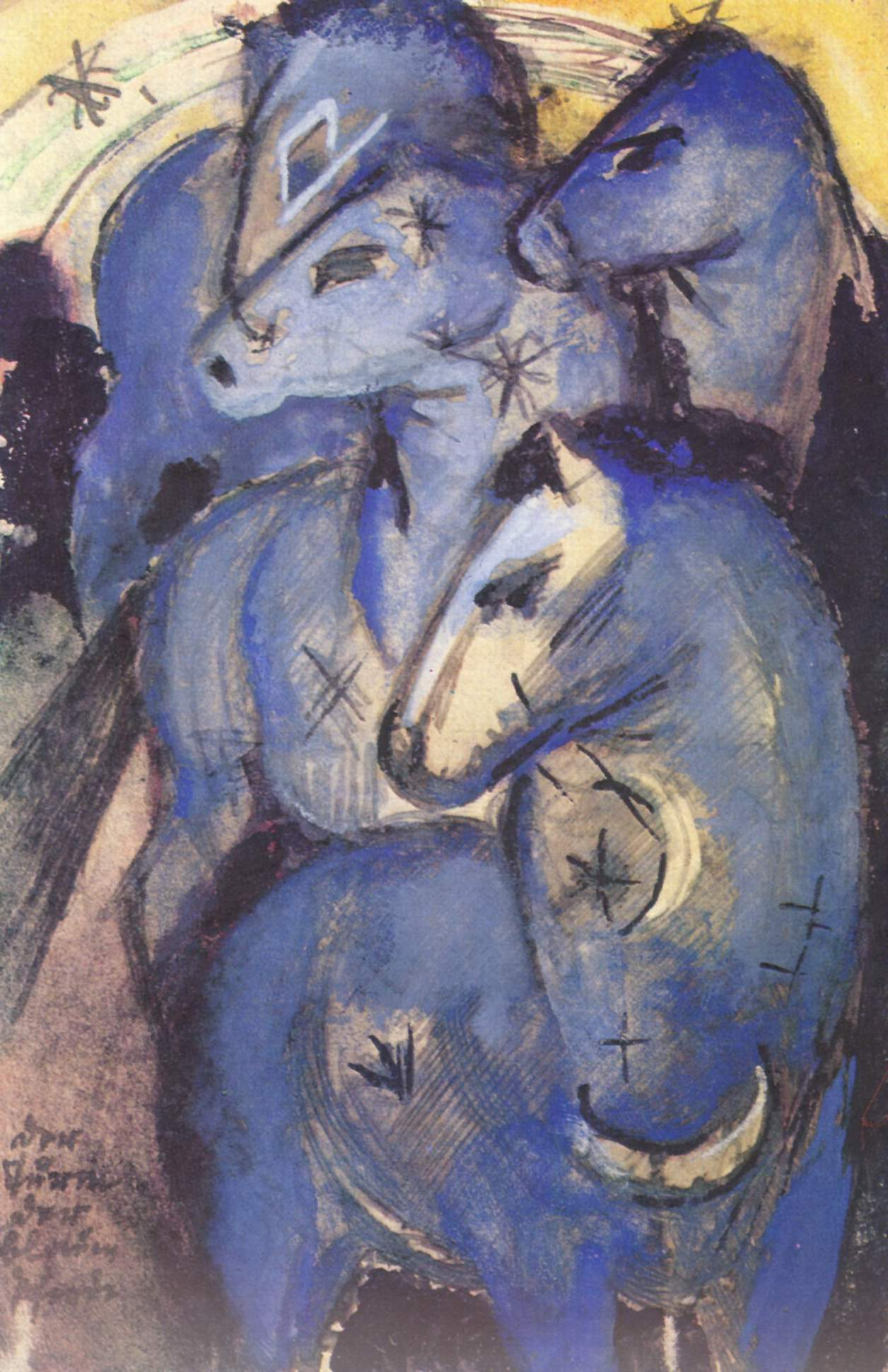
1912/13 sketch on a postcard to Else Lasker-Schüler

Marc created the painting in summer 1913. A preliminary sketch in ink and gouache survives in the form of a new year's postcard for that year to the poet Else Lasker-Schüler, one of 28 painted postcards which the artist sent to her and which she answered in illustrated letters later used in her novel Malik. The Blue Horses sketch uses her favourite colour, blue, and personal symbols of hers, the Moon and stars. This is now in the Munich State Graphics Collection. The large-format painting was one of seven works by Marc exhibited that autumn in the First German Autumn Salon (Erster Deutscher Herbstsalon).

Marc died in 1916, during World War I. After the war, The Tower of Blue Horses was one of the works by Marc acquired for the new contemporary annexe of the Berlin National Gallery housed in the Kronprinzenpalais. It was removed from there as part of the "cleansing" of modern art works under the Nazis, and included in the Degenerate Art exhibition which opened in July 1937 in Munich. However, in response to a protest by veterans because Marc had died fighting for his country in the war, the painting was removed and was not included in the exhibition when it opened in Berlin. At that time it was valued at 80,000 Reichsmarks. In spring 1936, now valued at 20,000 RM, it was then transferred to Hermann Göring's custody as part of a select group of valuable modernist paintings which also included two other works by Marc. Göring sold at least some of these at a considerable profit, but appears not to have sold The Tower of Blue Horses, which went missing at war's end.

Edwin Redslob, an art historian who became Rector of the Free University of Berlin, wrote in 1977 that he had seen the painting in the Haus am Waldsee in Zehlendorf, Berlin, while still under Soviet occupation, i.e., in the first half of 1945, and the journalist Joachim Nawrocki reported having seen it in the adjacent youth hostel in the winter of the Berlin Blockade, 1948/49, with two or three slits cut in it. Other statements and theories about the fate of the painting that have been published include its having been destroyed at Carinhall when Göring had the house blown up as the Russians advanced towards it in 1945, its having been in the Prussian Chamber of Deputies, and its being in Switzerland, most likely in a bank safe in Zurich; in 2001 an art collector claimed to have been offered it for sale. Art historian Roland März put the painting on the catalogue cover when he organised an exhibition on the German Expressionists in 1986 at the (then East German) National Gallery, hoping that "a little old lady from the eastern Ore Mountains would come into [his] office and unroll a canvas out of which the crystals of blue pigment would spill", and has continued to search for it, but it has not reappeared.

== Reception and significance ==
The Tower of Blue Horses is one of several animal paintings by Marc, among which a large group depict horses. It is one of the most notable of those in which he attempts to "see and paint through [the animal's] eyes", or as Paul Klee put it, "he raises them to his own level". It deeply impressed many viewers; one wrote: "[The painting] holds us spellbound ... A group of four horses lights up before our eyes like a vision ... The mighty body of the foremost animal ... seems to emerge from the depths and stop immediately in front of the viewer". The tightly knit composition of the work with its geometric structure and the use of colour—with the transparency of stained glass, and with decreasing saturation as the eye travels upwards—sets up a powerful upwards movement.

In a 1921 lecture at Berlin University, the theologian Paul Tillich singled out this painting as an exemplar of the Expressionists' "destroying natural forms and colours in order to gain an insight into the inner truth of things." Susanna Partsch suggests that the moon, rainbow, and suggestion of stars point to a reading of the painting as an attempt "to portray the unity of creature and cosmos", in which mankind is sublimated in the horses, who represent his power. The painting has been regarded as one of the artist's finest works.

== In popular culture ==
In the episode 8 of the second series of the 2016 MacGyver reboot (titled Packing Peanuts + Fire), the painting is used as bait by the heros to make contact with an art thief.

== See also ==
- List of works by Franz Marc
