= Blue Horse I =

Painting by Franz Marc

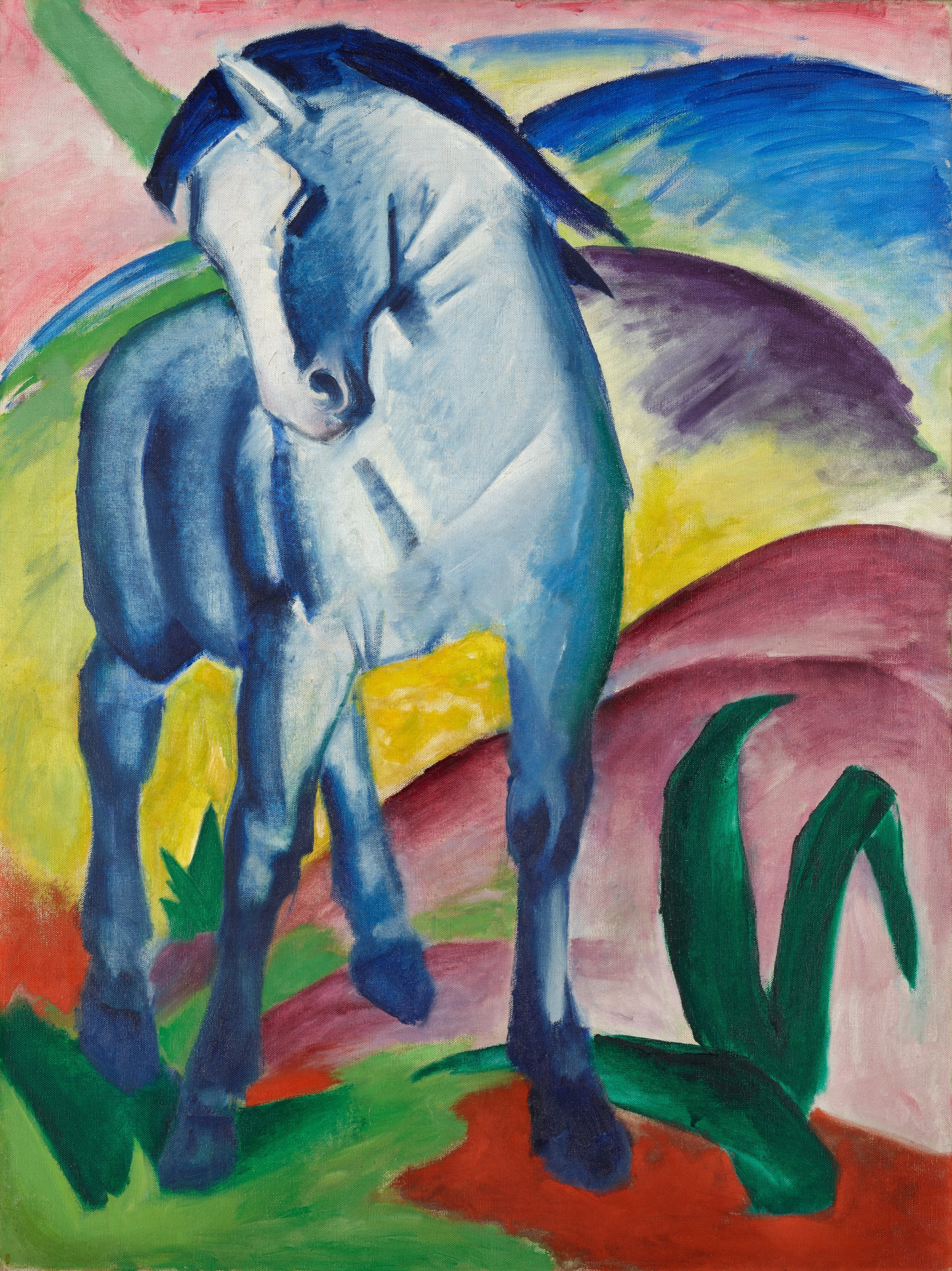
- Artist: Franz Marc
- Year: 1911
- Medium: Oil on canvas
- Dimensions: 112 cm × 84.5 cm (44 in × 33.3 in)
- Location: Städtische Galerie im Lenbachhaus; Munich

Blue Horse I is an oil painting by Franz Marc completed in 1911. It is one of the painter's most famous works and is part of the collection of the Städtische Galerie im Lenbachhaus in Munich. The painting was part of several exhibitions that Franz Marc and fellow Russian painter Wassily Kandinsky presented to the public under the name Der Blaue Reiter from late 1911 until 1914.

== History ==
In 1911, Marc drew in his sketchbook no. XXIV a pencil drawing, about the size of a postcard, entitled Young Horse in Mountain Landscape, which already shows the composition of the later painting. In the same year, he transcribed the sketch in great detail into a large oil painting.

In the color theory of Marc and the Der Blaue Reiter group, the blue color stands for the spiritual principle. The painting was initially not understood and was derided or even spat upon. It was part of the private collection of Bernhard Koehler, who supported Marc financially and received paintings from the artist in return. Koehler bequeathed his art collection to his son, also named Bernhard, in 1927. After the son's death, the painting came to the Bernhard Koehler Foundation. In 1965, it was offered to the Städtische Galerie im Lenbachhaus in Munich, where it has been exhibited ever since. As a popular poster and postcard motif, it was one of the most frequently reproduced paintings in art history as of 2010.

== Description ==
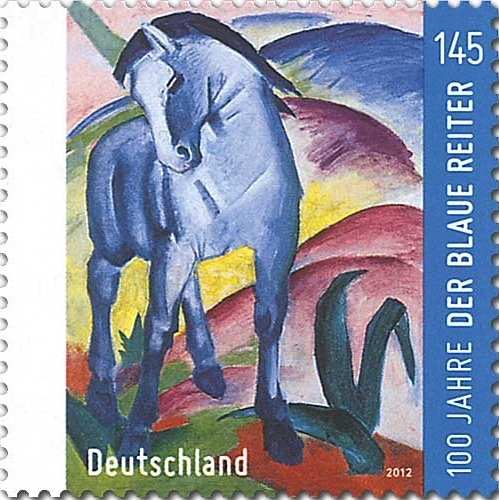
Germany stamp with the painting Blue Horse I, issued in 2012 to celebrate the 100th anniversary of Der Blaue Reiter

Almost the entire height of the portrait-format painting is taken up by a foal painted in blue, facing the viewer and tilting its head slightly to one side. The upper body is light blue with white spots, while the hooves and mane are painted in dark navy blue.

The landscape in which the foal is shown is dominated by strong contrasts of complementary colors, some of which are sharply demarcated from one another. The foreground is in vermilion and light green, and strong dark green brushstrokes indicate vegetation. The hilly landscape in the background changes from carmine to yellow, violet, and blue to orange at the top of the picture. The blue color of the horse represents peace and the calm state of mind that Marc would have had when drawing it. Blue horses are symbolically bound to certain of the originating conceptions of the contemporaneous Blue Rider group: in the symbol of the horse as a vehicle of breakthrough, in the emphasis on the spirituality of the color blue, and in the idea of spirituality battling materialism.

Marc used the blue horse motif again in several of his paintings in the following years, from 1911 to 1914.

== Honours ==
The Deutsche Post issued a stamp with the painting on 9 February 2012, to celebrate the 100th anniversary of Der Blaue Reiter.

== See also ==
- List of works by Franz Marc
