= Jacopo da Sellaio =

Italian painter

Jacopo del Sellaio
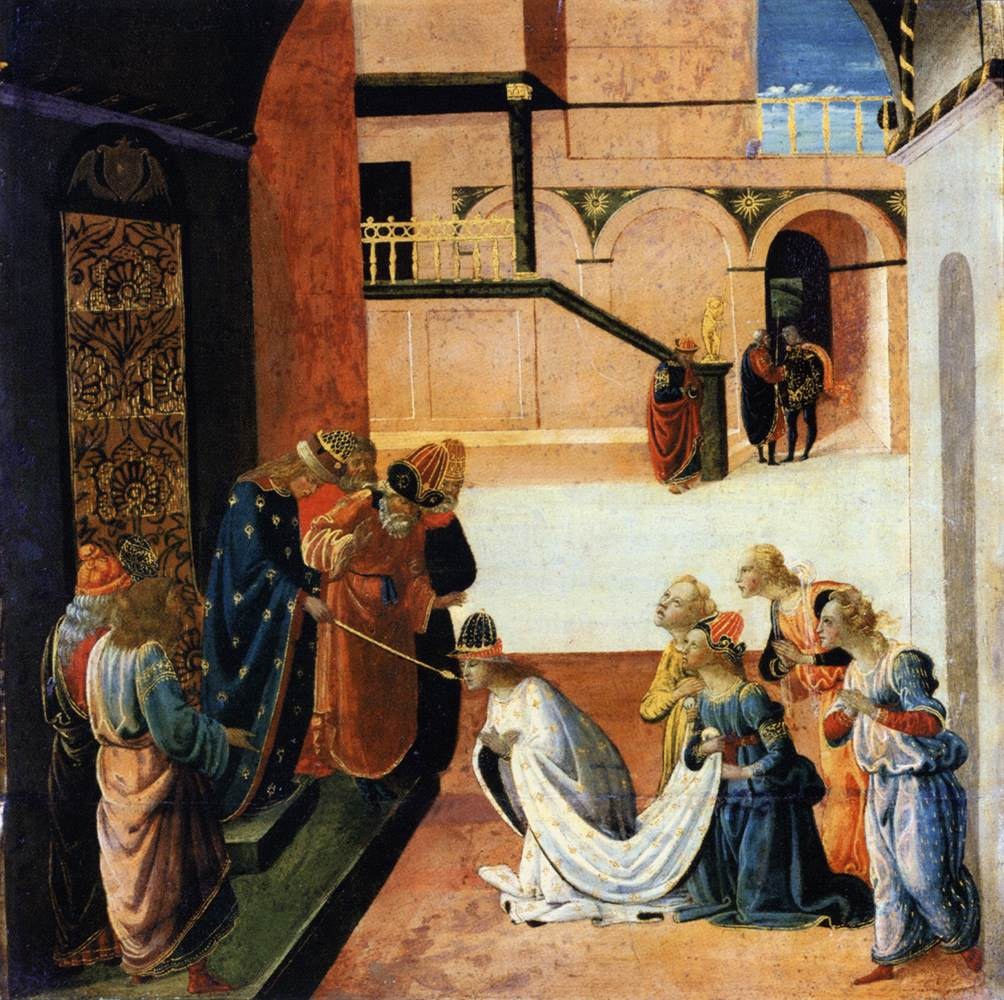
- Jacopo del Sellaio, Esther Before Ahasuerus, c. 1490, Museum of Fine Arts, Budapest
- Born: 1441/42; Florence, Italy
- Died: 1493 (aged 51–52); Florence, Italy
- Education: Filippo Lippi
- Known for: Painting

Jacopo del Sellaio (1441/42–1493) was an Italian painter of the early Renaissance, active in his native Florence. His real name was Jacopo di Arcangelo. He worked in an eclectic style based on those of Botticelli, Filippino Lippi, and Domenico Ghirlandaio. The nickname Sellaio derives from the profession of his father, a saddle maker.

According to Vasari, Sellaio was a pupil of Fra Filippo Lippi. In Lippi's workshop he would have met Botticelli, who had a lasting influence on Sellaio's work. Sellaio joined the Florentine painters' confraternity the Compagnia di San Luca in 1460. In 1472 he was sharing a workshop with Biagio d'Antonio, and in 1473 he formed a partnership with Filippo di Giuliano that he maintained until his death in 1493. A painter named Zanobi di Giovanni is documented in the workshop in 1490. Neither Filippo nor Zanobi's extant works have been identified, but the former is sometimes identified with the anonymous painter known as the Master of the Fiesole Epiphany.

Today Sellaio is best known for paintings from the fronts of cassoni, or wedding chests. These often depict stories from ancient mythology, Roman history, or the Bible. His most famous such commission is the Morelli and Nerli pair of 1472 (now London, Courtauld Institute Galleries), manufactured by the carpenter Zanobi di Domenico and painted by Sellaio in collaboration with Biagio d'Antonio. Sellaio's three panels with the Story of Esther, now in the Uffizi Gallery, Florence, also belonged to a pair of cassoni along with two other panels now in the Museum of Fine Arts, Budapest and the Louvre, Paris.

Sellaio produced a large number of religious panels, including many of the Saint Jerome and Saint John the Baptist. His altarpieces include two panels of the Annunciation for Santa Lucia dei Magnoli in Florence, painted in 1473; a Pietà commissioned in 1483 for the chapel of the Compagnia di San Frediano detta della Brucciata in the Florentine church of San Frediano (later at the Kaiser Friedrich Museum in Berlin and destroyed in 1945); and a Crucifixion painted around 1490, also for San Frediano and now in the seventeenth-century church of San Frediano in Cestello.

Sellaio's son, Arcangelo (1477/78–1531), was also a painter, and was formerly known as the Master of the Miller Tondo.

During the German occupation of France, Sellaio's Madonna and Child, Saint John the Baptist and Two Angels was seized in Paris from Austrian refugees Anne and Fritz Unger by a Nazi looting organisation. The painting resurfaced in 1974 at the Galerie Fischer in Lucerne, Switzerland, and was acquired via Christie's and an Italian antiquarian by the Italian collector, Federico Cerruti. A settlement between the Cerruti Foundation and the Arens-Unger family specified that the museum will tell the history of the stolen and recovered work.

The American poet Ezra Pound wrote a poem called Of Jacopo del Sellaio.

== Selected works ==
- 1472 – The Morelli-Nerli Cassone, wedding chest decorated with paintings (Courtauld Institute Galleries, London)
- ca. 1473 – Annunciation (church of Santa Lucia dei Magnoli, Florence)
- ca. 1475/80 – Story of Cupid and Psyche, two panels (Fitzwilliam Museum, Cambridge; private collection)
- 1470s – Madonna and Child with Saints Lucy, Sebastian, John the Baptist and Catherine (Ackland Art Museum, Chapel Hill, North Carolina)
- 1480 – Saint John the Baptist (National Gallery of Art, Washington D.C.)
- 1480s – Saint Jerome and Saint Francis (El Paso Museum of Art, Texas)
- 1483–86 – Pietà with Saints Fridian and Jerome (formerly Kaiser Friedrich Museum, Berlin; destroyed in 1945)
- 1480/85 – Votive Altarpiece: The Trinity, the Virgin, St. John and Donors (The National Museum of Western Art, Tokyo)
- ca. 1485 – Saint John the Baptist (Museum of Fine Arts, Budapest)
- ca. 1485 – Madonna and Child with the Infant, Saint John the Baptist and Attending Angel, oil on panel (Fine Arts Museums of San Francisco)
- ca. 1485 – The Legend of Brutus and Portia, oil on panel (Fine Arts Museums of San Francisco)
- 1480s – The Reconciliation of the Romans and Sabines, tempera and gold on panel (Philadelphia Museum of Art)
- ca. 1485–90 – Death of Eurydice; Eurydice Taken to Hades; Orpheus Playing Among the Animals, three panels (Museum Boijmans Van Beuningen, Rotterdam; Khanenko Museum of Art, Kiev; Wawel Castle, Cracow)
- ca. 1490 – Scenes from the Story of Esther (Uffizi Gallery, Florence; Museum of Fine Arts, Budapest; Louvre, Paris)
- 1490–93 – Crucifixion with the Virgin and Saints Fridian, Catherine of Alexandria, John the Evangelist, Sebastian, Tobias and the Angel and Lawrence (church of San Frediano in Cestello, Florence).

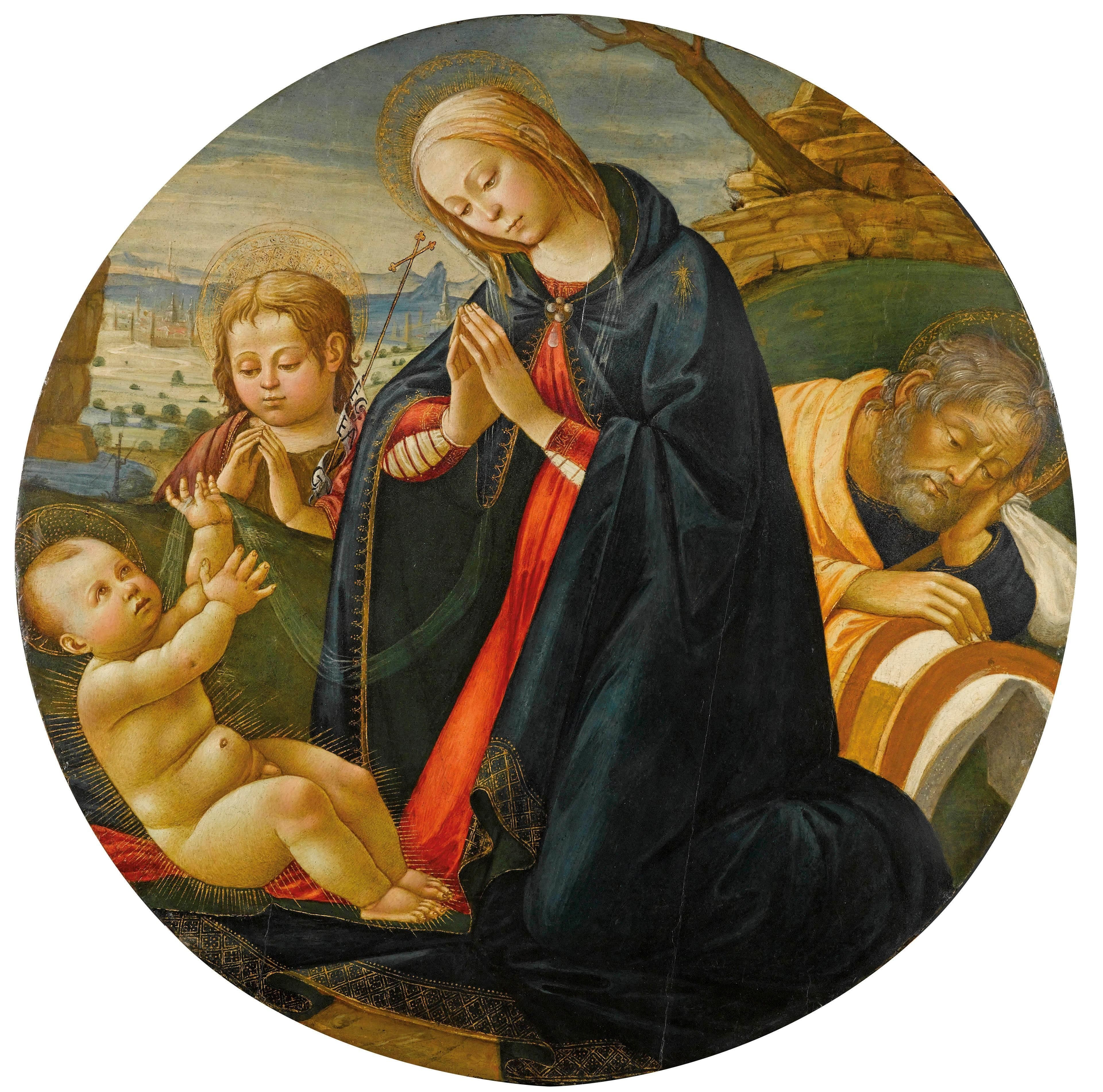
The Holy Family with Saint John, 1470s (private collection)

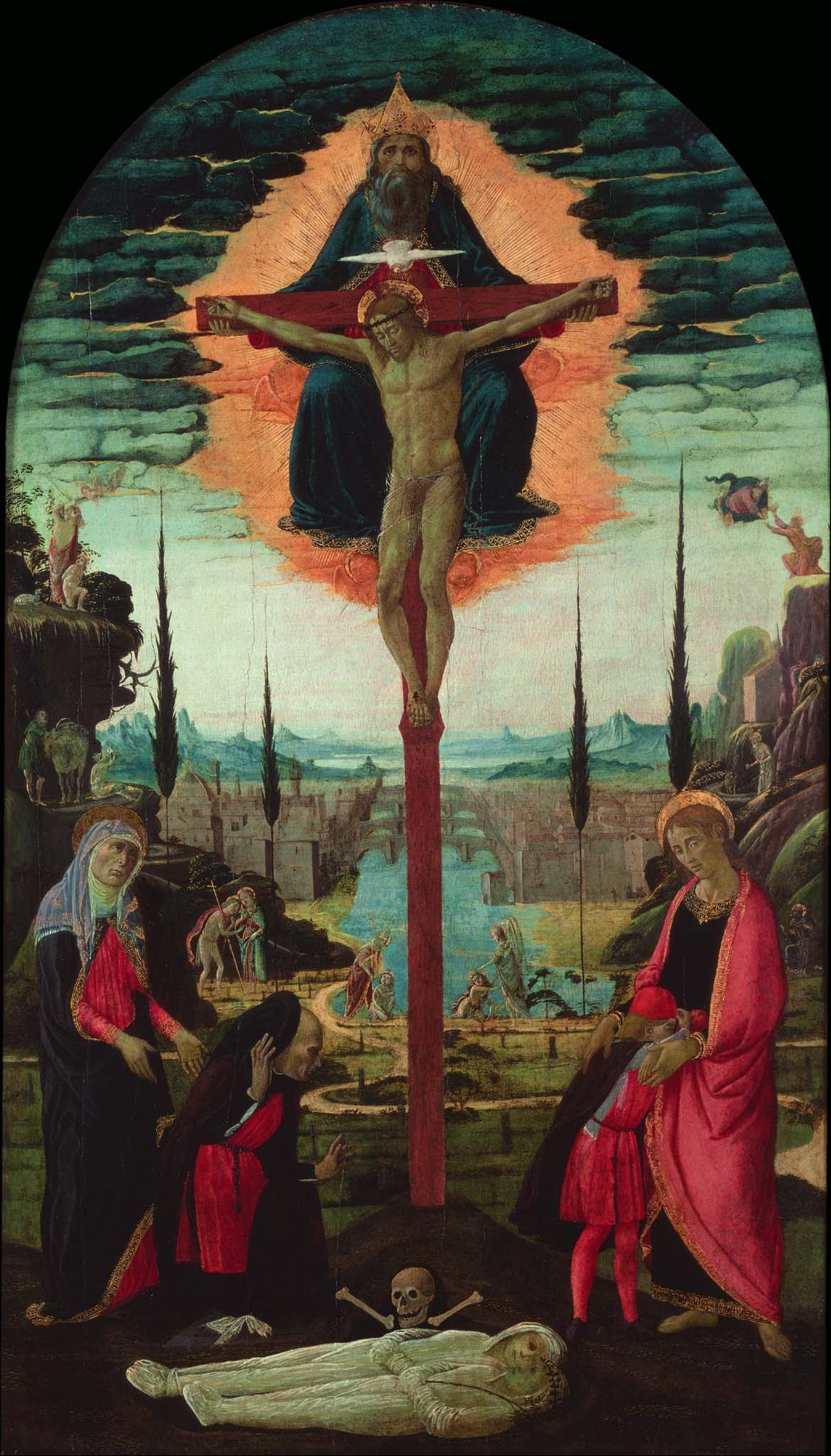
Votive Altarpiece: the Trinity, the Virgin, St. John and Donors, 1480 (The National Museum of Western Art)

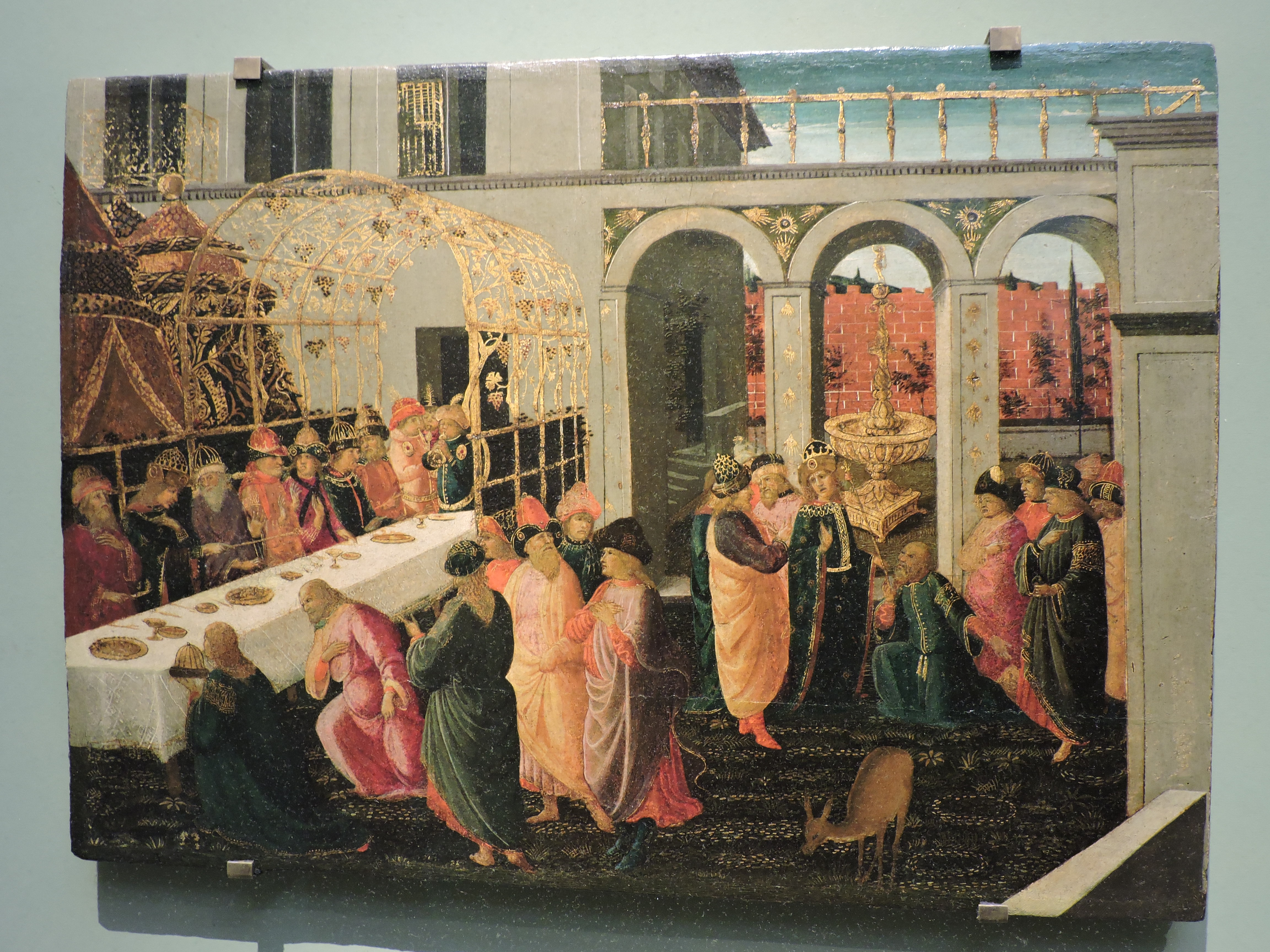
Banquet of Ahasuerus (Xerxes), originally part of a cassone with three scenes from the Book of Esther, ca. 1485 (Uffizi, Florence)

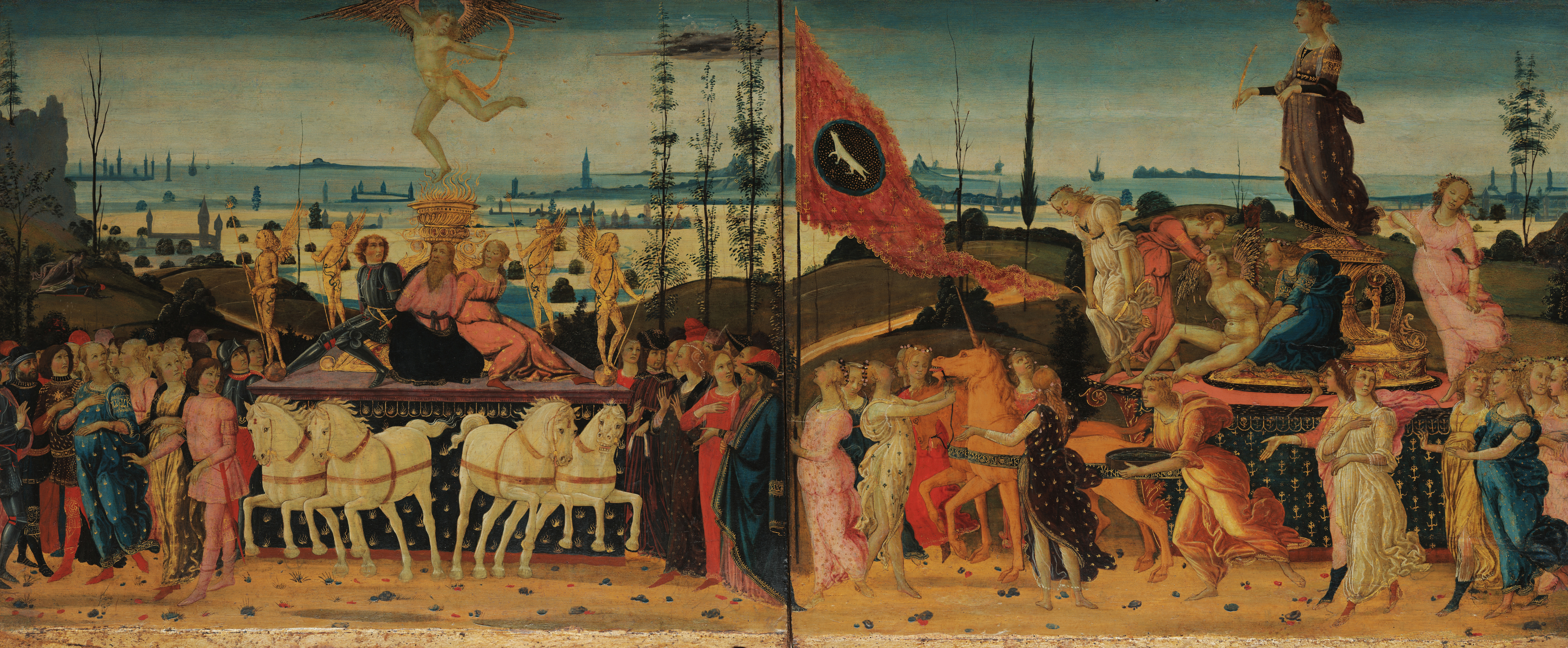
Triumph of Love and Triumph of Chastity, ca. 1485–90, after Petrarch, originally probably wall panels (Musei di Fiesole)
