= Fritz Unger =

Austrian industrialist

Fritz (Frederich) Unger (July 14, 1891 - 1954 Zürich) was an Austrian industrialist and art collector. He was of Jewish heritage and forced to flee Hitler's Third Reich.

== Life ==
Unger lived in Vienna at Wien I., Esslinggasse 17 / 6 He married Anne Arens (born June 7, 1897, Vienna; died 1994 Berkeley/California), the daughter of businessman and collector Gustav Arens (1867-1936).

Unger was the owner of the family firm, "W. Abeles & Co.", as well as factories in Teesdorf, Lower Austria, and Dugaresa, Yugoslavia.

He also collected art, especially Italian and Dutch old masters. When Unger's father-in-law Gustav Arens died in 1935, he and his wife Ann (Dr. Ann Arens Unger) inherited paintings from Arens' collection. One of the paintings passed down to Unger was "Madonna and Child, Saint John the Baptist and two angels," painted in the late 15th century by Jacopo di Arcangelo known as del Sellaio.

== Nazi era ==
In June 1938, the Unger family escaped the Nazis via Switzerland and France to the USA. In 1938, the Nazi looting organization E.R.R. seized his property. His furniture and art collection were packed by the forwarding company Dr. Franz Ritter. Pictures by van Goyen and Baur were blocked for export.

In France, Unger's paintings were "donated" to the Louvre in an attempt to obtain a residence permit. In reality, however, the family never received these papers Paintings obtained in this way from Unger by the Louvre include "Still Life with Musical Instruments", by Pieter Claesz (ca. 1596–1661), "Still Life with Flowers", by Jan de Heem II (1606-ca. 1684), and "The Family of Darius at the Feet of Alexander", by Francesco Trevisani (1656-1746). But Friedrich Unger and his family never became French. They spent the war and the rest of their lives in the United States.

Unger submitted a claim in 1946, however the French state refused the request because, as Le Monde put it, "the offending regime is the Republic" and the transaction was "Not a theft, not a forced sale, but a gift."

On February 28, 1946, the Louvre's curatorial committee issued a "unanimous" refusal: "Such a decision would risk creating an unfortunate precedent."kept the painting and there was no resolution until 2009

The family repeatedly requested that the French authorities reconsider their decision.

In March 2004, Jacques Foucart, general curator of the department of paintings, interviewed by Le Monde, still considered that the case was clear and that any reconsideration of the donation would be an "abuse of interpretation". This "abuse" was taken up by the Ministry of Culture in December 2008. The request of the Unger family was then judged "legally fragile but morally indisputable". Especially since the family does not claim the restitution of the works, but a compensation. - Le Monde (translation)

Unger's heir later refiled claims for restitution. In 2020 his 93-year-old daughter, Grete Unger Heinz, told The Art Newspaper that she had "lost hope" of ever seeing the paintings resurface. However, one of the looted paintings, "Madonna and Child, Saint John the Baptist and two angels," was rediscovered in the 21st century in the possession of the foundation created by the Italian art collector Francesco Federico Cerruti. The Foundation Cerruti traced the ownership history of the painting, which Cerrutti had acquired at auction at Christie's, to the Galerie Fischer in Lucerne, Switzerland, where it had "appeared mysteriously" in 1974, three decades after the Nazis seized it from the Ungers. While some of the looted paintings were restituted immediately after the war, many paintings from the Arens-Unger collection are still missing and are listed on France's ERR database.

In 2020 a settlement was reached between the Cerruti foundation and the Arens Unger family.

== See also ==
- List of claims for restitution for Nazi-looted art
- The Holocaust in Austria
- Reichsleiter Rosenberg Taskforce Nazi looting organisation
- Paris in World War II
