= Theodor Fischer (auctioneer) =

Swiss art dealer and auctioneer

Theodore Fischer auctioning Georges Braque's Stilleben (Still Life) (1924) in 1939

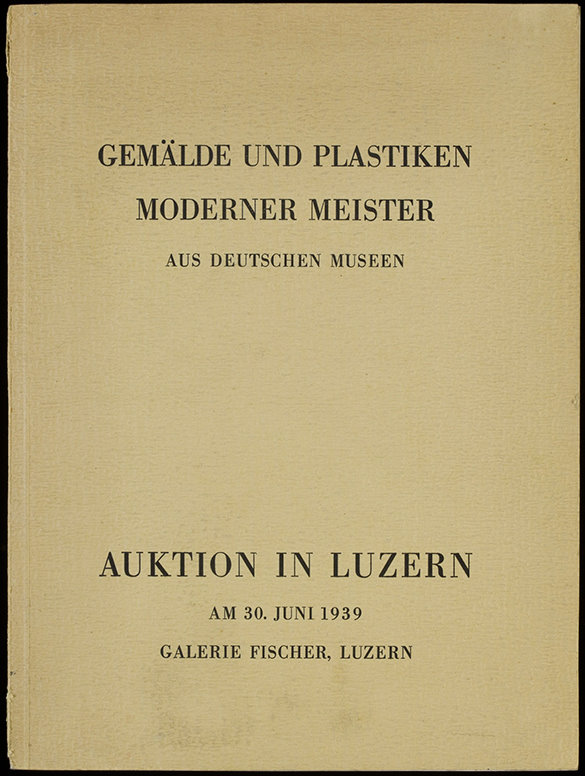
The catalogue for the 1939 sale at the Grand Hotel

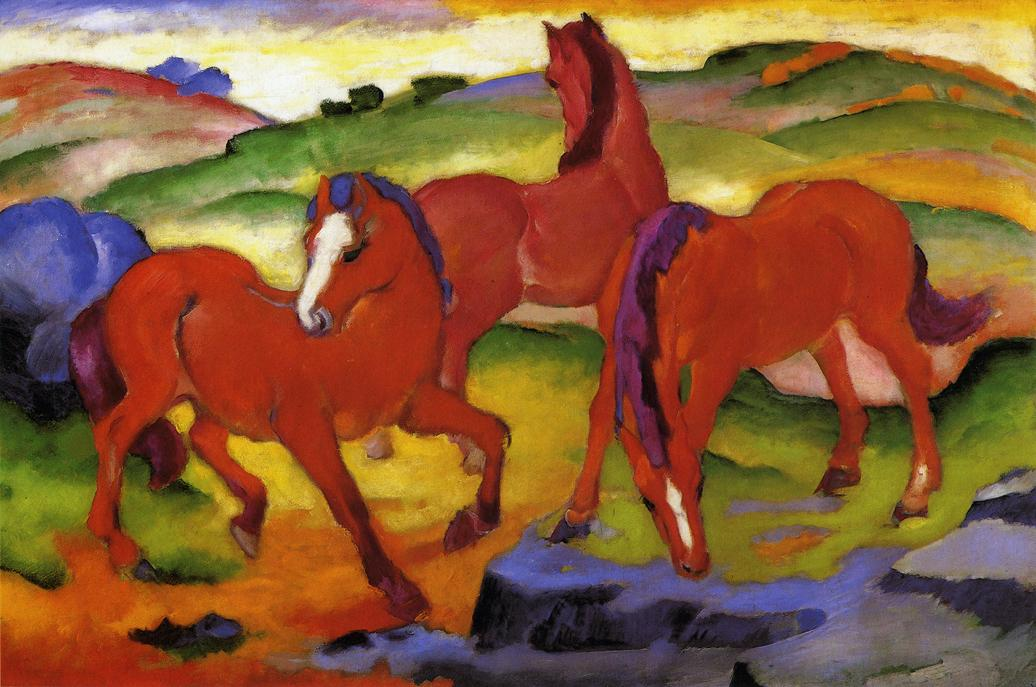
Franz Marc, Grazing Horses IV, or Three Red Horses, 1911. One of the pictures sold by Fischer at the 1939 Grand Hotel auction.

Theodor Fischer (1878–1957) was a Swiss art dealer and auctioneer in Lucerne who after the First World War built a highly successful firm of auctioneers that dominated the Swiss art market. In 1939 he was the auctioneer at the infamous Grand Hotel auction of "degenerate art" removed from German museums by the Nazis. During the Second World War he played a key part in the trading of art looted by the Germans from occupied countries.

== Early life ==
Fischer was born in 1878. In his early career he was associated with the firm of Paul Cassirer of Berlin, with whom a joint auction was held in 1931 after Cassirer's death. He became a director of the Bosshard Gallery in Lucerne.

== Between the World Wars ==
Fischer founded Galerie Fischer in 1907. He later established a branch of the gallery in Berlin. He built up a large business in Lucerne between the wars and sold a number of important collections. He established his own premises there in 1939 at 17 Haldenstrasse. Before then auctions were conducted at the Zur Meisen Guild House in Zurich and the Grand Hotel National, Haldenstrasse, in Lucerne.

== 1939 Fischer Galerie auction ==
In 1937 the Nazi party assembled, from art that they had removed from German museums, the Degenerate Art Exhibition, an exhibition of mostly modern art that toured Germany until early 1939. The exhibition was intended to show the deterioration in art brought about by Jewish and Bolshevik influences. The creation of the exhibition was followed up by a far larger exercise to collect "degenerate art" from throughout Germany. On the instructions of Joseph Goebbels, German Reich Minister of Propaganda, attempts were made to sell some of the more valuable "degenerate" works abroad to raise foreign currency to help the war effort. Dealers were appointed in Germany for this purpose and Theodor Fischer was selected to hold an auction in Switzerland. This took place on 30 June 1939 at the Grand Hotel National in Luzern organised and conducted by Theodor Fischer.

Among the 126 pictures offered were Franz Marc's Three Red Horses, Paul Gauguin's Landscape of Tahiti with Three Female Tigers, Pablo Picasso's The Harlequins and a self-portraits by Paula Modersohn-Becker and Vincent van Gogh. In addition, there were four more paintings by Marc, fifteen by Lovis Corinth, nine by Carl Hofer, nine by Oskar Kokoschka, seven by Emil Nolde, five by Ernst Barlach, two by Paul Klee, and three each by Max Beckmann, Erich Heckel, Ernst Kirchner, Max Pechstein and Karl Schmidt-Rottluff. Despite the contempt of the Nazis for the "degenerate art" on offer, the auction was described by the Fischer gallery as a sale of Gemälde und Plastiken Moderner Meister aus Deutschen Museen, (Paintings and Sculptures of Modern Masters from German Museums).

The sale was widely publicised and previews were held at Zurich and Lucerne but it did not have the atmosphere of a normal fine art auction. Some people were in the audience only out of curiosity and a number of bidders, who might have been expected to attend, were absent because they were worried the proceeds would be used to prop-up the Nazi regime. Others were bargain-hunters or bought because they feared what would happen to the pictures if they went unsold. Marianne Feilchenfeldt and her husband were shocked to discover that one of the canvases for sale was Cathedral of Bordeaux (1924/25) by Oskar Kokoschka, a painting that they had donated to the Nationalgalerie in Berlin but which had been deaccessioned in 1937.

Curt Valentin, owner of the Buchholz Gallery in New York, purchased five works at the behest of Alfred H. Barr Jr. The director of the Museum of Modern Art "secretly enlisted Valentin as his agent in the Fischer auction, with funds supplied by his trustees". The paintings were: "André Derain's "Valley of the Lot at Vers," stolen from the Cologne Museum; E. L. Kirchner's "Street Scene" and Wilhelm Lehmbruck's "Kneeling Woman," both taken from the Berlin National Gallery; Paul Klee's "Around the Fish," pilfered from the Dresden Gallery, and Henri Matisse's "Blue Window," seized from the Essen Museum."

Fischer's auctioneering was reported by Beaux Arts of France to be efficient but the journal couldn't help noting his disdainful attitude to the lots. Of Man with a Pipe by Max Pechstein they reported that, "he said with a little sneer, "This must be a portrait of the artist" ... when he withdrew other lots, which he had started at rather a high minimum, he took wicked pleasure in observing loudly, "Nobody wants that sort of thing," or "This lady doesn't please the public" ... and he smiled when he said the word "withdrawn". The prices realised in the sale were below expectations and twenty-eight lots went unsold.

== Second World War ==
Many of the established art markets in Europe were closed or restricted during the Second World War, making neutral Switzerland with its borders with Germany, Italy, Austria and France, an attractive alternative to Paris or London as a place to buy or sell art.

People were dislocated by the war and some had capital trapped abroad, leading to an urgent need to raise funds. The wife of Jewish collector Julius Freund, for instance, who had been forced to flee Germany, sold part of his collection through Galerie Fischer as she urgently needed to raise funds. The Nazi regime in Germany sold looted art in order to raise foreign currency and collectors and dealers sought to profit from sales forced by wartime exigencies.

Fischer, who already dominated the Swiss market, was able to exploit these conditions to the full, to the extent that in 1946, the U.S. Office of Strategic Services Art Looting Intelligence Unit (ALIU) described him as "the focal point in all looted art transactions in Switzerland, and recipient of the greatest number of looted paintings located to date".

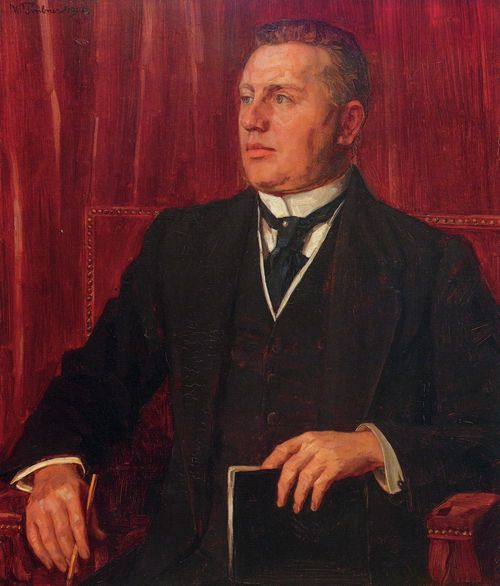
Karl Haberstock by Wilhelm Trübner, 1914. Haberstock was Adolf Hitler's art agent and a client of Fischer.

=== Methods ===
Fischer used an agent in Darmstadt named Carl Bümming to negotiate with Adolf Hitler's art agent Karl Haberstock, who like Fischer had worked for Cassirer. In Switzerland, Fischer used the services of Swiss-resident German dealer Hans Wendland to import large quantities of looted art into the country for onward sale. In November 1942, Wendland received a whole railway wagon full of art from Paris. In 1943 he received a large quantity of art from Italy. According to Douglas Cooper, Wendland acted on behalf of Fischer in negotiating with Hermann Göring's art agent Walter Hofer, and Wendland and Fischer were partners in most of the transactions. The two had known each other since at least 1931 when Fischer had bailed Wendland out of some financial difficulties. According to Cooper, the value of trade between Fischer and Hofer for the two years to December 1942 was Swiss Francs 1,133,930. Trade between Hofer and Wendland between 1940 and January 1944 was French Francs 7,420,000 and Swiss Francs 258,000. Fischer also had close connections with the Zurich galleries Galerie Schmidlin and Galerie Neupert, both of which dealt in looted art. The ALIU and Bergier commission Reports also point to the importance of German refugee art dealers such as Fritz Nathan who acted as an intermediary between Fischer, Hofer and Emil Georg Bührle.

=== Deals with Hermann Göring ===
Fischer made several deals with Hermann Göring through his agent Walter Hofer. Göring particularly prized German old master works and in February 1941, Hofer selected seven such from Galerie Fischer which were shipped to Göring's palace at Karinhall. They included four paintings by the German master Lucas Cranach the Elder, a triptych by a Frankfurt master and a statue of a Female Saint Holding a Ring (c. 1500) of the Nuremberg school. The Cranach paintings were Madonna and Child in a Landscape, Crucifixion with a Knight as Donor, St. Anne and the Virgin, and Portrait of a Bearded Kurfurst.

Göring originally agreed to pay in Swiss francs but as foreign currency was difficult to obtain, even for him, it was later agreed that Fischer would receive 25 French Impressionist paintings instead. Among these were works by Jean-Baptiste-Camille Corot, Charles Cottet, Edgar Degas, Édouard Manet, Alfred Sisley, Pierre-Auguste Renoir and Vincent van Gogh. All had previously been in the Moïse Lévy de Benzion and Alphonse Kann collections, apart from Flowers in a Vase (also known as Glass with Wild Flowers) (1890) by van Gogh, which had been part of the Alfred Lindon collection.

Another looted work handled by Fischer was Degas' Madame Camus at the Piano (1869). This had been in the Kann collection but seized by the Einsatzstab Reichsleiter Rosenberg (ERR) in 1941. From there it passed into the Göring collection who exchanged it with Gustav Rochlitz for older works. From Rochlitz it went to Wendland and from there to Fischer who sold it in 1942 to industrialist Emil Bührle. It was recovered by Kann's heirs in 1948, only to be sold back to Bührle in 1951.

Other paintings seized by the ERR for the Göring collection that passed into the hands of Theodor Fischer included:

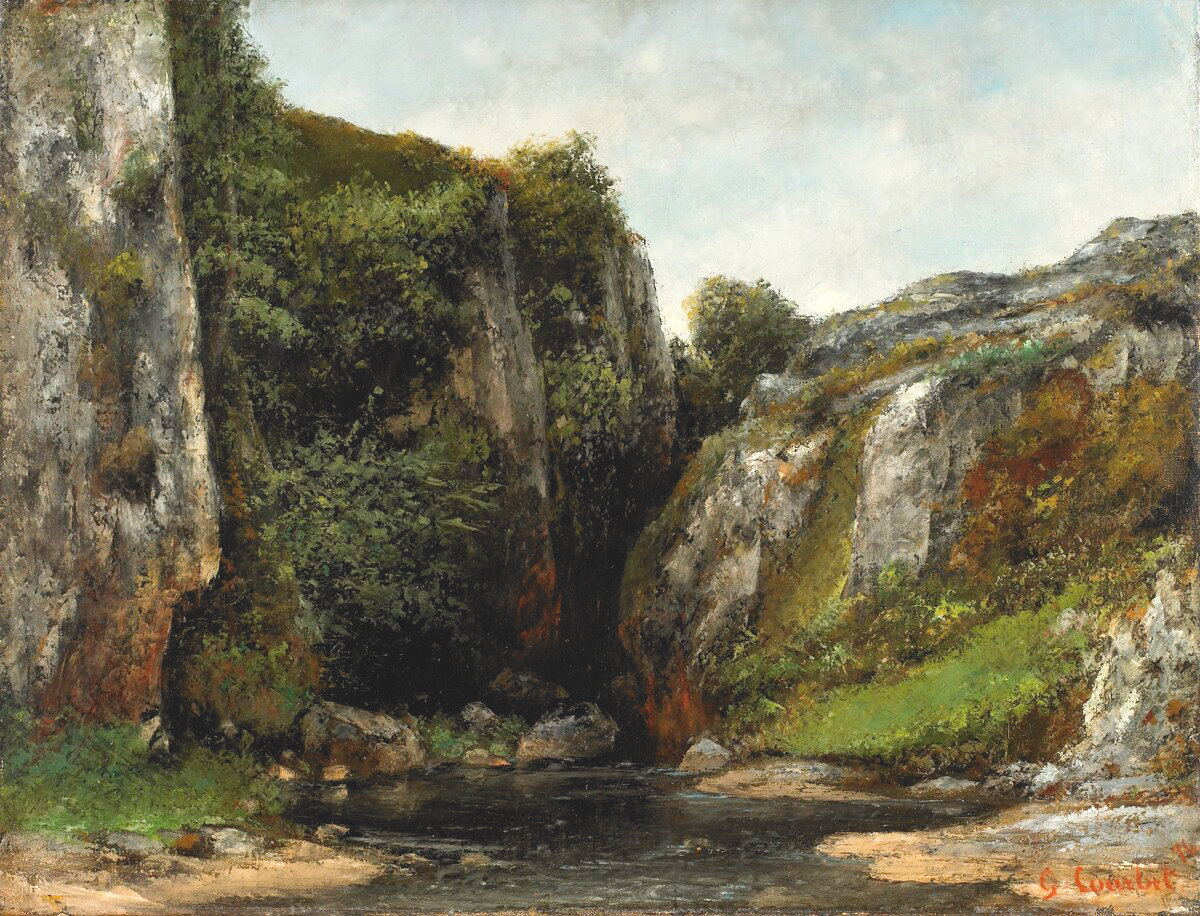
Gustave Courbet, Entree d'un Gave, 1876. Seized from Lévy de Benzion in 1941. Exchanged for old master works from Galerie Fischer in 1941.

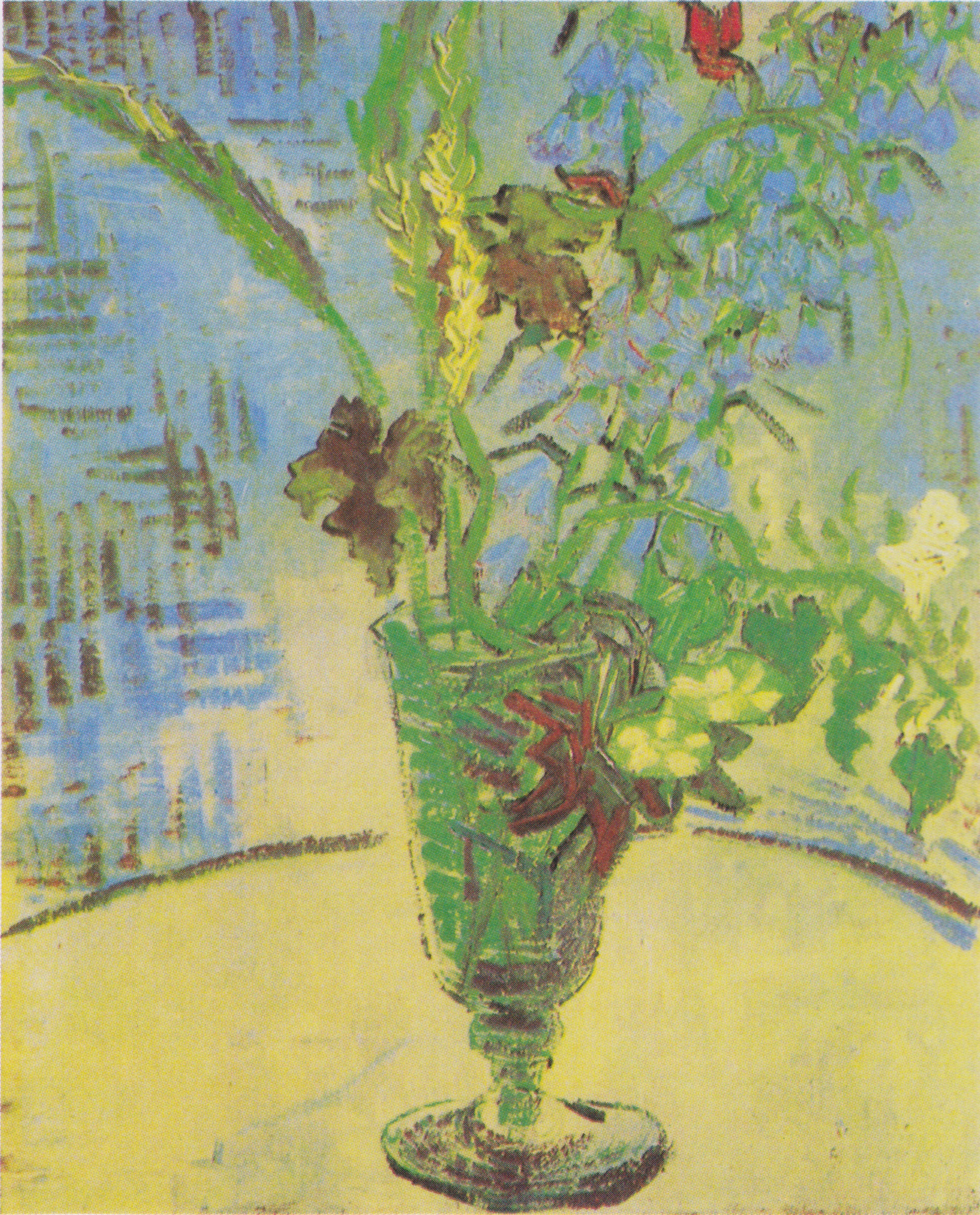
Vincent van Gogh, Flowers in a Vase, 1890. Seized from Alfred Lindon and exchanged for old master works from Galerie Fischer in 1941.

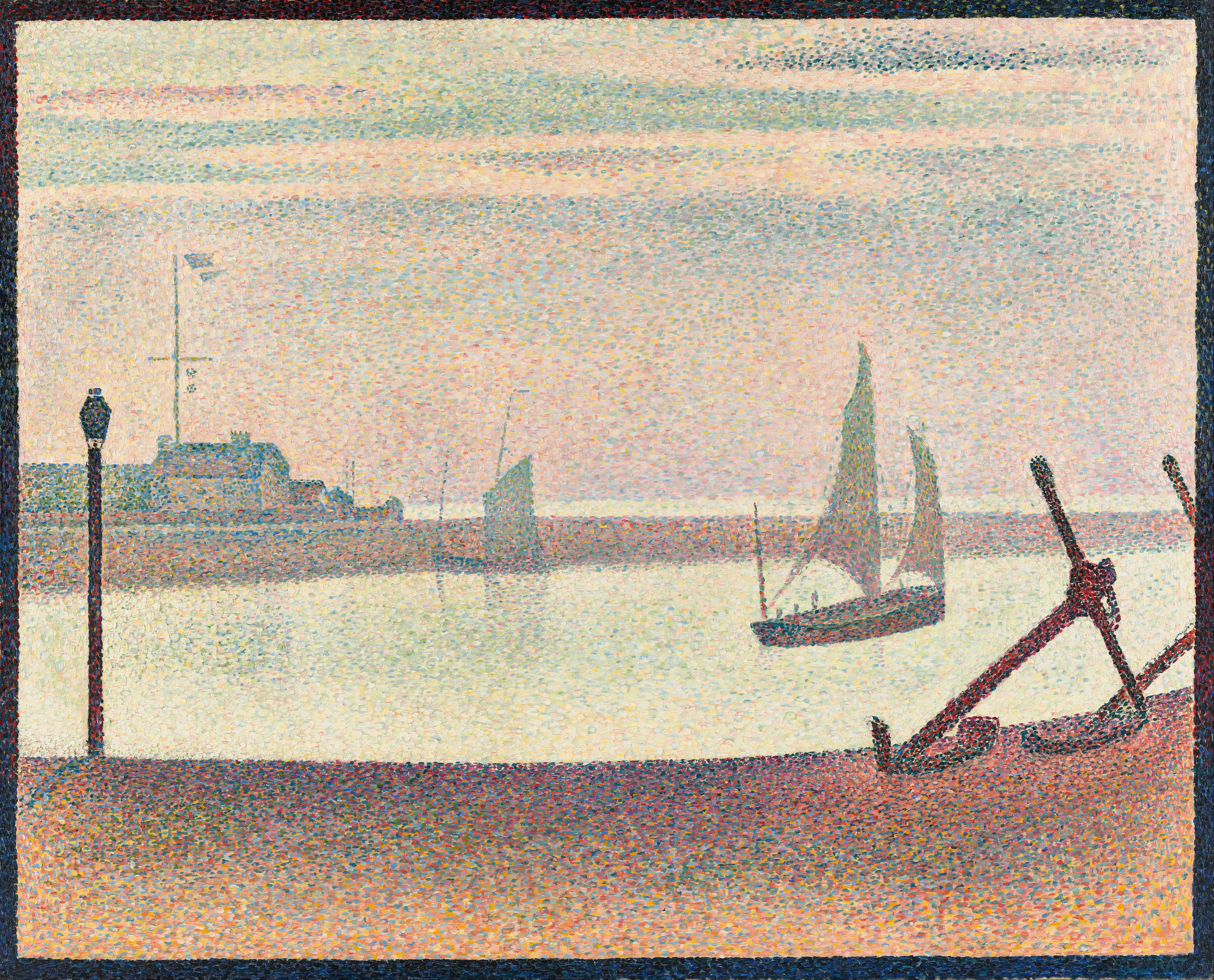
Georges Seurat, The Channel at Gravelines/Evening View of a Harbour with Two Sailboats, 1890. Seized from Paul Rosenberg in 1941. To Galerie Fischer in 1942.

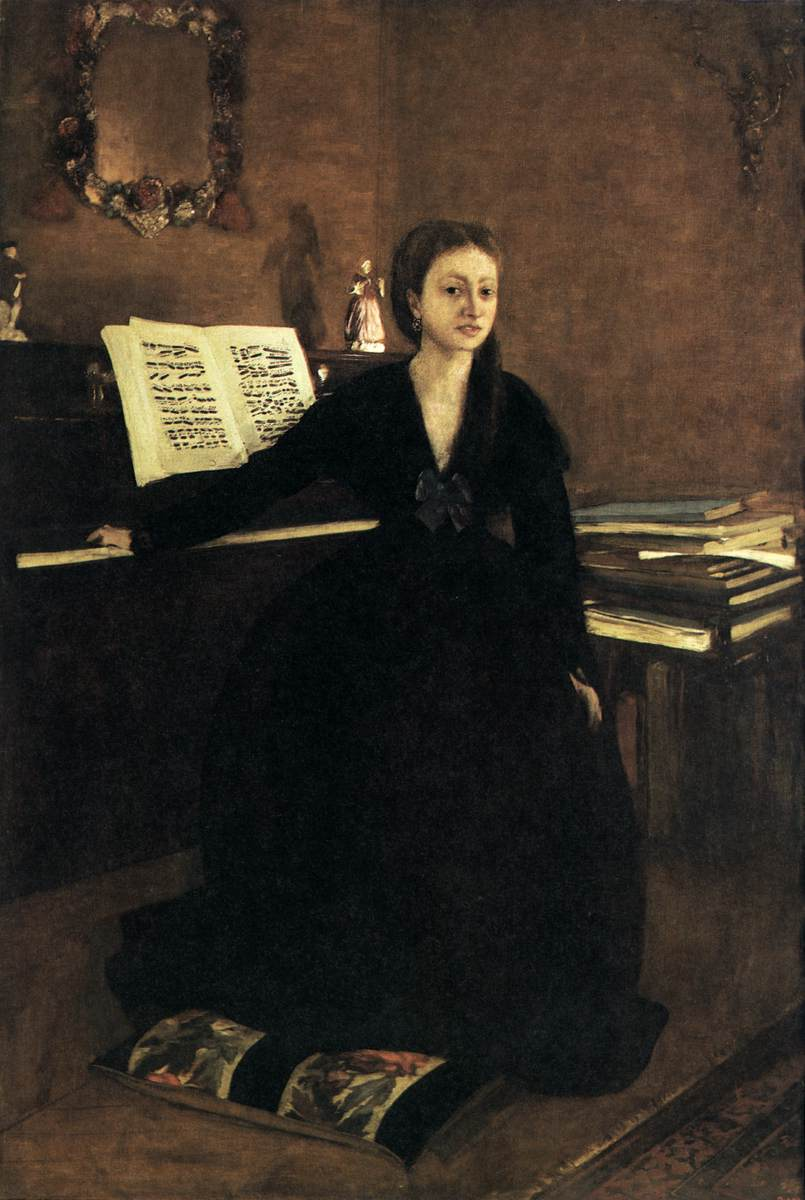
Edgar Degas, Madame Camus at the Piano, 1869. Seized from the Alphonse Kann collection 1941. Sold by Fischer to Emil Bührle in 1942.

=== South American connections ===
Among Fischer's other connections was the Catalan politician, Francoist sympathizer and art collector Francesc Cambó, who dealt almost solely with Fischer. He moved to Buenos Aires shortly after the start of the Second World War. Fischer was also connected with the Austrian dealer Thaddeus Grauer who moved to Brazil in 1941 via Switzerland. In 1998, more than twenty-four paintings looted from European Jews were discovered in a São Paulo art gallery. They were traced to Grauer and before that to Fischer. The paintings included a Picasso and a Monet.

== Post war ==
After the end of the Second World War, the descendants and original owners of looted art began to try to recover their property in a process that is still continuing.

Around September 1945, Paul Rosenberg, whose collection had been plundered by the Nazis, travelled to Switzerland in search of the paintings looted from him. Finding several in the collection of Emil Bührle, he demanded their return. Bührle refused but said he would return them to Theodor Fischer, from whom he had acquired them, as long as he received a full refund from Fischer. Fischer acknowledged that he had acquired them from Hofer and knew them to be looted but claimed that he had been unable to return them.

The Swiss government was forced to return some looted works of art to their original owners, despite the Swiss Syndicate of Art Dealers instructing its members not to provide any information on the topic. In the 1950s, Theodor Fischer sued the Swiss government for compensation of over one million Swiss Francs in respect of these restitutions but was awarded only 200,000 francs in settlement.

In 1974 a painting by Jacopo del Sellaio, "Madonna and Child, Saint John the Baptist and two angels," which had been looted in 1942 from Anna and Fritz Unger in Nazi occupied France turned up at the Galerie Fischer. It was later the object of a settlement.

== Death ==
Fischer died in 1957. His business was taken over by his sons, Arthur (1905–1981) and Paul (1911–1976).

== Major collections sold by Theodor Fischer ==
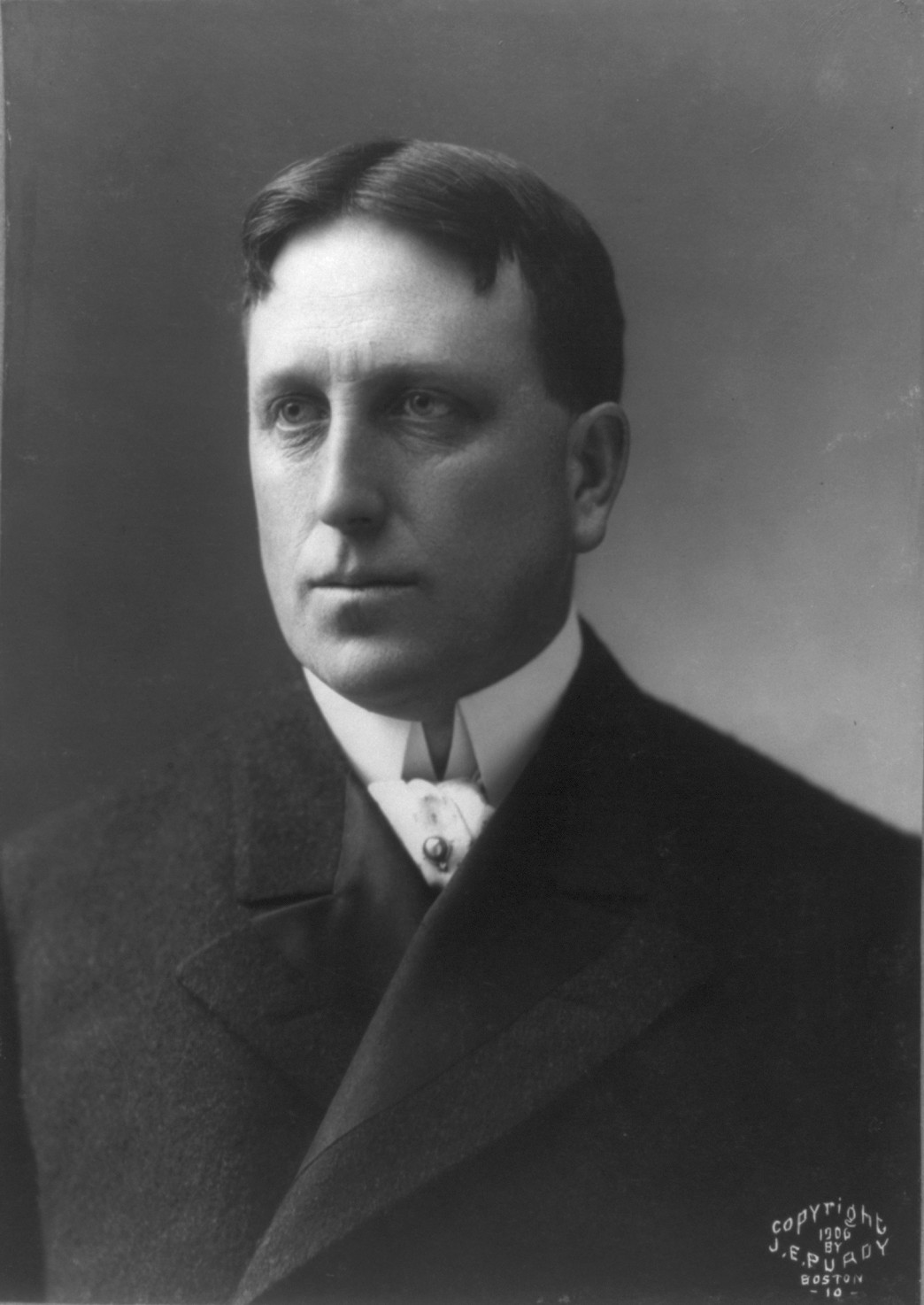
William Randolph Hearst, for whom Fischer sold arms and armour.

Note: This list excludes the Second World War era.

- The Count Harrach Collection
- The Chillingworth and Wessner Collections (1922)
- The Grossherzoglich Sächsische Arms Collection of the Grand Dukes of Saxe-Weimar-Eisenach (1927)
- The Collection of Prince Friedrich Leopold of Prussia (1928)
- The Rütschi Collection (1931)
- The estate of Dr Burger
- The Erbach Collection of Arms and Armour (1931)
- The Freiherr von Kleist Collection
- The Collection of Arms and Armour of Duke Viktor von Ratibor
- The Prince of Thun Armoury (1933)
- The Arts-and-Crafts Collection of Dr Kodella (1934)
- The Hunting Cabinet of Reichsgraf von Kaunitz
- The Bühler Collection (1935)
- The Randolph Hearst Collection of Arms and Armour (1939)
- The estate of Countess Tiele-Winkler (1951)
