= Thaddeus Grauer =

Austrian art dealer

Thaddeus Grauer (died after 1945) was an Austrian art dealer implicated in the trade in looted art from the Second World War but whose loyalties and activities are uncertain.

== Second World War era ==
Around the time of the start of the Second World War, Grauer moved to Switzerland. In 1945 he told the British Consulate-General in São Paulo that this was to avoid Nazi persecution. In 1941, he moved again, to Brazil where he was resident at Rua Alagoas 664, São Paulo. He left his personal effects with the auctioneer Theodor Fischer in Switzerland with the exception of pictures that he instructed were to be shipped to Brazil.

Recently declassified American official records note a 1942 letter from Grauer to M.P. Brandeis in New York suggesting that Brandeis organise an exhibition of anti-Nazi propaganda in New York. Grauer informed Brandeis in the letter that he was managing an estate 800 kilomoteres north of São Paulo in a region that had been infiltrated by many Japanese.

== Looted art ==
In 1998, more than 24 paintings looted from European Jews were discovered in a São Paulo art gallery that were traced to Grauer and before that Theodor Fischer. Fischer had been an important figure in the trading of art looted by the Nazis during the Second World War. The paintings included a Picasso and a Monet.
