= Franz Marc =

German artist (1880–1916)

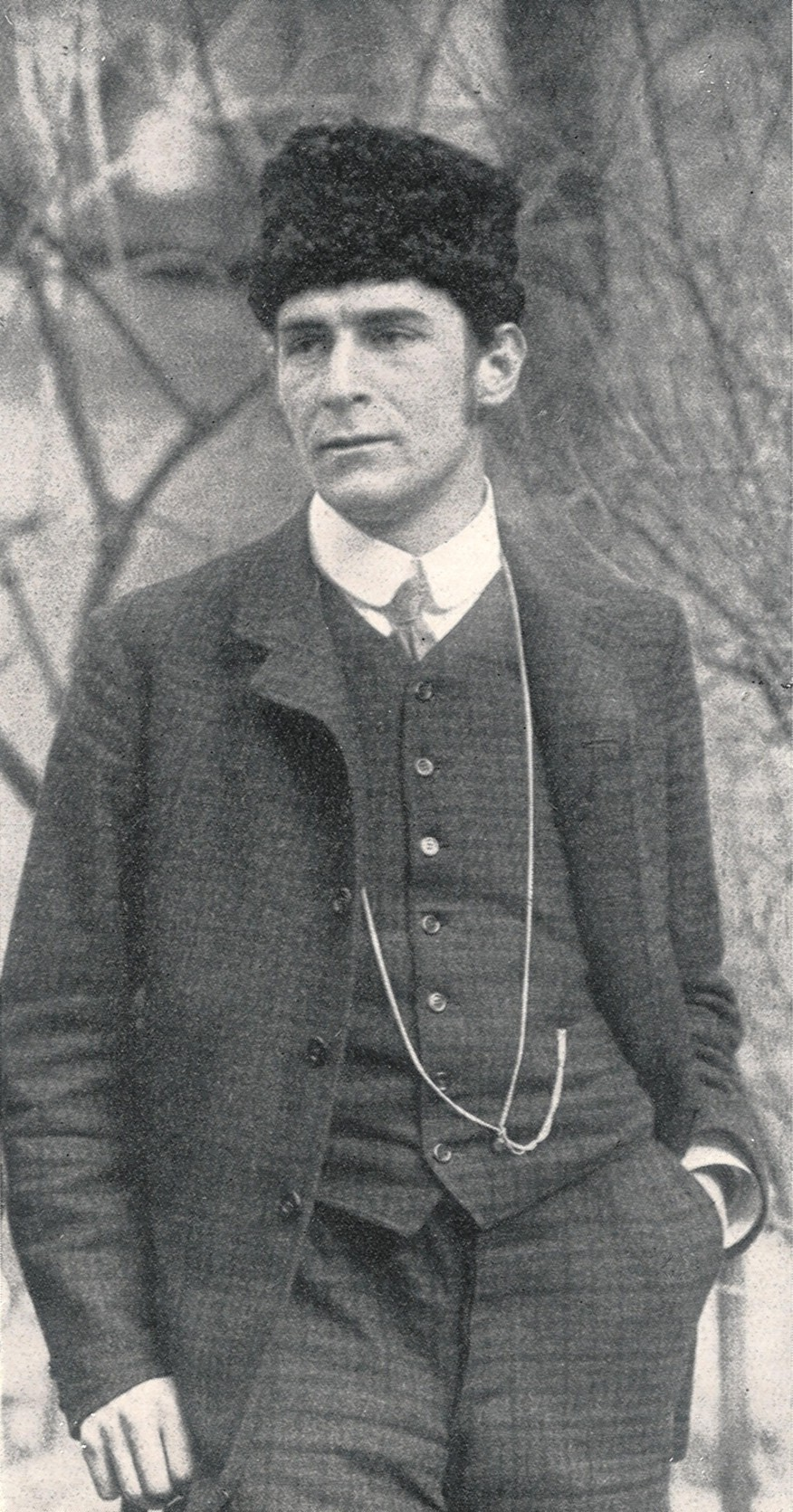
- Franz Marc in 1910
- Born: Franz Moritz Wilhelm Marc; 8 February 1880; Munich, Bavaria, German Empire
- Died: 4 March 1916 (aged 36); Braquis, France
- Education: Academy of Fine Arts, Munich
- Known for: Painting
- Notable work: The Tower of Blue Horses; Yellow Cow; Der Blaue Reiter; Blue Horse I Blue Horses
- Movement: Expressionism
- Cause of death: Killed in action at the Battle of Verdun

Signature
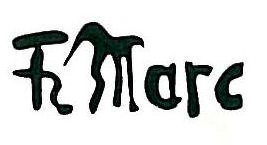

Franz Moritz Wilhelm Marc (8 February 1880 – 4 March 1916) was a German painter and printmaker, one of the key figures of German Expressionism. He was a founding member of Der Blaue Reiter (The Blue Rider), a journal whose name later became synonymous with the circle of artists collaborating in it.

His mature works mostly are animals, and are known for bright colors. He was drafted to serve in the German Army at the beginning of World War I, and died two years later at the Battle of Verdun.

In the 1930s, the Nazis named him a degenerate artist as part of their suppression of modern art. However, most of his work survived World War II, securing his legacy. His work is now exhibited in many eminent galleries and museums. His major paintings have attracted large sums, with a record of £42,654,500 for Die Füchse (The Foxes) in 2022.

== Early life ==
Franz Marc was born in 1880 in Munich, the then capital of the Kingdom of Bavaria. His father, Wilhelm Marc, was a professional landscape painter; his mother, Sophie, was a homemaker and a devout, socially liberal Calvinist. At the age of 17 Marc wanted to study theology, as his older brother Paul had. Two years later, however, he enrolled in the arts program of the Ludwig-Maximilians-Universität München. He was first required to serve in the military for a year, after which, in 1900, he began studies instead at the Academy of Fine Arts, Munich, where his teachers included Gabriel von Hackl and Wilhelm von Diez. In 1903 and 1907, he spent time in France, particularly in Paris, visiting the museums in the city and copying many paintings, a traditional way for artists to study and develop technique. In Paris, Marc frequented artistic circles, meeting numerous artists and the actress Sarah Bernhardt. He discovered a strong affinity for the work of painter Vincent van Gogh.

During his 20s, Marc was involved in a number of stormy relationships, including an affair lasting for many years with Annette von Eckhardt, a married antique dealer nine years his senior. He married twice, first to Marie Schnür, then to Maria Franck; both were artists.

== Career ==
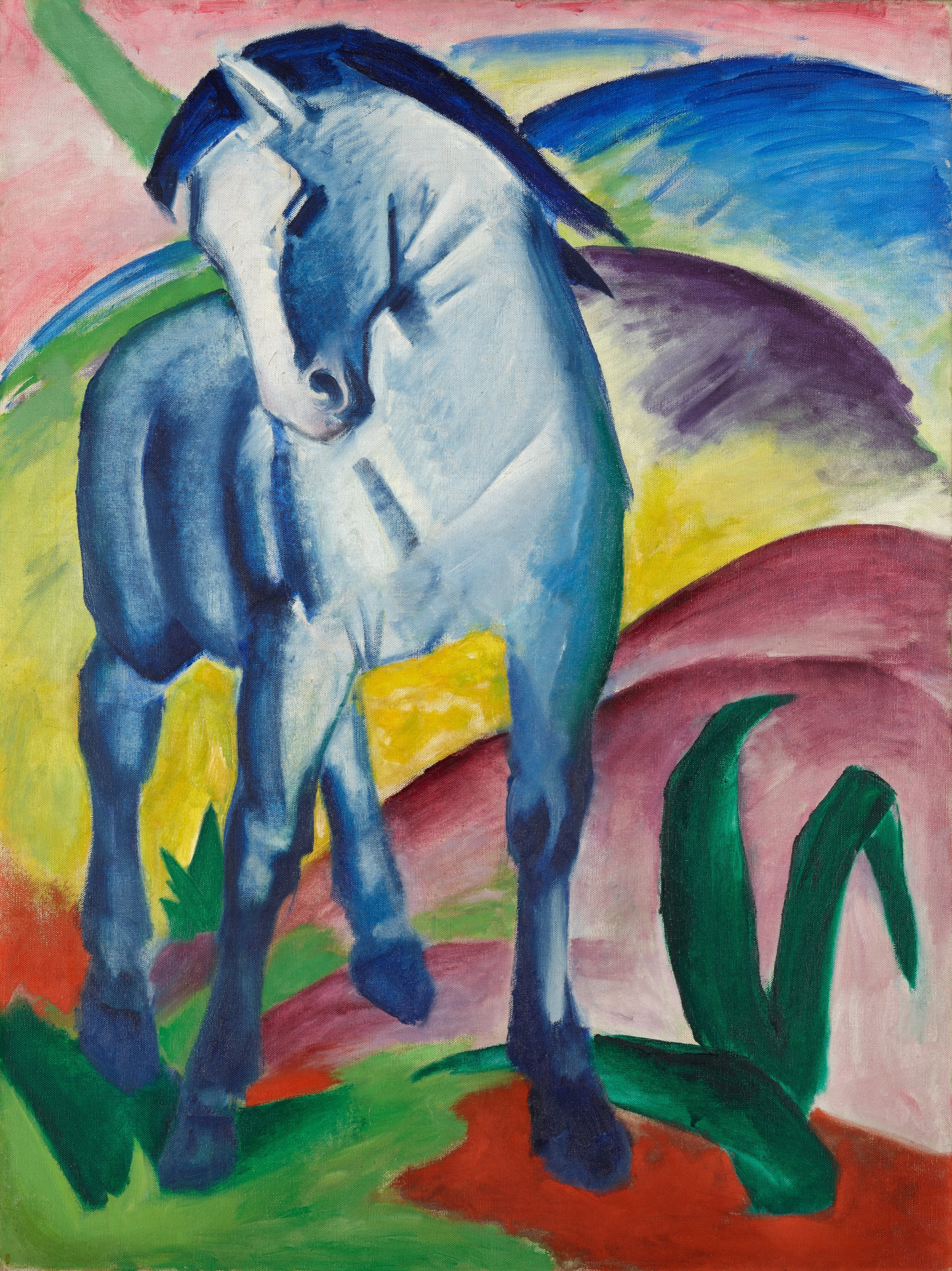
Blaues Pferd I, Blue Horse I (1911)

In 1906, Marc traveled with his elder brother Paul, a Byzantine expert, to Thessaloniki, Mount Athos, and various other Greek locations. A few years later, in 1910, Marc developed an important friendship with the artist August Macke. In 1910 Marc painted Nude with Cat and Grazing Horses, and showed works in the second exhibition of the Neue Künstlervereinigung (New Artists' Association, of which Marc was briefly a member) at the Thannhauser Galleries in Munich.

Morgan Meis writes, "we can say that Franz Marc became an artist in the winter of 1910-11. Something awoke in him, something came together." "Marc made the leap from artistic confusion to profound vision.... His animals began to emerge pure and true from the canvas.... Color was the main thing. Such an explosion of color. Primary colors. Red stands out on the canvas directly contrasting with a swath of blue." In addition, writes Meis, "the element of abstraction gets stronger in Marc's work after ... 1910-11, not weaker."

=== Der Blaue Reiter ===
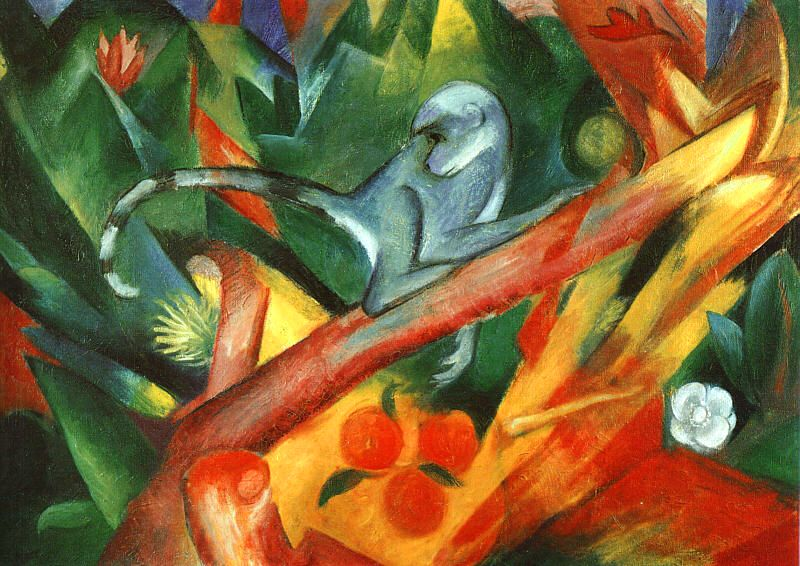
Das Äffchen - The Little Monkey (1912) Lenbachhaus, Munich

In 1911, Marc founded the Der Blaue Reiter journal, which became the center of an artist circle, along with Macke, Wassily Kandinsky, and others who had decided to split off from the Neue Künstlervereinigung movement. Though Marc showed several of his works in the first Der Blaue Reiter exhibition at the Thannhauser Galleries in Munich between December 1911 and January 1912, as it was the apex of the German expressionist movement, the exhibit also showed in Berlin, Cologne, Hagen, and Frankfurt. In Berlin the gallery owner Herwarth Walden displayed Marc alongside works by Paul Klee, Alfred Kubin, and Alexej von Jawlensky. Known as Storm exhibition, in 1912 the collection was exhibited in Wuppertal. The Blue Rider is associated with Munich and the color blue, to which Marc attributed special qualities. The Wilhelmine period in Germany was dominated by academy art institutions. Anton von Werner was among the visual artists considered official taste.

In 1912, Marc met Robert Delaunay, whose use of color and the Cubist method was a major influence on Marc's work. Fascinated by Futurism and Cubism, Marc created art that increasingly was stark in nature, painting natural abstract forms which found spiritual value in color. He painted The Tiger and Red Deer in 1912 and The Tower of Blue Horses, The Foxes, and Fate of the Animals in 1913.

=== Wartime ===
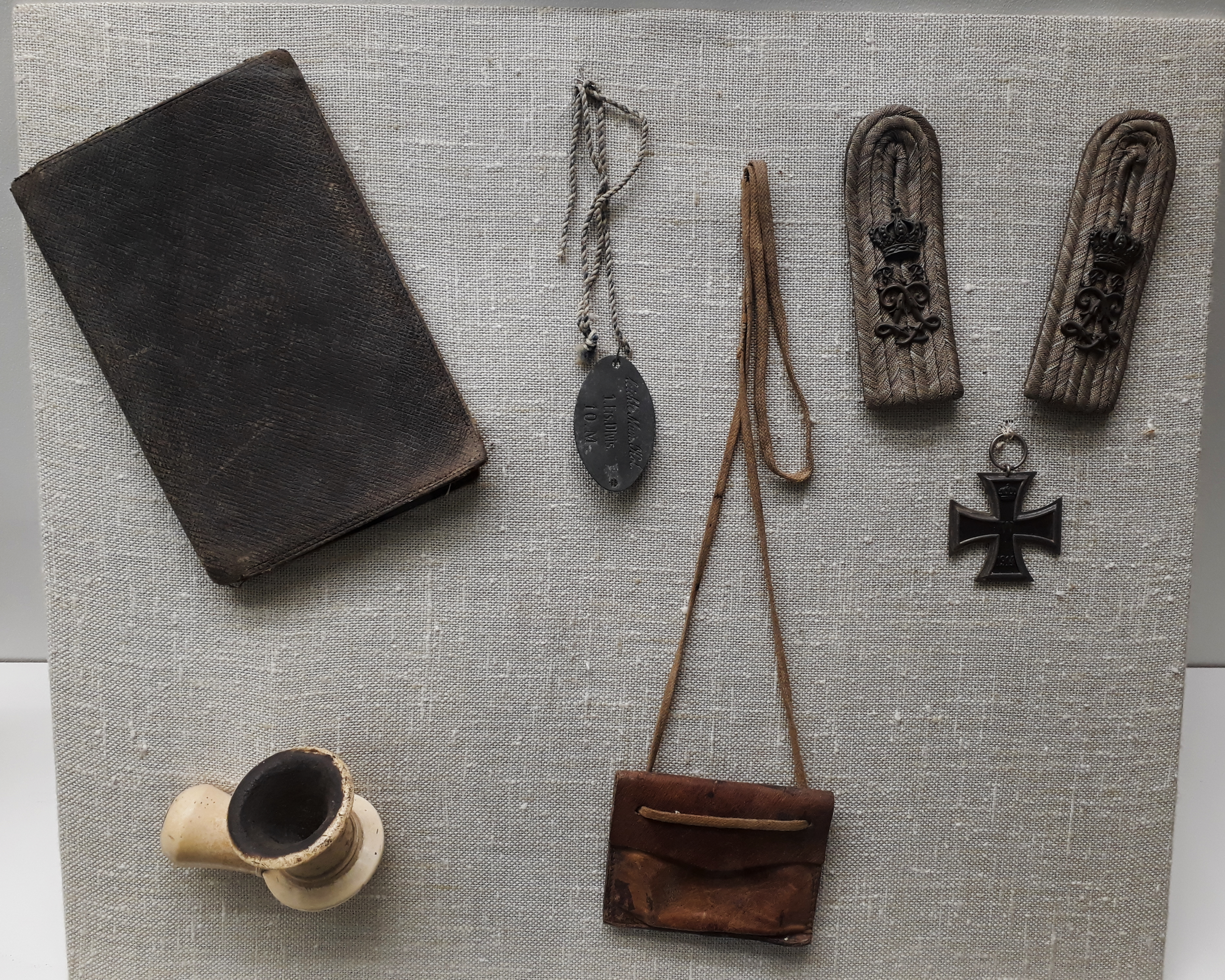
The military person's estate of Franz Marc on display in a museum

With the outbreak of World War I in 1914, Marc was drafted into the Imperial German Army as a cavalryman. By February 1916, as shown in a letter to his wife, he had gravitated to military camouflage. His technique for hiding artillery from aerial observation was to paint canvas covers in broadly pointillist style. He took pleasure in creating a series of nine such tarpaulin covers in styles varying "from Manet to Kandinsky", suspecting that the latter could be the most effective against aircraft flying at 2,000 metres (6,600 ft) or higher.

By 1916, he had been promoted to lieutenant and awarded the Iron Cross.

After mobilization of the German Army, the government identified notable artists to be withdrawn from combat for their own safety. Marc was on the list but was struck in the head and killed instantly by a shell splinter during the Battle of Verdun in 1916 before orders for reassignment could reach him.

== Style ==
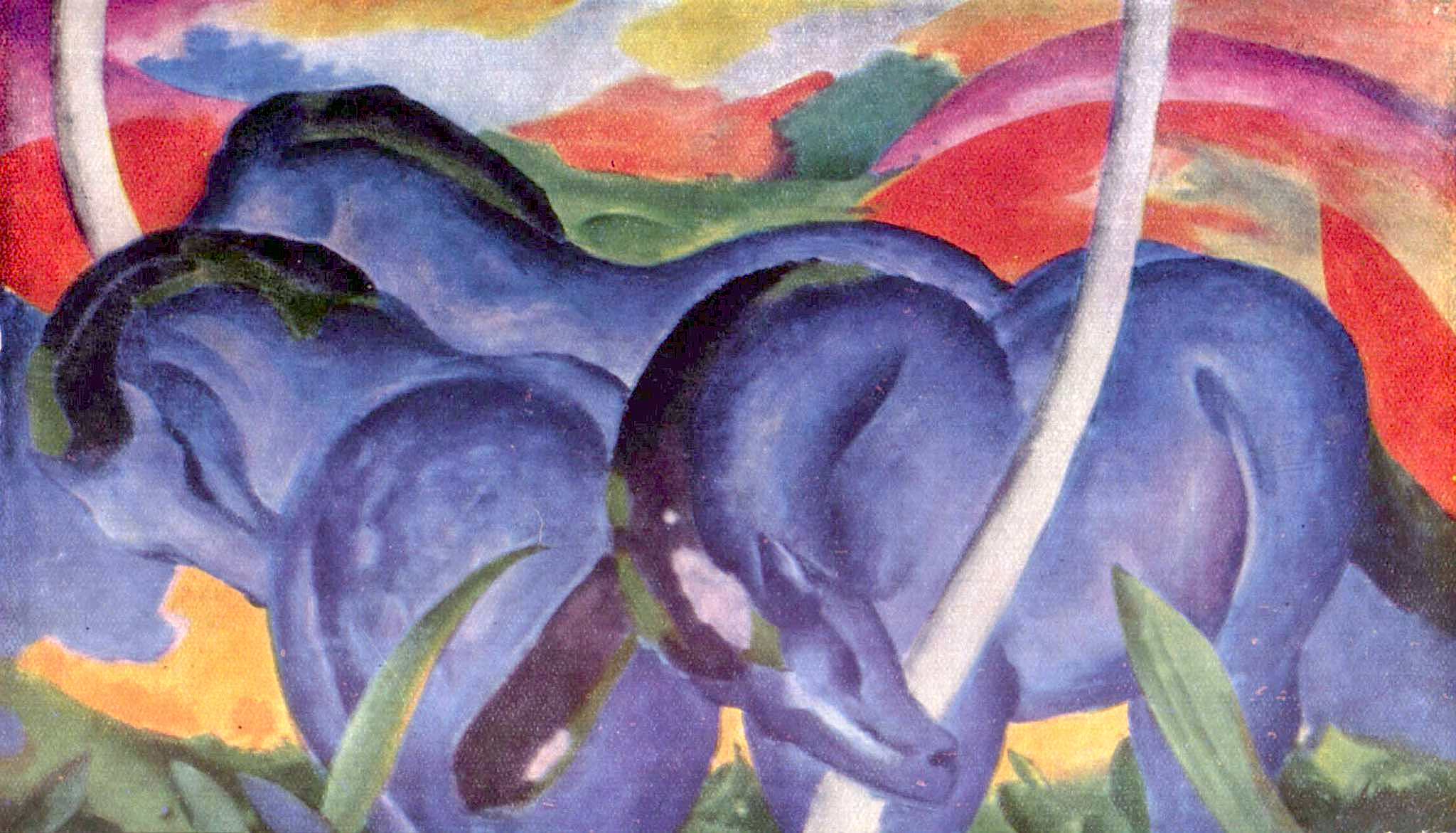
Die großen blauen Pferde, The Large Blue Horses (1911)

Marc made some sixty prints in woodcut and lithography. Most of his mature work portrays animals, usually in natural settings. His work is characterized by bright primary color, an almost cubist portrayal of animals, stark simplicity and a profound sense of emotion. Even in his own time, his work attracted notice in influential circles. Marc gave an emotional meaning or purpose to the colors he used in his work: blue was used to portray masculinity and spirituality, yellow represented feminine joy, and red encased the sound of violence.

One of Marc's best-known paintings is Tierschicksale (Animal Destinies or Fate of the Animals), which hangs in the Kunstmuseum Basel. Marc had completed the work in 1913, when "the tension of impending cataclysm had pervaded society", as one art historian noted. On the back of the canvas, Marc wrote, "Und Alles Sein ist flammend Leid" ("And all being is flaming agony"). Serving in World War I, Marc wrote to his wife about the painting, "[it] is like a premonition of this war – horrible and shattering. I can hardly conceive that I painted it."

== Nazi Germany and the seizure of so-called "degenerate" art ==
After the National Socialists took power, they suppressed modern art; in 1936 and 1937, the Nazis condemned the late Marc as an entarteter Künstler (degenerate artist) and ordered approximately 130 of his works removed from exhibition in German museums. The Blue Horses was auctioned off at the infamous Theodor Fischer gallery "degenerate art" sale in Lucerne, on 29 June 1939, and acquired by the Musée des Beaux-Arts in Liège. His painting Landscape With Horses was discovered in 2012 along with more than a thousand other paintings, in the Munich apartment of Cornelius Gurlitt whose father, Hildebrand Gurlitt, was one of Hitler's four official art dealers of Modernist art the Nazis called "degenerate" which the Nazis sold or traded to raise cash for the Third Reich.

In 2017, the family of Kurt Grawi demanded the restitution of Marc's painting The Foxes (1913) from Düsseldorf's Kunstpalast. Grawi, a German Jewish banker who had owned the painting before the Nazis rose to power was arrested on Kristallnacht and incarcerated in Sachsenhausen concentration camp in 1938, before he managed to flee to Chile in 1939. The painting passed through Galerie Nierendorf, and William and Charlotte Dieterle, according to the German Lost Art Foundation. In 2021, the German Advisory Commission recommended that the city of Düsseldorf restitute the painting to Grawi's heirs; this was done, and the painting was sold at Christie's by Grawi's heirs in 2022.

== Legacy and honors ==
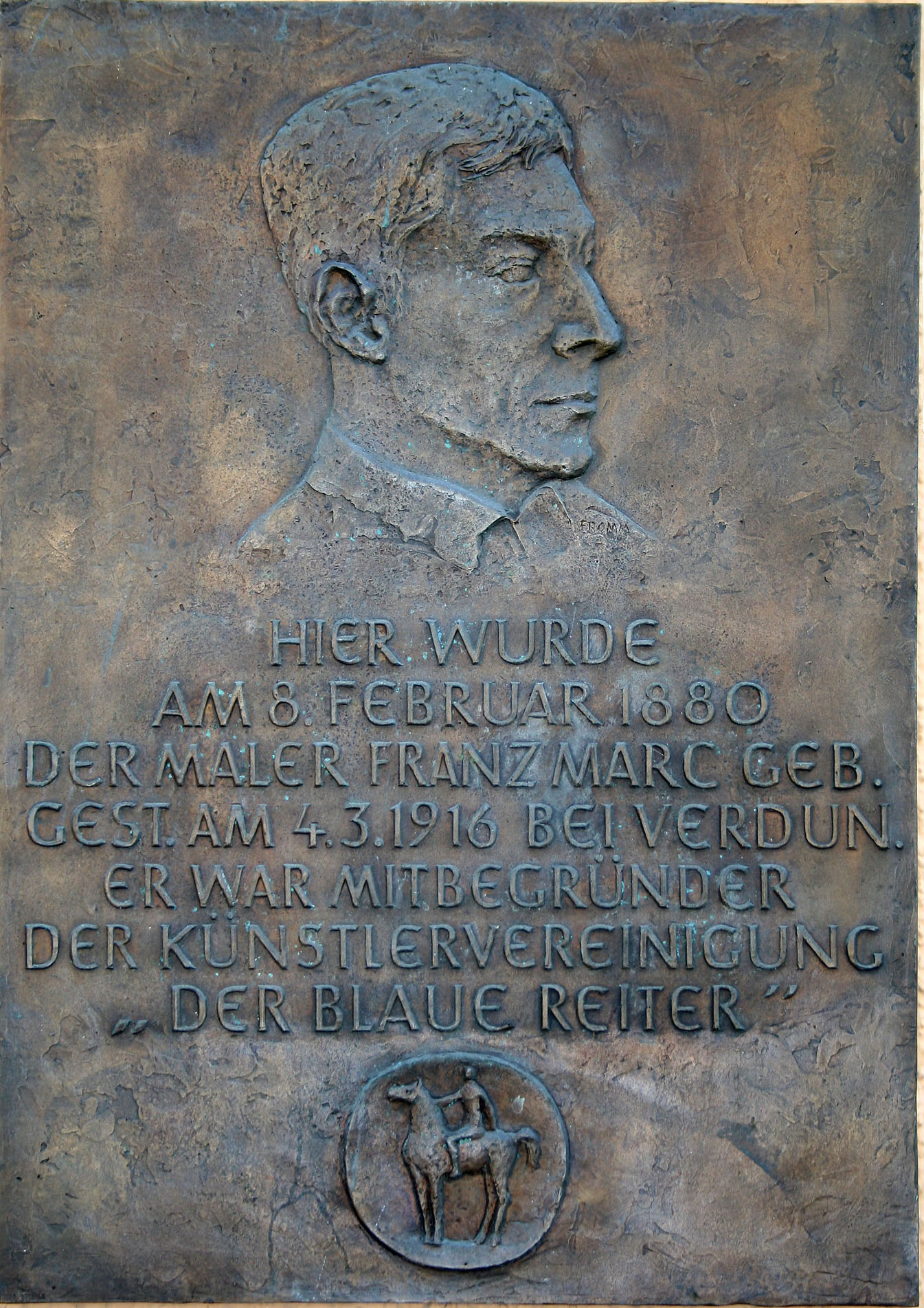
Plaque on the house where Marc was born

Marc's family house in Munich is marked with a historical plaque. The Franz Marc Museum which is located in Kochel am See, opened in 1986 and is dedicated to the artist's life and work. It houses many of his paintings, and also works by other contemporary artists.

In October 1998, several of Marc's paintings garnered record prices at Christie's art auction house in London, including Rote Rehe I (Red Deer I), which sold for $3.3 million. In October 1999, his Der Wasserfall (The Waterfall) was sold by Sotheby's in London for $5.06 million. This price set a record for Franz Marc's work and for twentieth-century German painting. In 2008, the former record was again broken when Marc's Weidende Pferde III (Grazing Horses III) was sold for £12,340,500 ($24,376,190) at Sotheby's. This record was again beaten by the £42.6m sale of The Foxes in 2022.

== Public collections ==
Among the public collections holding works by Franz Marc are:

- Museum de Fundatie, Zwolle, Netherlands
- Solomon R. Guggenheim Museum, New York
- Franz Marc Museum in Kochel am See
- Lenbachhaus, Munich
- Detroit Institute of Arts

== Selected images ==
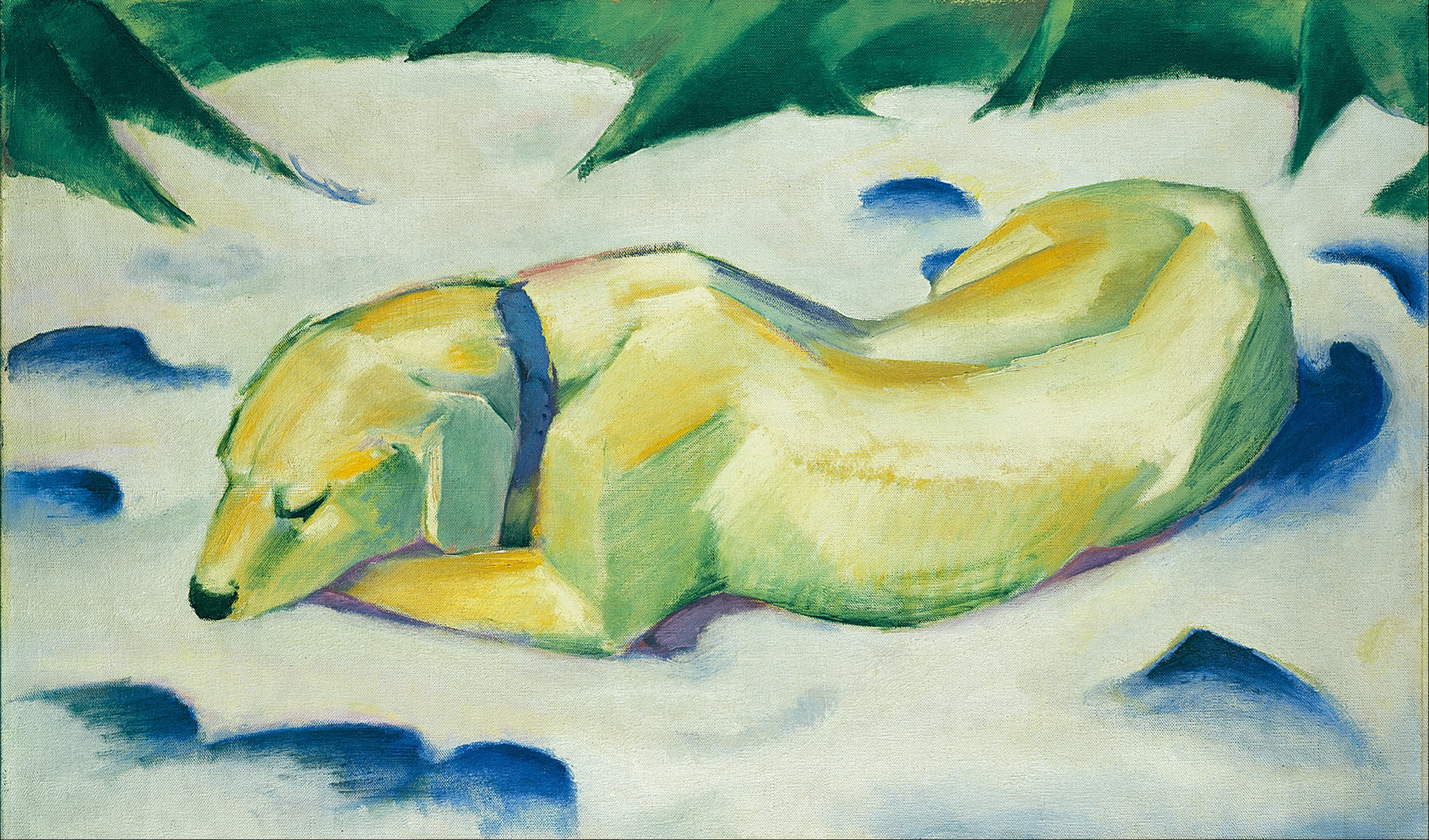
Liegender Hund im Schnee, Dog Lying in the Snow (1911), Städel Museum, Frankfurt am Main

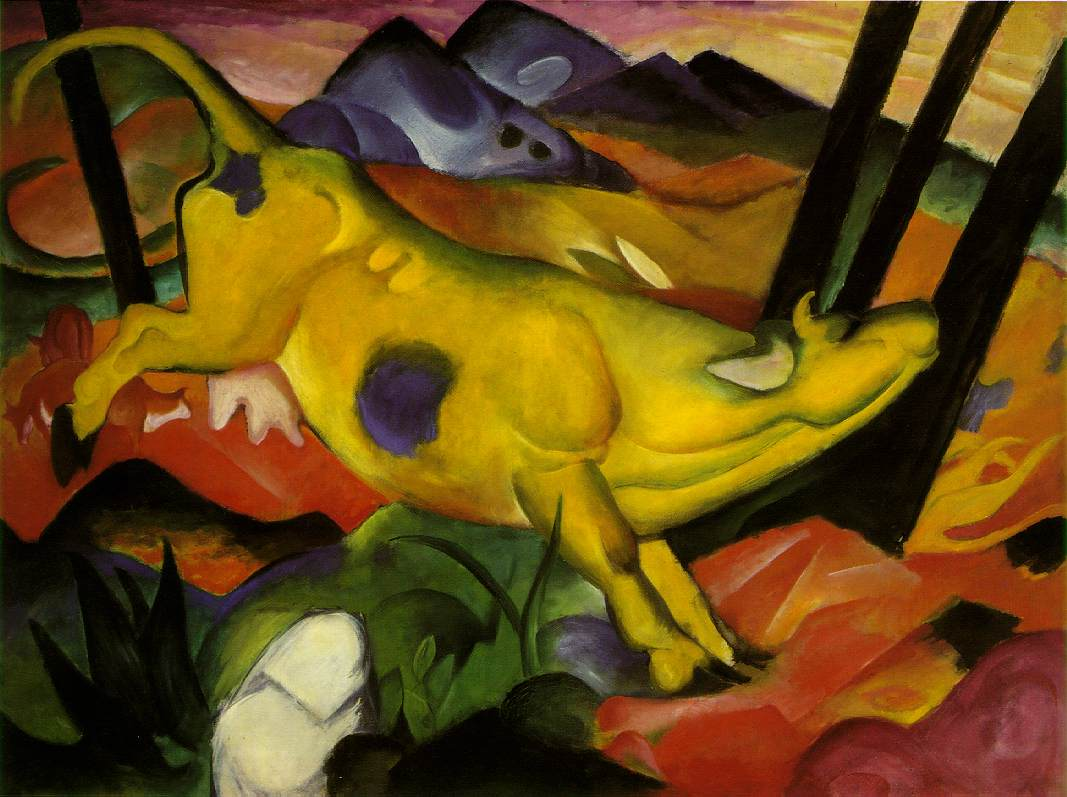
Die gelbe Kuh, The Yellow Cow (1911), Solomon R. Guggenheim Museum, New York

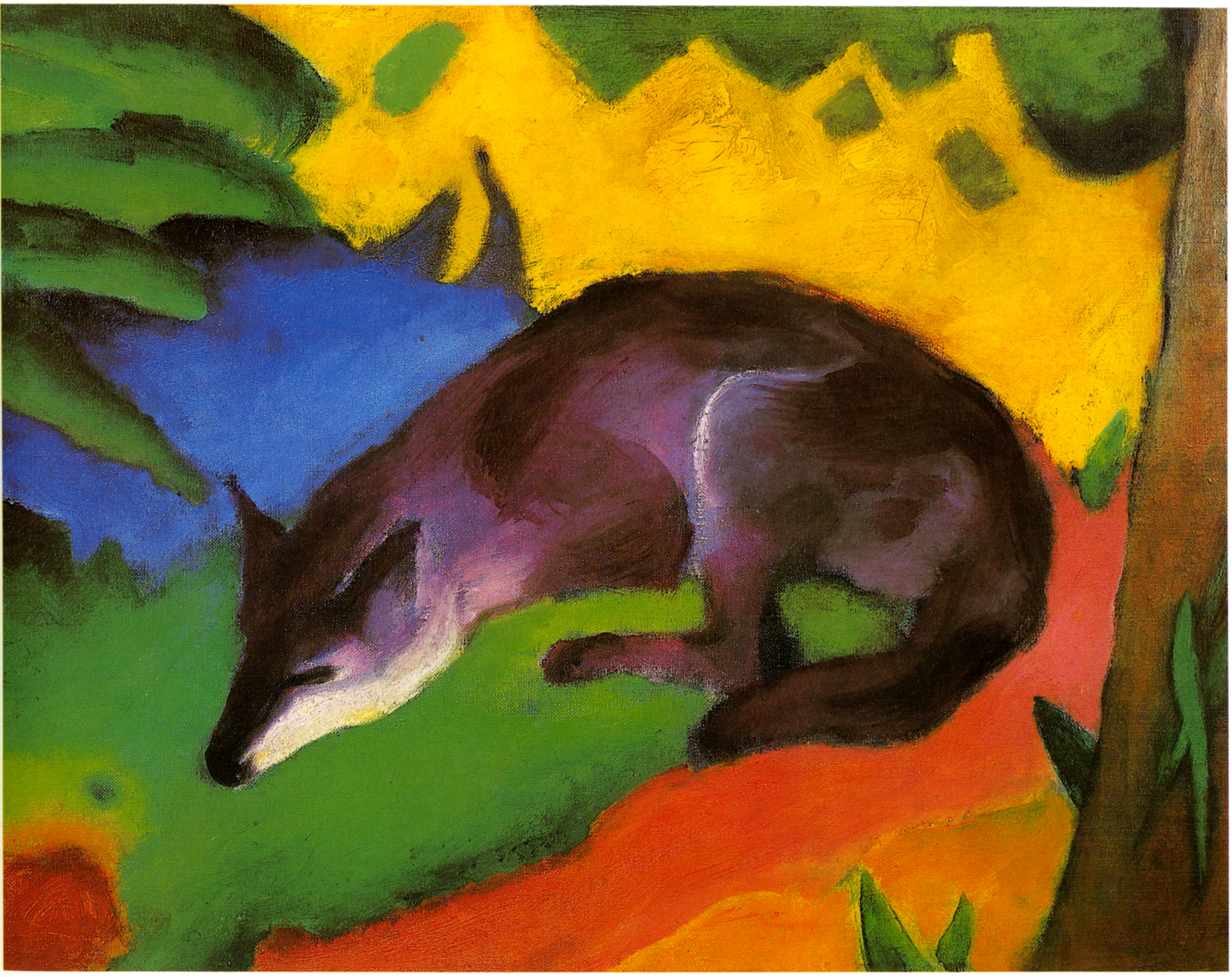
Fuchs, Fox (1911), Von der Heydt Museum in Wuppertal

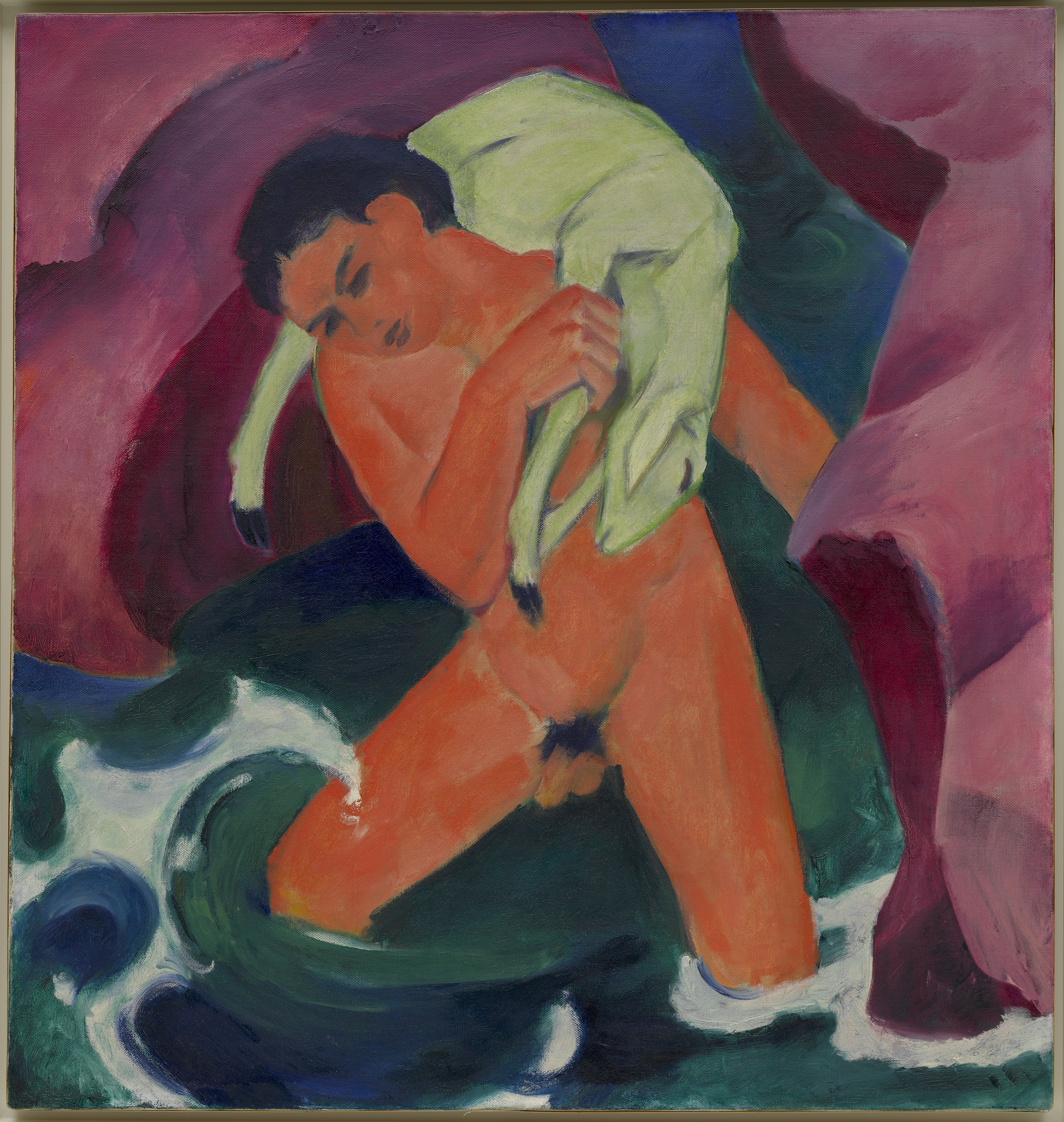
Knabe mit Lamm; Der gute Hirte, Young Boy with a Lamb; The Good Shepherd (1911), Solomon R. Guggenheim Museum, New York

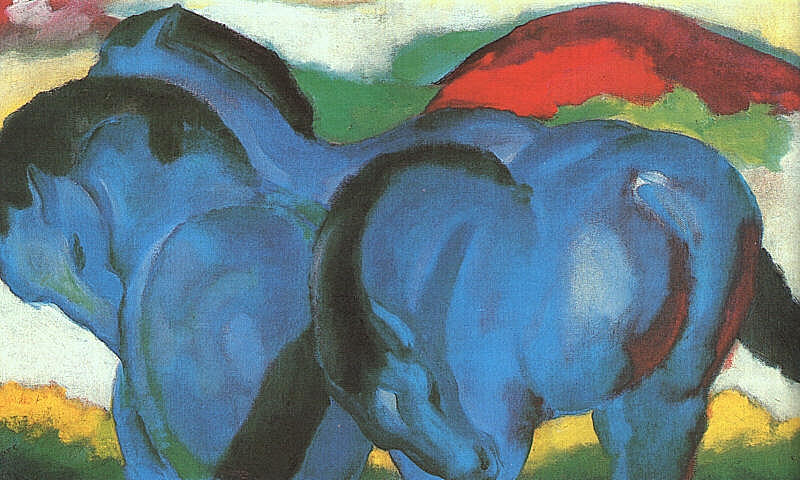
Die kleinen blauen Pferde, The Little Blue Horses (1911), Staatsgalerie Stuttgart

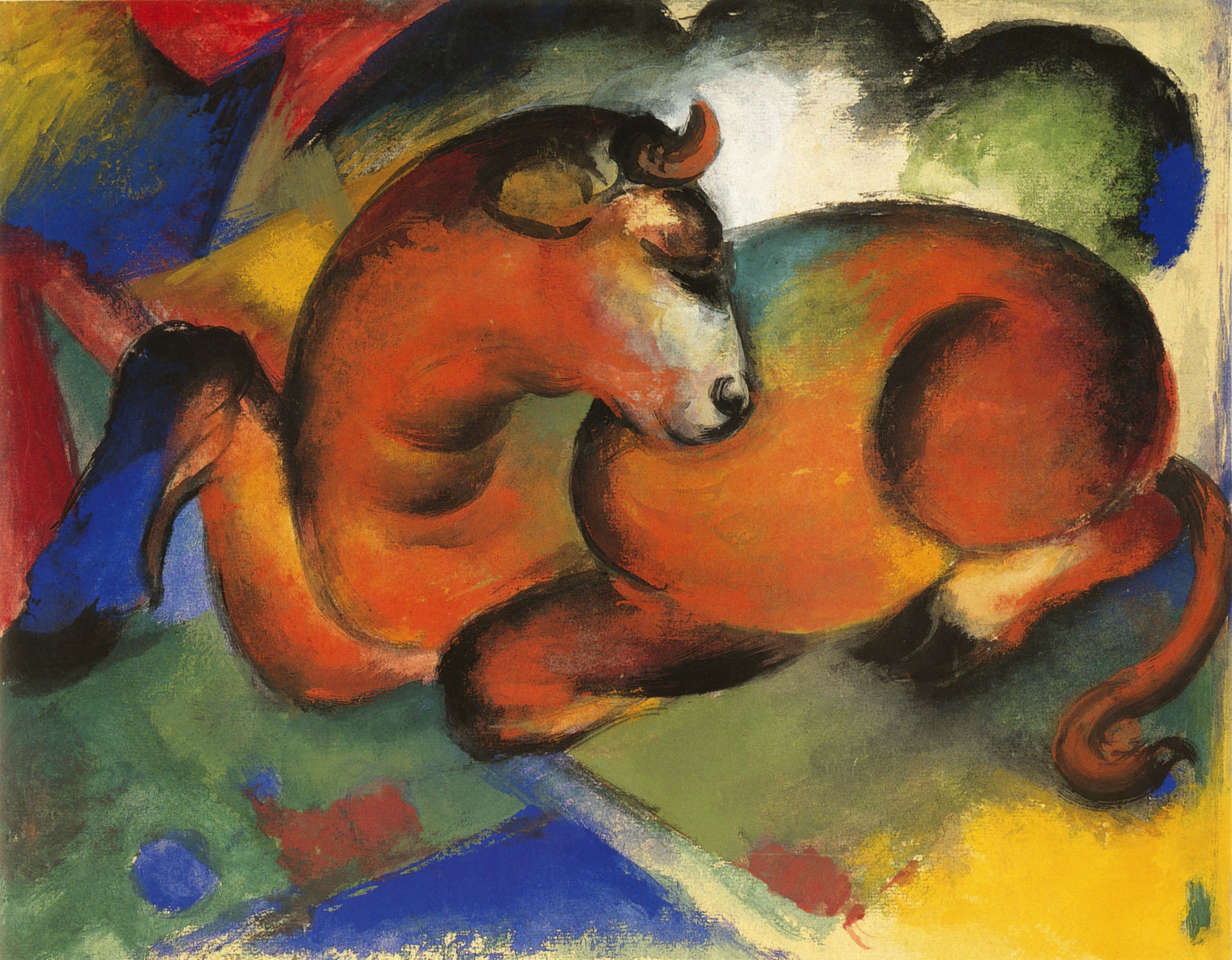
Roter Stier, Red Bull (1912), Pushkin Museum in Moscow

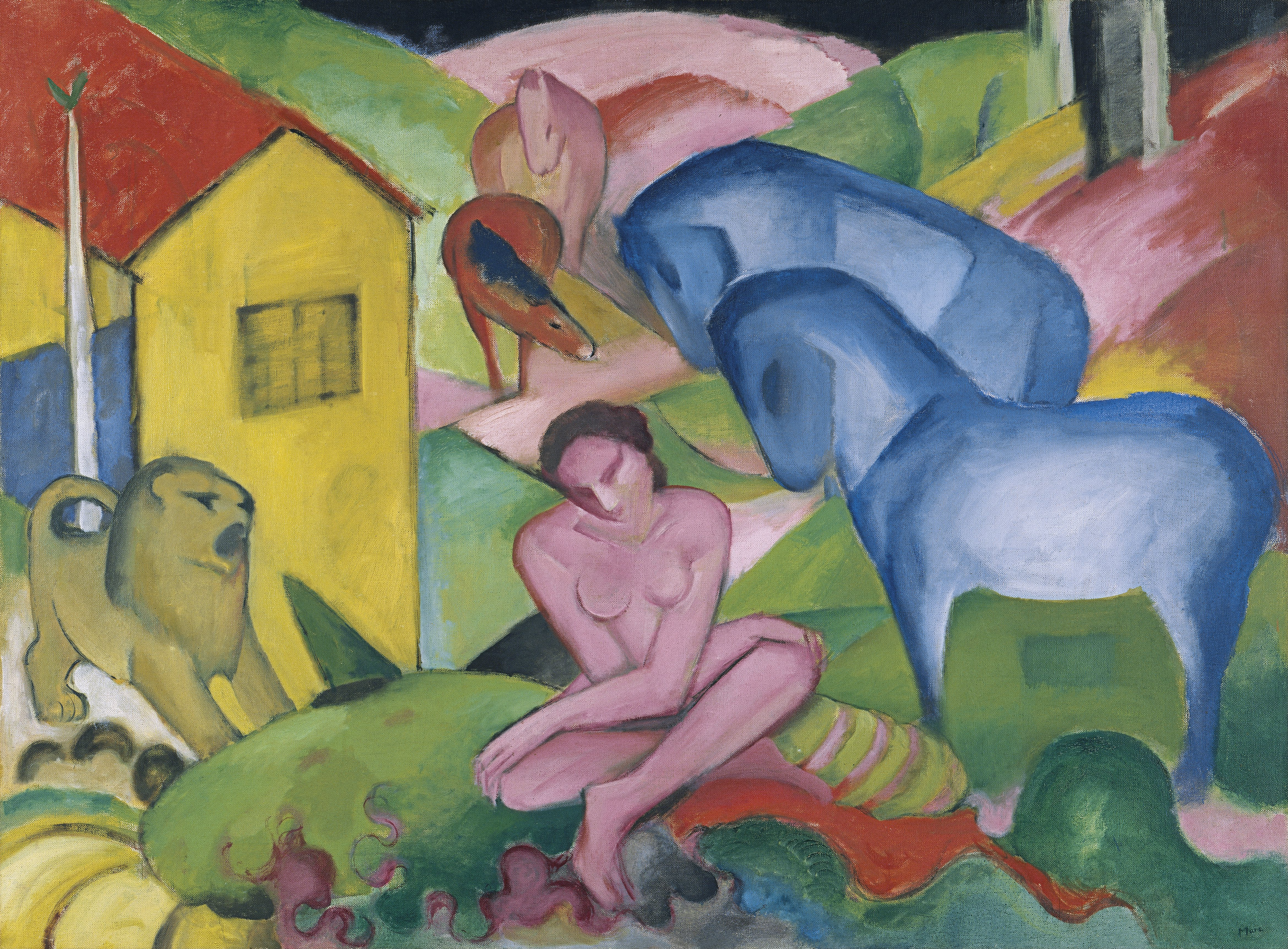
Der Traum, The Dream (1912), Thyssen-Bornemisza Museum in Madrid

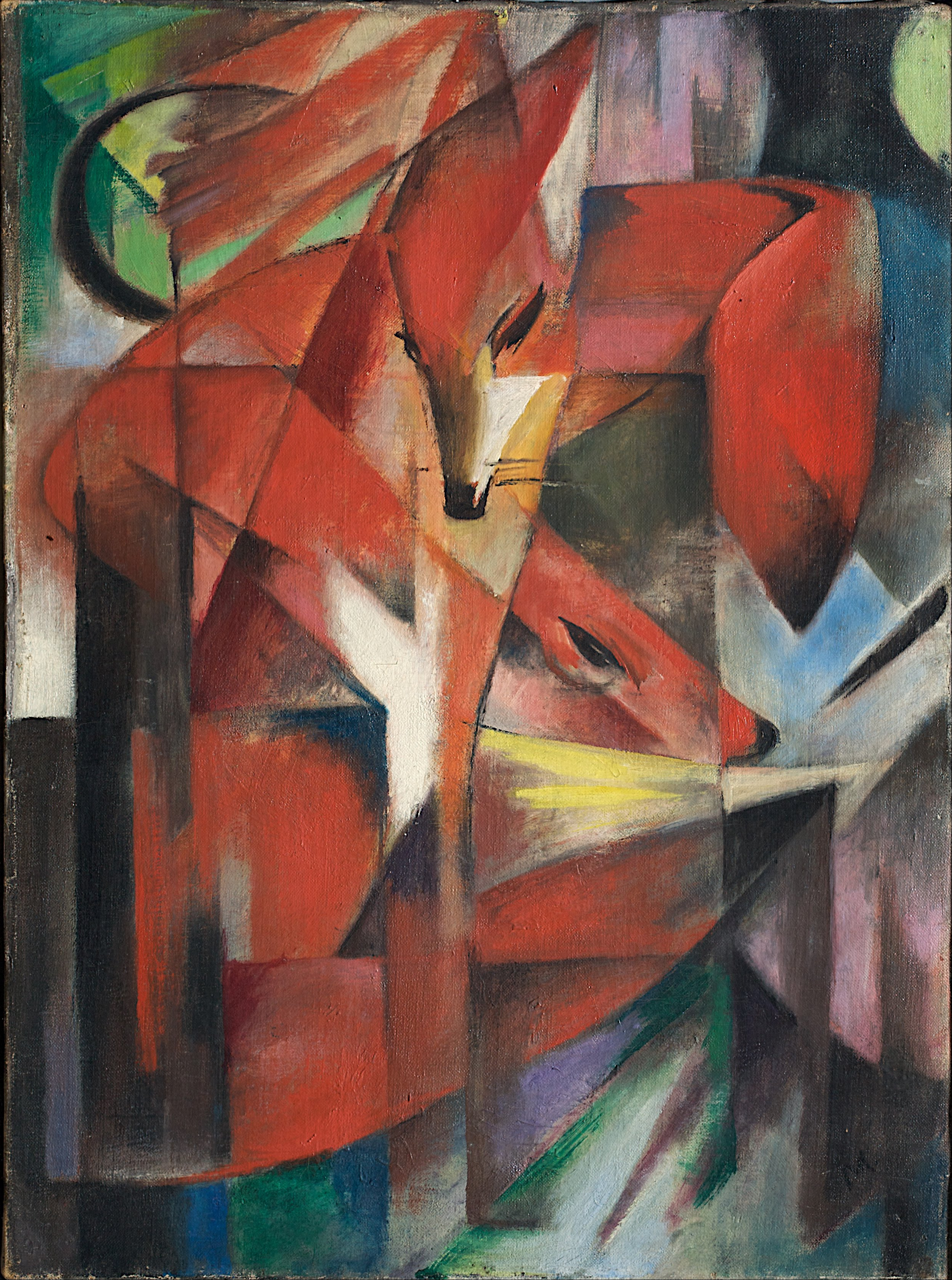
Die Füchse, The Foxes (1913), private collection

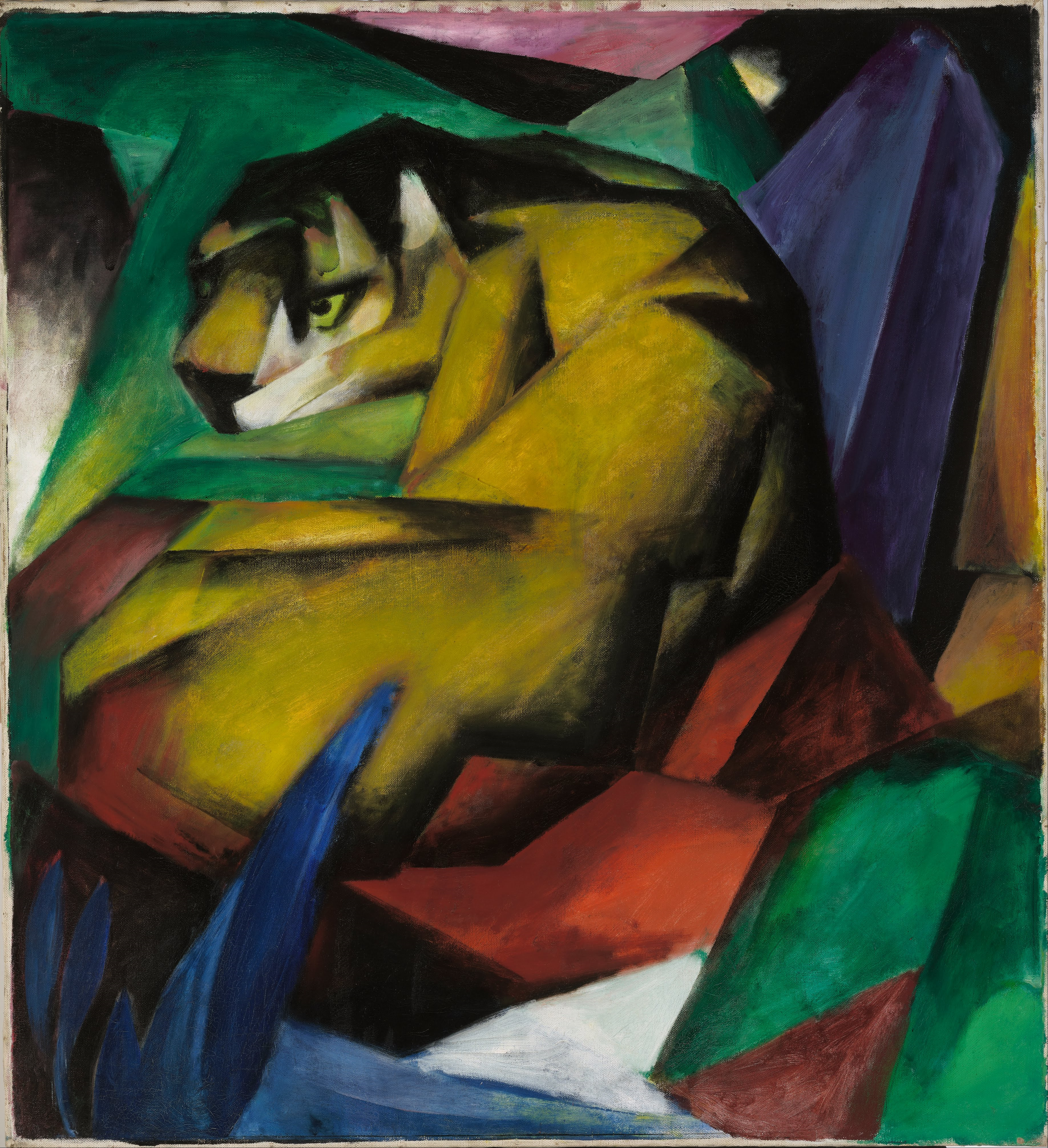
Der Tiger, The Tiger (1912), Lenbachhaus in Munich

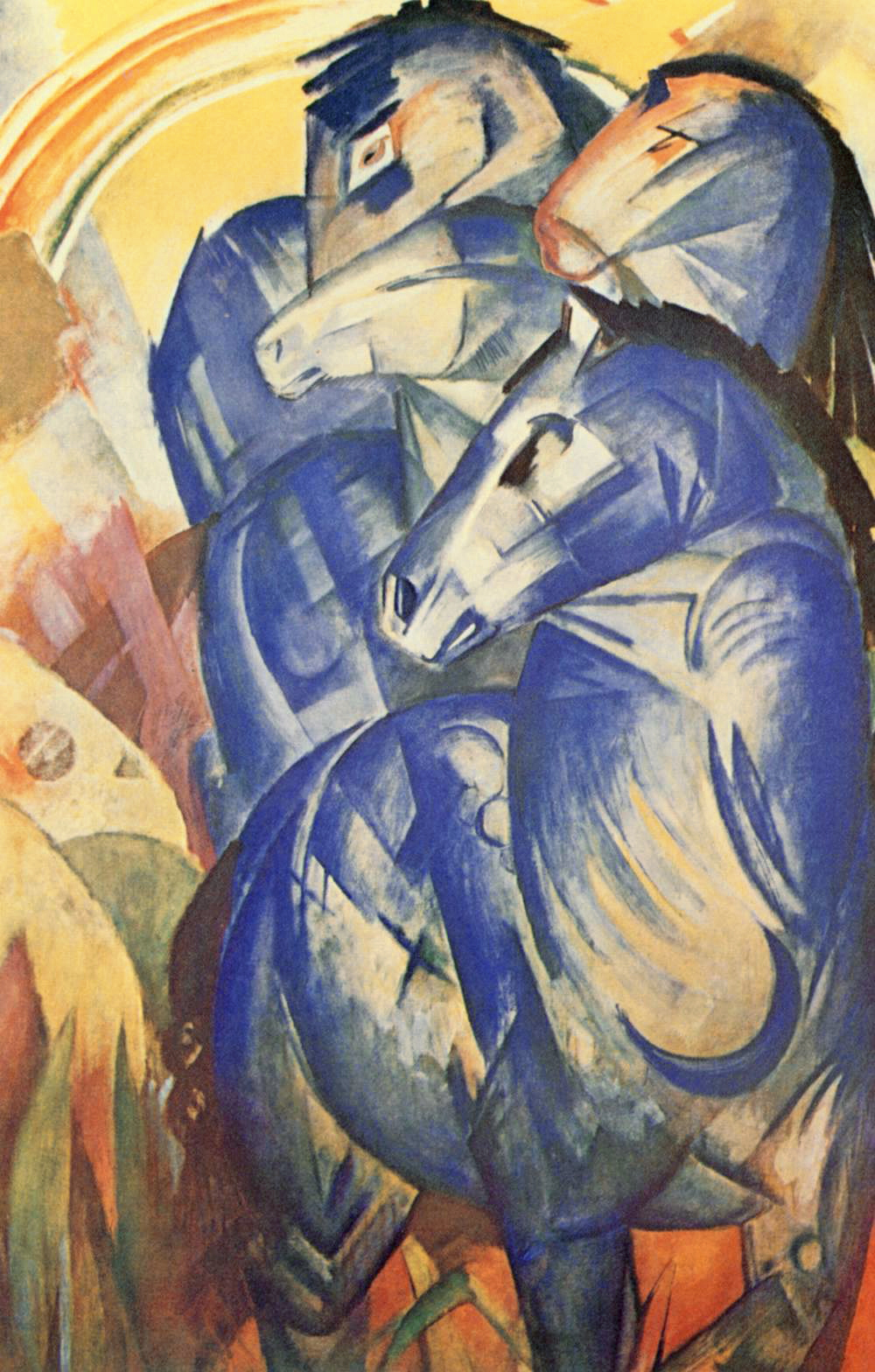
Der Turm der blauen Pferde,
The Tower of Blue Horses (1913),
missing since 1945

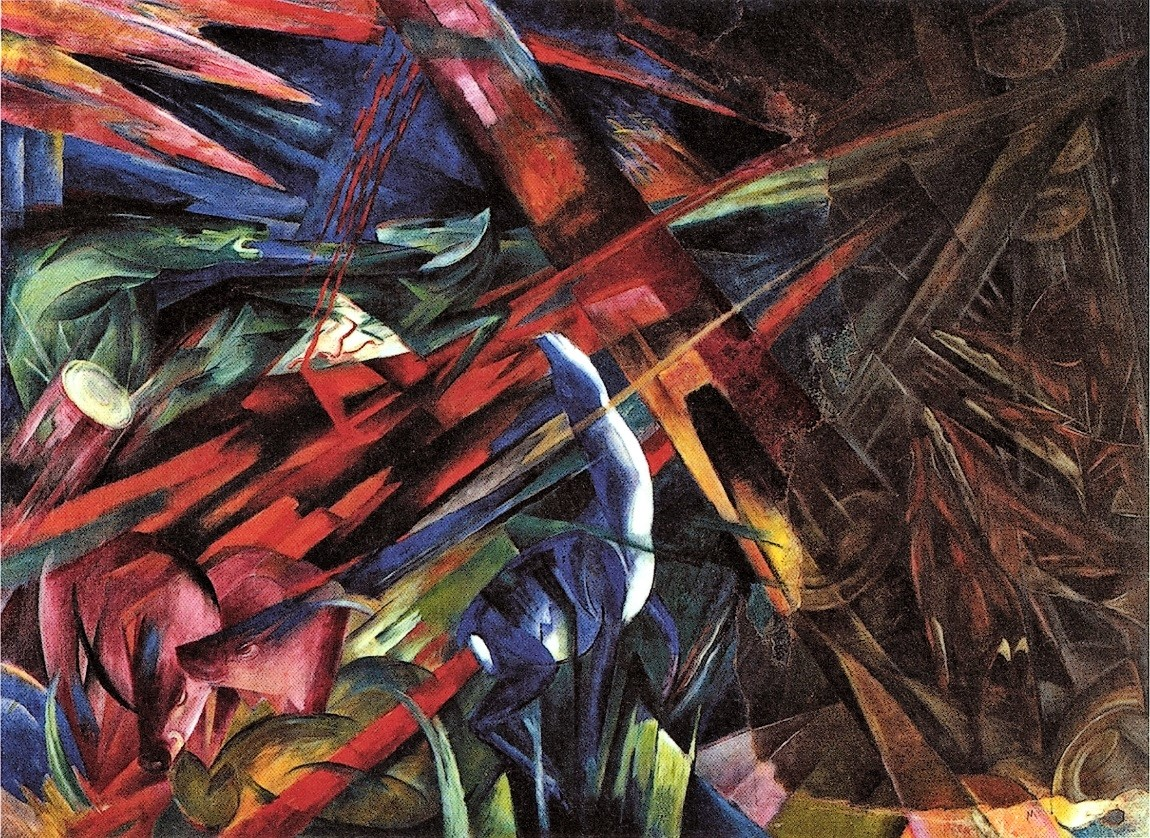
Tierschicksale, Fate of the Animals (1913), Kunstmuseum Basel in Basel

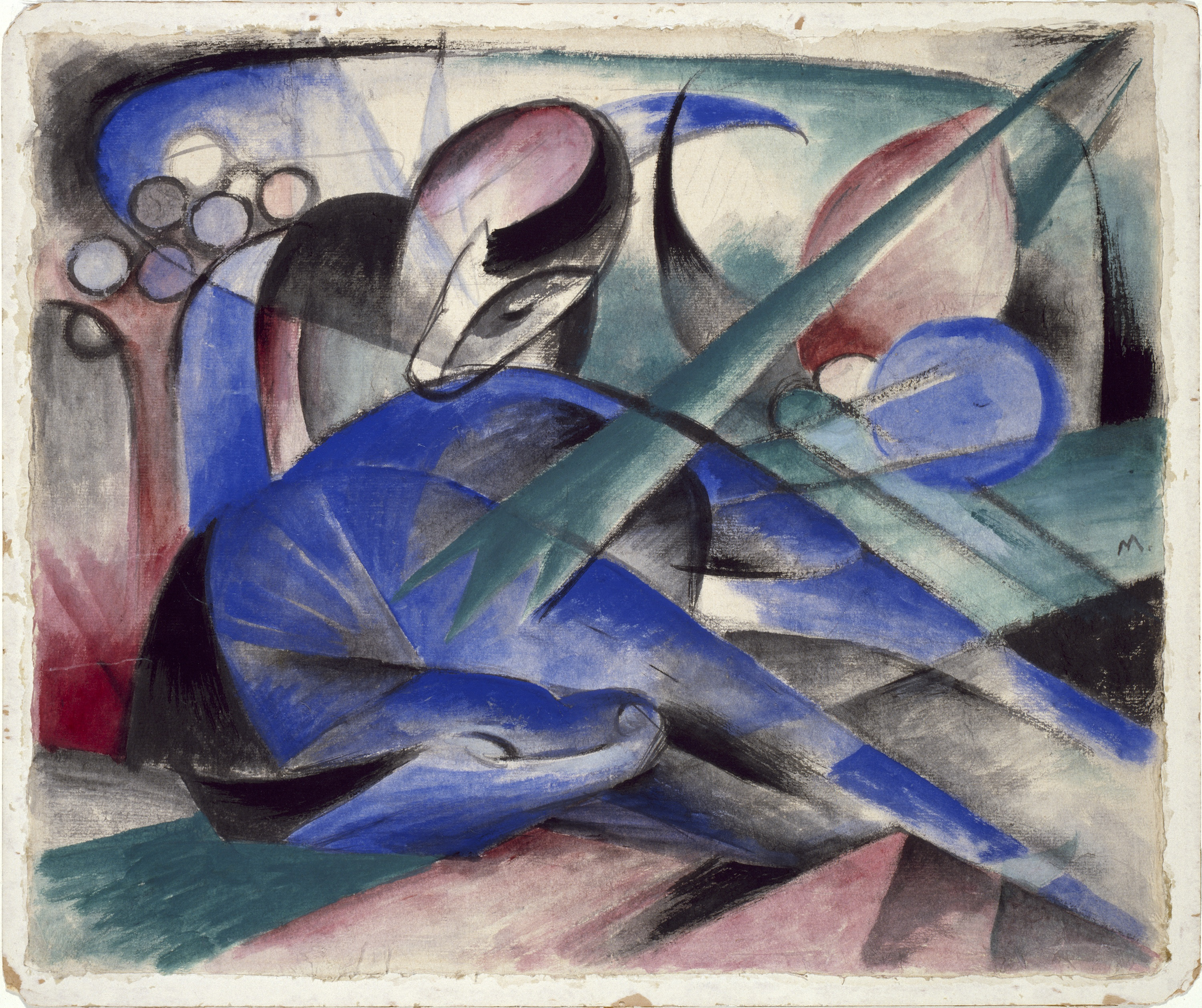
Träumendes Pferd, Dreaming Horse (1913), Solomon R. Guggenheim Museum, New York

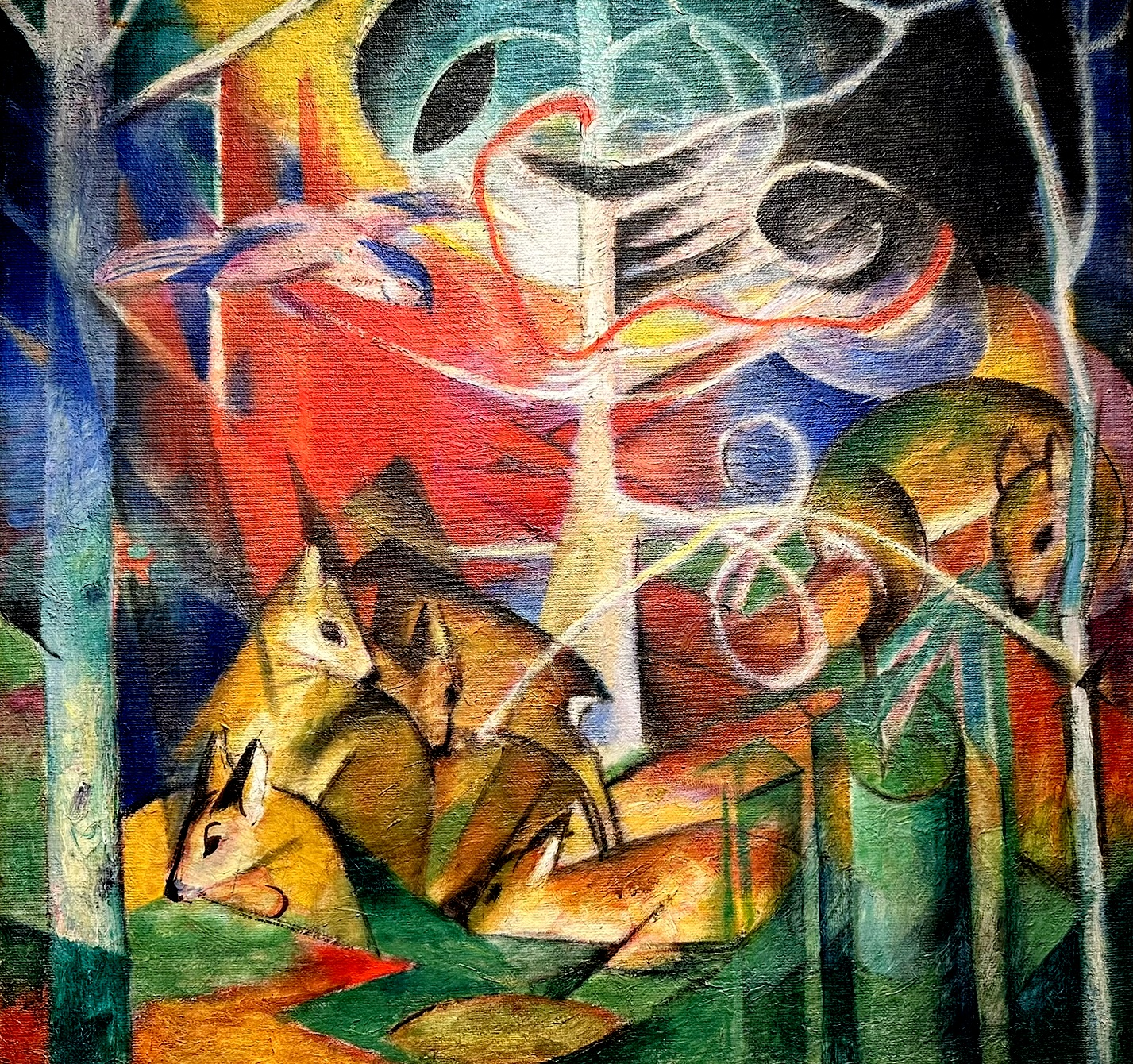
Rehe im Walde I, Deer in Forest 1 (1913), The Phillips Collection

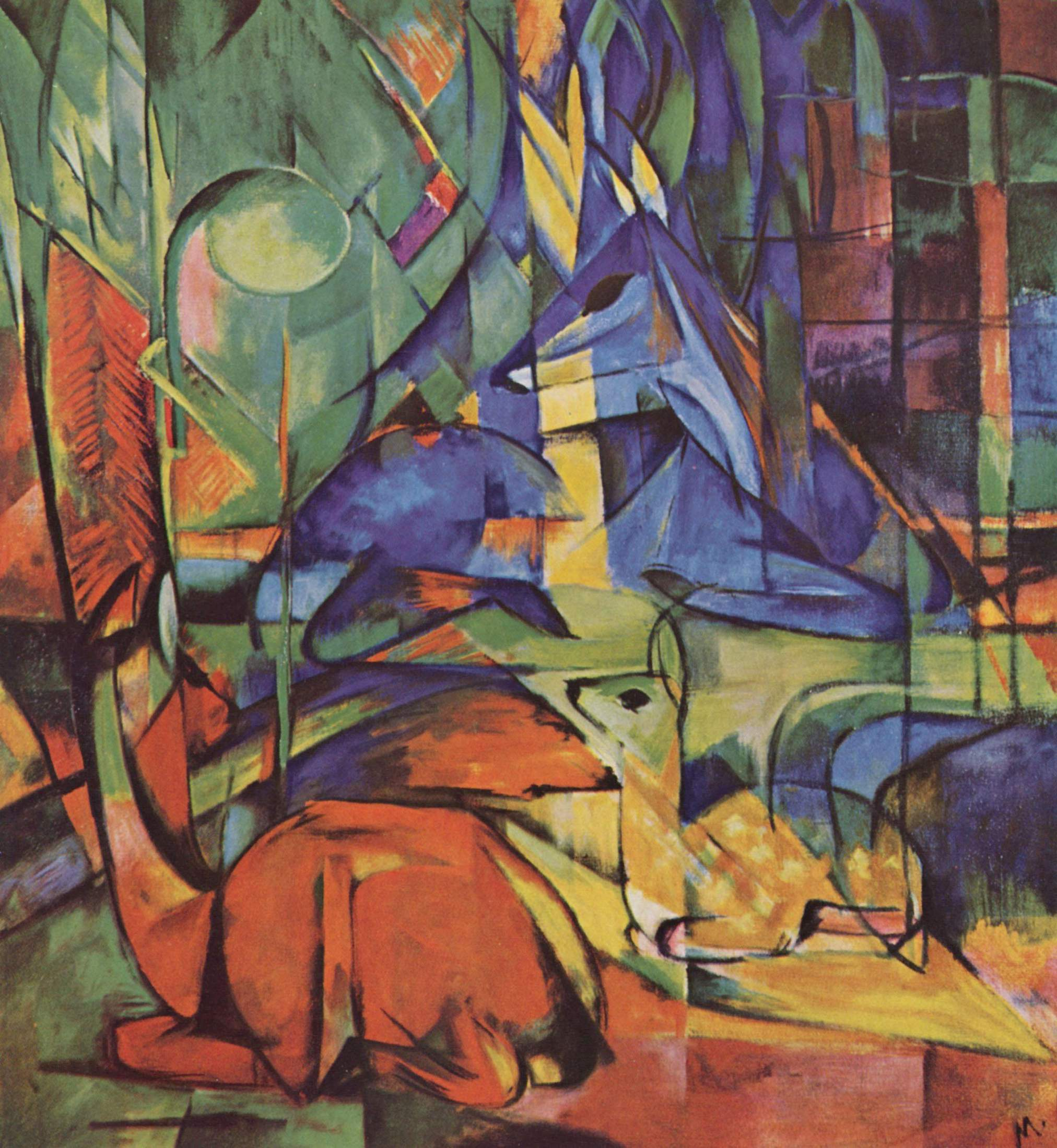
Rehe im Walde (II), Deer in the Forest II (1914)

== See also ==
- The Tower of Blue Horses, 1913, missing since 1945
