= Haldenstrasse =

Street in Lucerne, Switzerland

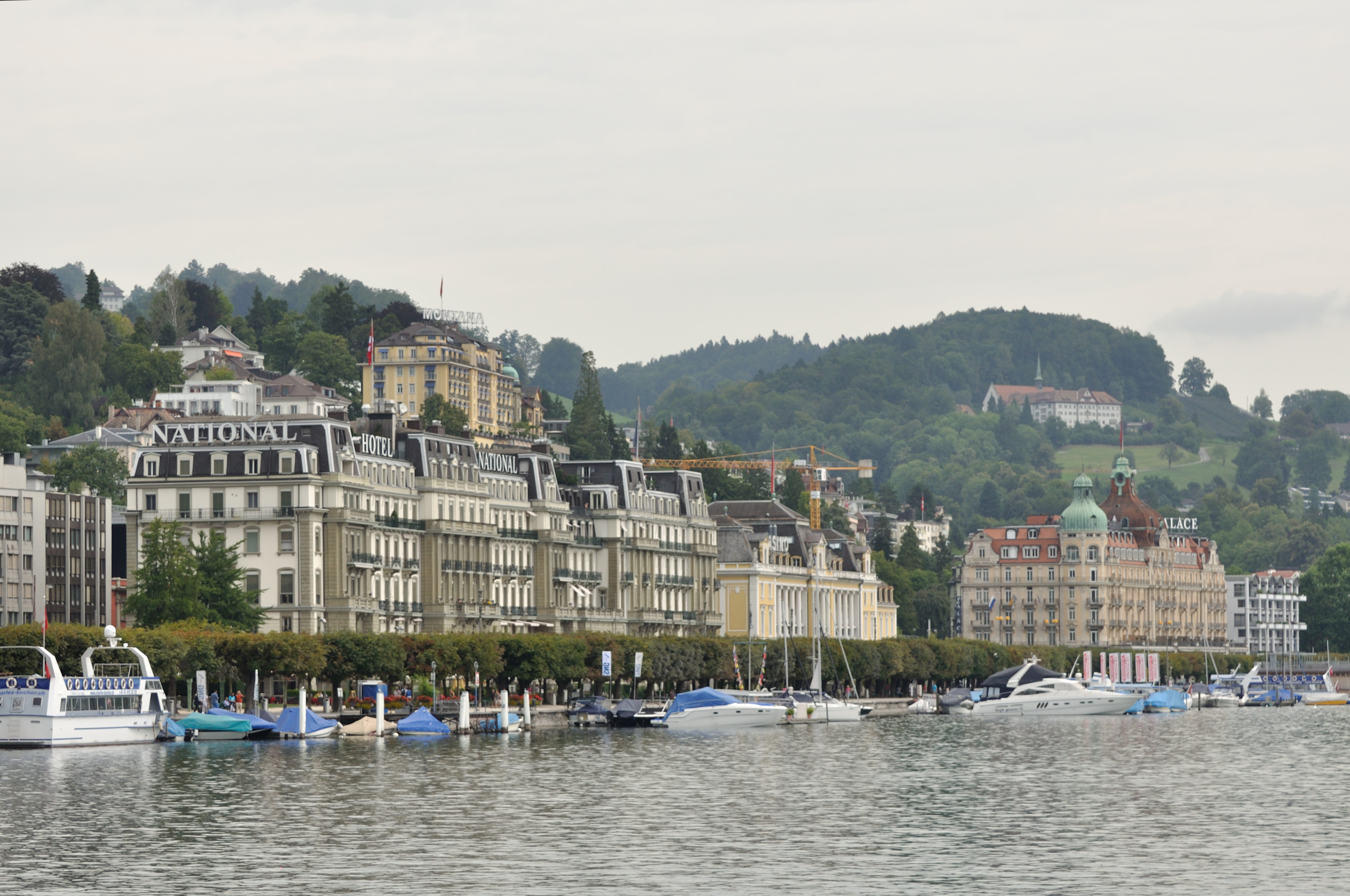
Grand Hotel National on Haldenstrasse.

Haldenstrasse is a street in Lucerne, Switzerland, on the shores of Lake Lucerne.

The street is the location of several notable buildings, including the Grand Hotel National, the Hotel Palace Luzern and the Grand Casino Luzern.
