= Paul Klee =

Swiss-German painter (1879–1940)

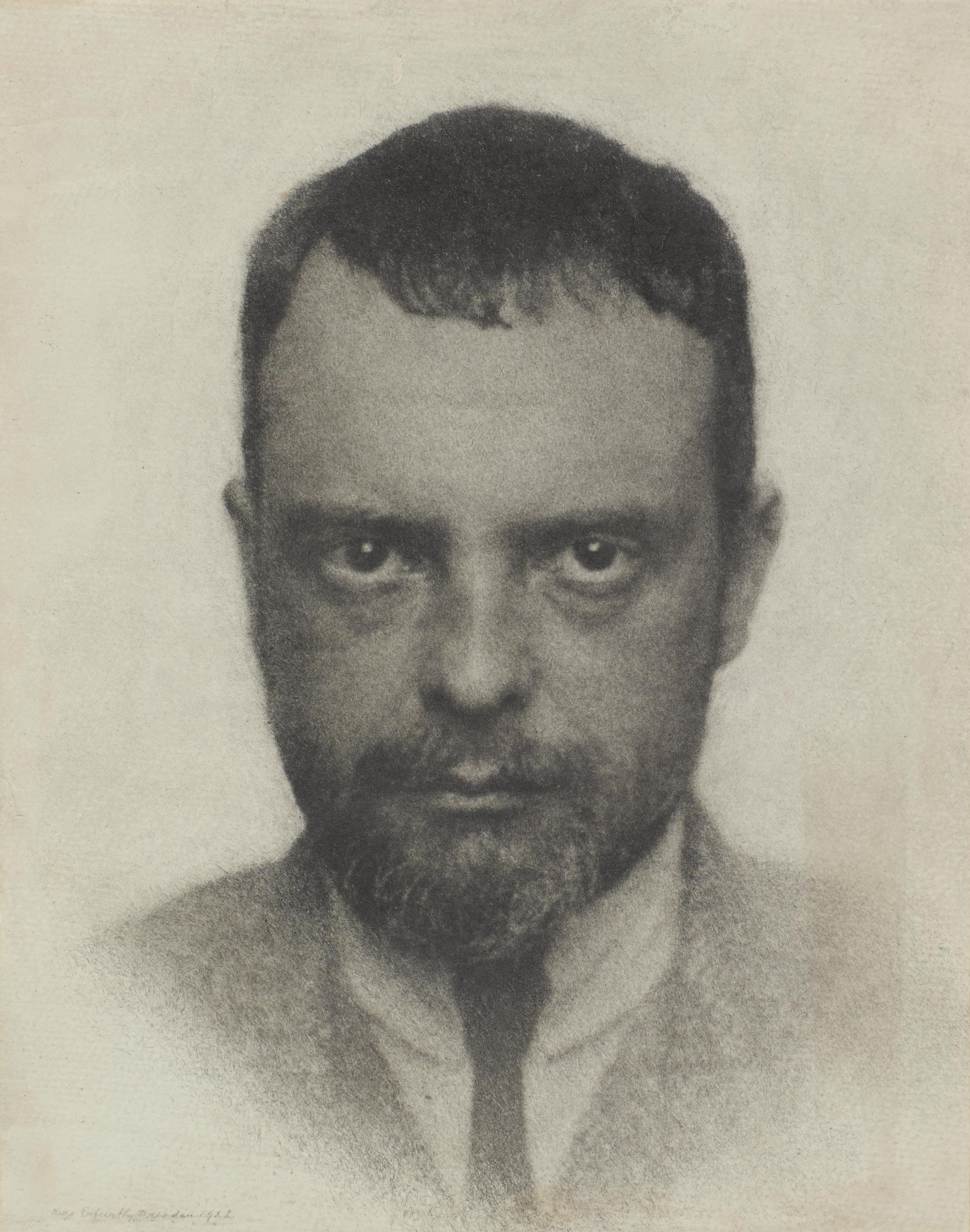
- Portrait of Paul Klee, Hugo Erfurth (1922)
- Born: 18 December 1879; Münchenbuchsee, Bern, Switzerland
- Died: 29 June 1940 (aged 60); Muralto, Ticino, Switzerland
- Education: Academy of Fine Arts, Munich
- Known for: Painting, drawing, watercolor, printmaking
- Notable work: More than 10,000 paintings, drawings, and etchings, including Angelus Novus (1920), Senecio and Twittering Machine (1922), Fish Magic (1925), Viaducts Break Ranks (1937).
- Movement: Expressionism, Bauhaus, Surrealism
- Spouse: Lily Klee (m. 1906)
- Children: Felix Klee

Paul Klee (German: [ˈpaʊ̯l ˈkleː]; 18 December 1879 – 29 June 1940) was a Swiss-born German artist. His highly individual style was influenced by movements in art that included expressionism, cubism, and surrealism.

Klee was a natural draftsman who experimented with and eventually deeply explored color theory, writing about it extensively. His lectures Writings on Form and Design Theory (Schriften zur Form und Gestaltungslehre), published in English as the Paul Klee Notebooks, are held to be as important for modern art as Leonardo da Vinci's A Treatise on Painting was for the Renaissance.

He and his colleague, Russian painter Wassily Kandinsky, both taught at the Bauhaus school of art, design and architecture in Germany. His works reflect his dry humor and his sometimes childlike perspective, his personal moods and beliefs, and his musicality.

== Early life and training ==
First of all, the art of living; then as my ideal profession, poetry and philosophy, and as my real profession, plastic arts; in the last resort, for lack of income, illustrations.

— Paul Klee

Paul Klee was born in Münchenbuchsee, Switzerland, as the second child of German music teacher Hans Wilhelm Klee (1849–1940) and Swiss singer Ida Marie Klee, née Frick (1855–1921).^{[a]} His sister Mathilde (died 6 December 1953) was born on 28 January 1876 in Walzenhausen. Their father came from Tann and studied singing, piano, organ and violin at the Stuttgart Conservatory, where he met his future wife Ida Frick. Hans Wilhelm Klee was active as a music teacher at the Bern State Seminary in Hofwil near Bern until 1931. Klee was able to develop his music skills as his parents encouraged and inspired him throughout his life.

In 1880, his family moved to Bern, where they eventually, in 1897, after a number of changes of residence, moved into their own house in the Kirchenfeld district. From 1886 to 1890, Klee attended primary school and received, at the age of seven, violin classes at the Municipal Music School. He was so talented on violin that, aged 11, he received an invitation to play as an extraordinary member of the Bern Music Association. His other hobbies, drawing and writing poems, were not fostered in the same way as music was.

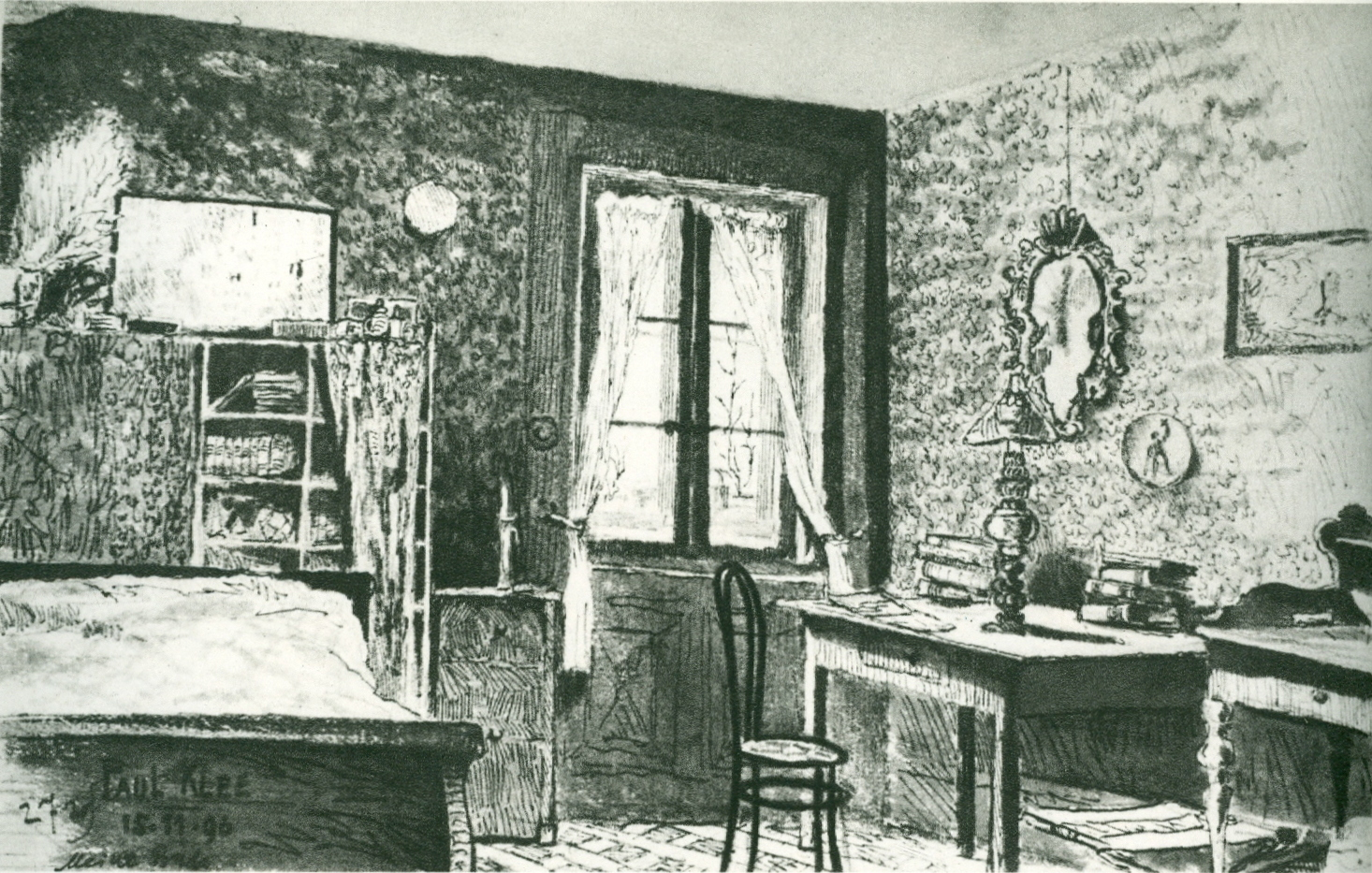
My Room (German: Meine Bude), 1896. Pen and ink wash, 120 by 190 mm (4 3/4 by 7 1/2 in). In the collection of the Klee Foundation, Bern, Switzerland

In his early years, following his parents' wishes, Klee focused on becoming a musician; but he decided on the visual arts during his teen years, partly out of rebellion and partly because modern music lacked meaning for him. He stated, "I didn't find the idea of going in for music creatively particularly attractive in view of the decline in the history of musical achievement." As a musician, he played and felt emotionally bound to traditional works of the eighteenth and nineteenth centuries, but as an artist he craved the freedom to explore radical ideas and styles. At sixteen, Klee's landscape drawings already show considerable skill.

Around 1897, Klee started his diary, which he kept until 1918, and which has provided scholars with valuable insight into his life and thinking. During his school years, he avidly drew in his school books, in particular drawing caricatures, and already demonstrating skill with line and volume. He barely passed his final exams at the Gymnasium of Bern, where he qualified in the Humanities. With his characteristic dry wit, he wrote, "After all, it's rather difficult to achieve the exact minimum, and it involves risks." On his own time, in addition to his deep interests in music and art, Klee was a great reader of literature, and later a writer on art theory and aesthetics.

With his parents' reluctant permission, in 1898 Klee began studying art at the Academy of Fine Arts in Munich with Heinrich Knirr and Franz von Stuck. He excelled at drawing but seemed to lack any natural color sense. He later recalled, "During the third winter I even realized that I probably would never learn to paint." During these times of youthful adventure, Klee spent much time in pubs and had affairs with lower-class women and artists' models. He had an illegitimate son in 1900 who died several weeks after birth.

After receiving his Fine Arts degree, Klee traveled in Italy from October 1901 to May 1902 with friend Hermann Haller. They visited Rome, Florence, Naples, and the Amalfi Coast, studying the master painters of past centuries. He exclaimed, "The Forum and the Vatican have spoken to me. Humanism wants to suffocate me." He responded to the colors of Italy, but sadly noted, "that a long struggle lies in store for me in this field of color." For Klee, color represented the optimism and nobility in art, and a hope for relief from the pessimistic nature he expressed in his black-and-white grotesques and satires. Returning to Bern, he lived with his parents for several years, and took occasional art classes. By 1905, he was developing some experimental techniques, including drawing with a needle on a blackened pane of glass, resulting in 57 works including his Portrait of My Father (1906). In the years 1903–05 he also completed a cycle of 11 zinc-plate etchings called Inventions, his first exhibited works, in which he illustrated several grotesque characters. He commented, "Though I'm fairly satisfied with my etchings I can't go on like this. I'm not a specialist." Klee was still dividing his time with music, playing the violin in an orchestra and writing concert and theater reviews.

== Marriage and early years ==
=== Marriage ===
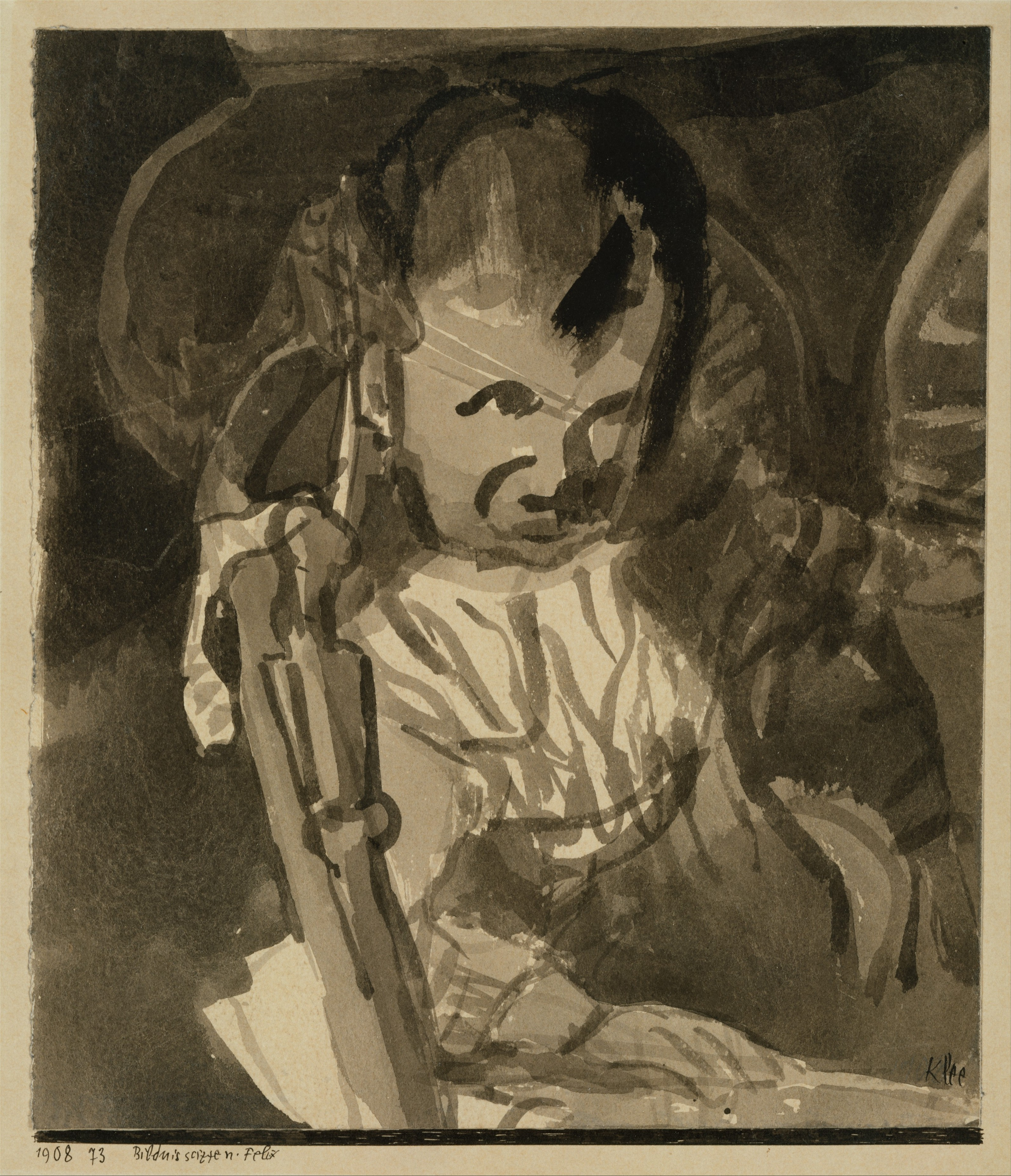
Sketch of Felix Klee as an infant, 1908, by Paul Klee. Ink wash on paper (The Berggruen Klee Collection)

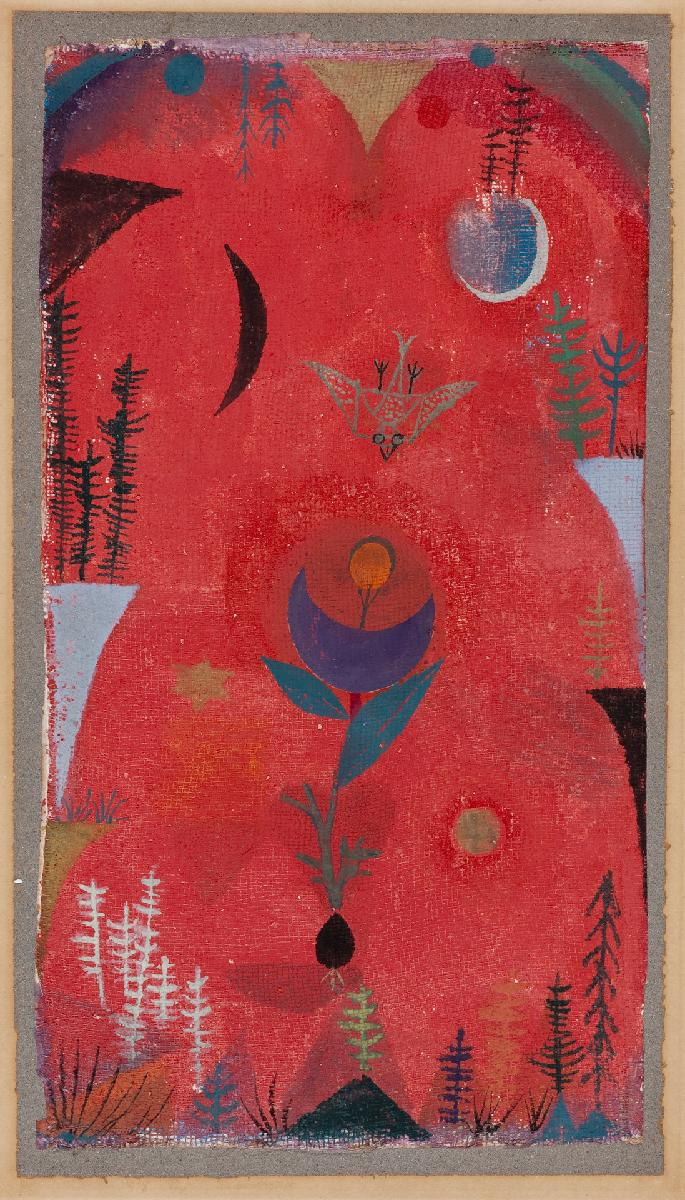
Flower Myth (Blumenmythos) 1918, watercolor on pastel foundation on fabric and newsprint mounted on board, Sprengel Museum, Hannover, Germany

Klee married Bavarian pianist Lily Stumpf in 1906 and they had a son named Felix Paul in the following year. They lived in a suburb of Munich, and while she gave piano lessons and occasional performances, he kept house and tended to his artwork. His attempt to be a magazine illustrator failed. Klee's art progressed slowly for the next five years, partly from having to divide his time with domestic matters, and partly as he tried to find a new approach. In 1910, he had his first solo exhibition in Bern, which then travelled to three Swiss cities.

=== Affiliation to the "Blaue Reiter", 1911 ===
In January 1911, Alfred Kubin met Klee in Munich and encouraged him to illustrate Voltaire's Candide. His resulting drawings were published in 1920 in a book edited by Kurt Wolff. Around this time, Klee's graphic work increased. His early inclination towards the absurd and the sarcastic was well received by Kubin, who befriended Klee and became one of his first significant collectors. Klee met, through Kubin, the art critic Wilhelm Hausenstein in 1911. Klee was a foundation member and manager of the Munich artists' union Sema that summer. That autumn he made the acquaintance of August Macke and Wassily Kandinsky, and in winter he joined the editorial team of the almanac Der Blaue Reiter, founded by Franz Marc and Kandinsky. On meeting Kandinsky, Klee recorded, "I came to feel a deep trust in him. He is somebody, and has an exceptionally beautiful and lucid mind." Other members included Macke, Gabriele Münter, and Marianne von Werefkin. Klee became, in a few months, one of the most important and independent members of the Blaue Reiter, but he was not yet fully integrated.

The release of the almanac was delayed by the first Blaue Reiter exhibition, which took place from 18 December 1911 to 1 January 1912 in the Moderne Galerie Heinrich Thannhauser in Munich. Klee did not attend, but showed 17 of his graphic works in the second exhibition (12 February to 18 March 1912) at the Galerie Goltz; the exhibit was titled Schwarz-Weiß, as it only addressed graphic painting. Initially planned to be released in 1911, the release date of the Der Blaue Reiter almanac by Kandinsky and Marc was delayed in May 1912, including the reproduced ink drawing Steinhauer by Klee. At the same time, Kandinsky published his art history writing Über das Geistige in der Kunst.

=== Participation in art exhibitions, 1912–1913 ===
The association opened Klee's mind to modern theories of color. His travels to Paris in 1912 also exposed him to the ferment of Cubism and the pioneering examples of "pure painting", an early term for abstract art. The use of bold color by Robert Delaunay and Maurice de Vlaminck also inspired him. Rather than copy these artists, Klee began working out his own color experiments in pale watercolors and did some primitive landscapes, including In the Quarry (1913) and Houses near the Gravel Pit (1913), using blocks of color with limited overlap. Klee acknowledged that "a long struggle lies in store for me in this field of color" in order to reach his "distant noble aim." Soon, he discovered "the style which connects drawing and the realm of color."

=== Trip to Tunis, 1914 ===
Klee's artistic breakthrough came in 1914 when he briefly visited Tunisia with August Macke and Louis Moilliet and was impressed by the quality of the light there. He wrote, "Color has taken possession of me; no longer do I have to chase after it, I know that it has hold of me forever... Color and I are one. I am a painter." With that realization, faithfulness to nature faded in importance. Instead, Klee began to delve into the "cool romanticism of abstraction". In gaining a second artistic vocabulary, Klee added color to his abilities in draftsmanship, and in many works combined them successfully, as he did in one series he called "operatic paintings". One of the most literal examples of this new synthesis is The Bavarian Don Giovanni (1919).

After returning home, Klee painted his first pure abstract, In the Style of Kairouan (1914), composed of colored rectangles and a few circles. The colored rectangle became his basic building block, what some scholars associate with a musical note, which Klee combined with other colored blocks to create a color harmony analogous to a musical composition. His selection of a particular color palette emulates a musical key. Sometimes he uses complementary pairs of colors, and other times "dissonant" colors, again reflecting his connection with musicality.

=== Military career ===
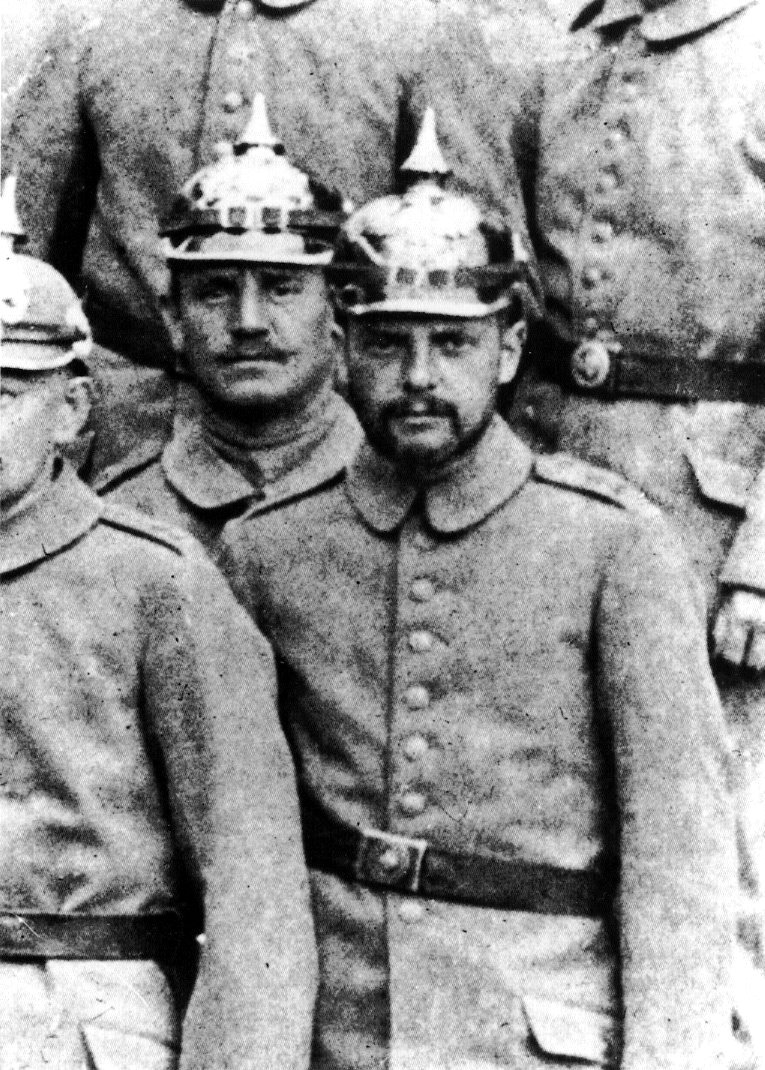
Paul Klee as a soldier, 1916

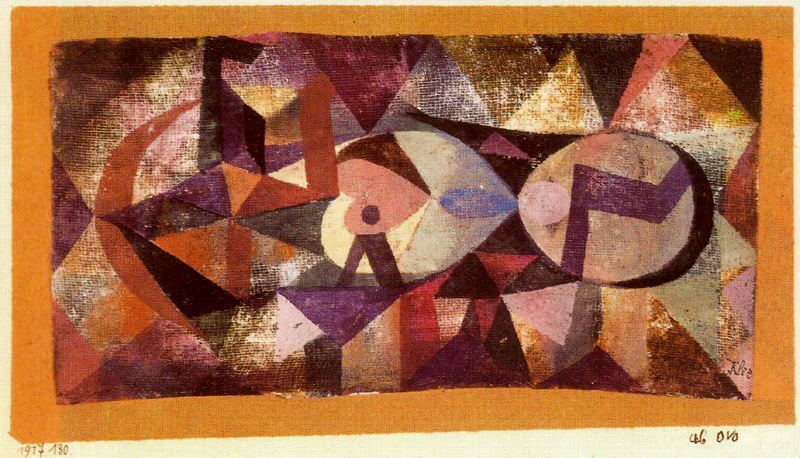
Ab ovo, Paul Klee

When World War I began a few weeks later, Klee seemed somewhat detached from the situation, He wrote, "I have long had this war in me. That is why, inwardly, it is none of my concern." Klee was conscripted as a Landsturmsoldat (soldier of the reserve forces) in the Imperial German Army on 5 March 1916. After finishing military recruit training, which began on 11 March 1916, he was sent to the Western Front.

The deaths of his friends August Macke and Franz Marc in battle began to affect him. Venting his distress, he created several pen and ink lithographs on war themes including Death for the Idea (1915).

Klee moved on 20 August 1916 to the aircraft maintenance company^{[b]} in Oberschleissheim, performing skilled manual work such as restoring aircraft camouflage and accompanying aircraft transports. On 17 January 1917, he was transferred to the Royal Bavarian flying school in Gersthofen (which 54 years later became the USASA Field Station Augsburg) to work as a clerk for the treasurer until the end of the war. This allowed him to stay in a small room outside of the barracks block and continue painting.

Klee continued to paint throughout the war and managed to exhibit his work in several shows. By 1917, his work was selling well and art critics acclaimed him as the best of the new German artists.

His Ab ovo (1917) is particularly noteworthy for its sophisticated technique. It employs watercolor on gauze and paper with a chalk ground, which produces a rich texture of triangular, circular, and crescent patterns. Demonstrating his range of exploration, mixing color and line, his Warning of the Ships (1918) is a colored drawing filled with symbolic images on a field of suppressed color.

== Mature career ==
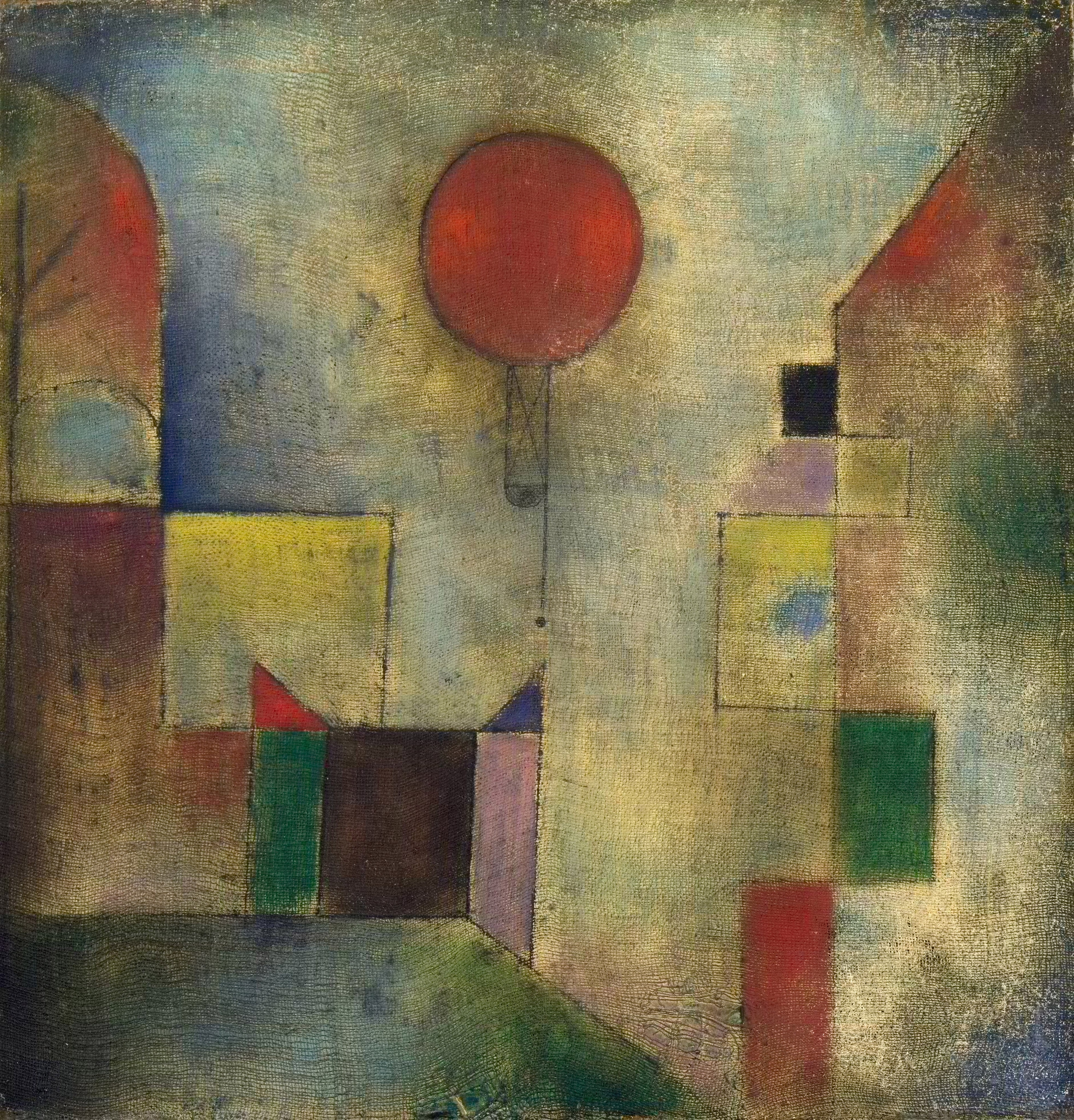
Red Balloon, 1922, oil on muslin primed with chalk, 31.8 × 31.1 cm. The Solomon R. Guggenheim Museum, New York

In 1919 Klee applied for a teaching post at the Academy of Art in Stuttgart, but the attempt failed. After that he managed to secure a three-year contract, with a minimum annual income, with dealer Hans Goltz, whose influential gallery gave Klee major exposure, and some commercial success. A retrospective of over 300 works, in 1920, was also notable.

Klee taught at the Bauhaus from January 1921 to April 1931. He was a "Form" master in the bookbinding, stained glass, and mural painting workshops and was provided with two studios. In 1922, Kandinsky joined the staff and resumed his friendship with Klee. Later that year the first Bauhaus exhibition and festival was held, for which Klee created several of the advertising materials. Klee welcomed the many conflicting theories and opinions within the Bauhaus: "I also approve of these forces competing one with the other if the result is achievement."

Klee was also a member of Die Blaue Vier (The Blue Four), with Kandinsky, Lyonel Feininger, and Alexej von Jawlensky, which formed in 1923, at the instigation of Galka Scheyer, who subsequently organized exhibitions of their work in the United States. In 1924, Klee had his first exhibits in Paris, and he became a hit with the French Surrealists. Klee visited Egypt in 1928, which impressed him less than Tunisia. In 1929, the first major monograph on Klee's work was published, written by Will Grohmann.

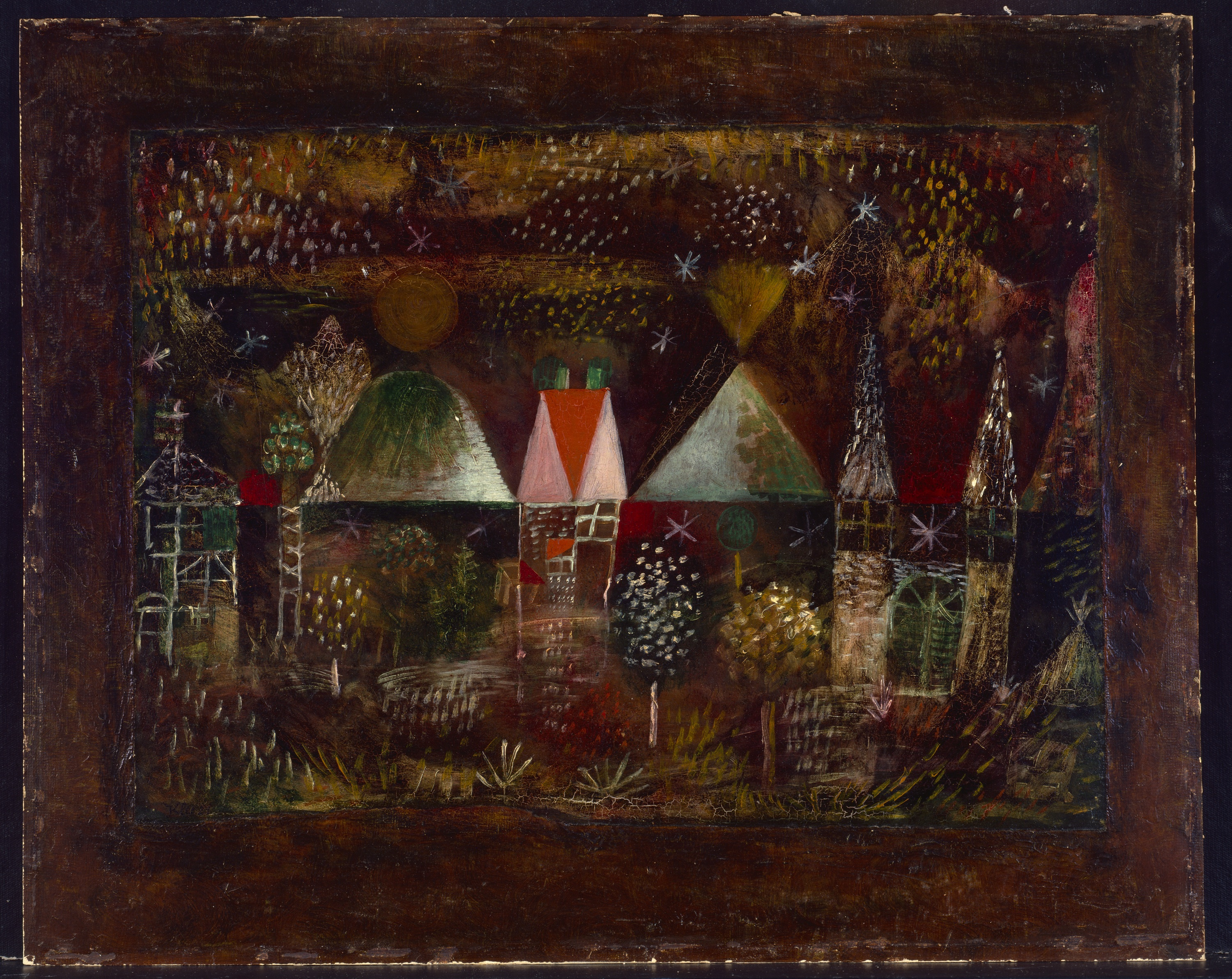
Nocturnal Festivity, 1921, The Solomon R. Guggenheim Museum, New York.

Klee also taught at the Düsseldorf Academy from 1931 to 1933, and was singled out by a Nazi newspaper, "Then that great fellow Klee comes onto the scene, already famed as a Bauhaus teacher in Dessau. He tells everyone he's a thoroughbred Arab, but he's a typical Galician Jew." His home was searched by the Gestapo and he was fired from his job. His self-portrait Struck from the List (1933) commemorates the sad occasion. In 1933–34, Klee had shows in London and Paris, and finally met Pablo Picasso, whom he greatly admired. The Klee family emigrated to Switzerland in late 1933.

Klee was at the peak of his creative output. His Ad Parnassum (1932) is considered his masterpiece and the best example of his pointillist style; it is also one of his largest, most finely worked paintings. He produced nearly 500 works in 1933 during his last year in Germany. However, in 1933, Klee began experiencing the symptoms of what was diagnosed as scleroderma after his death. The progression of his fatal disease, which made swallowing very difficult, can be followed through the art he created in his last years. His output in 1936 was only 25 pictures. In the later 1930s, his health recovered somewhat and he was encouraged by a visit from Kandinsky and Picasso. Klee's simpler and larger designs enabled him to keep up his output in his final years, and in 1939 he created over 1,200 works, a career high for one year. He used heavier lines and mainly geometric forms with fewer but larger blocks of color. His varied color palettes, some with bright colors and others somber, perhaps reflected his alternating moods of optimism and pessimism. Back in Germany in 1937, seventeen of Klee's pictures were included in an exhibition of "Degenerate art" and 102 of his works in public collections were seized by the Nazis.

== Death ==
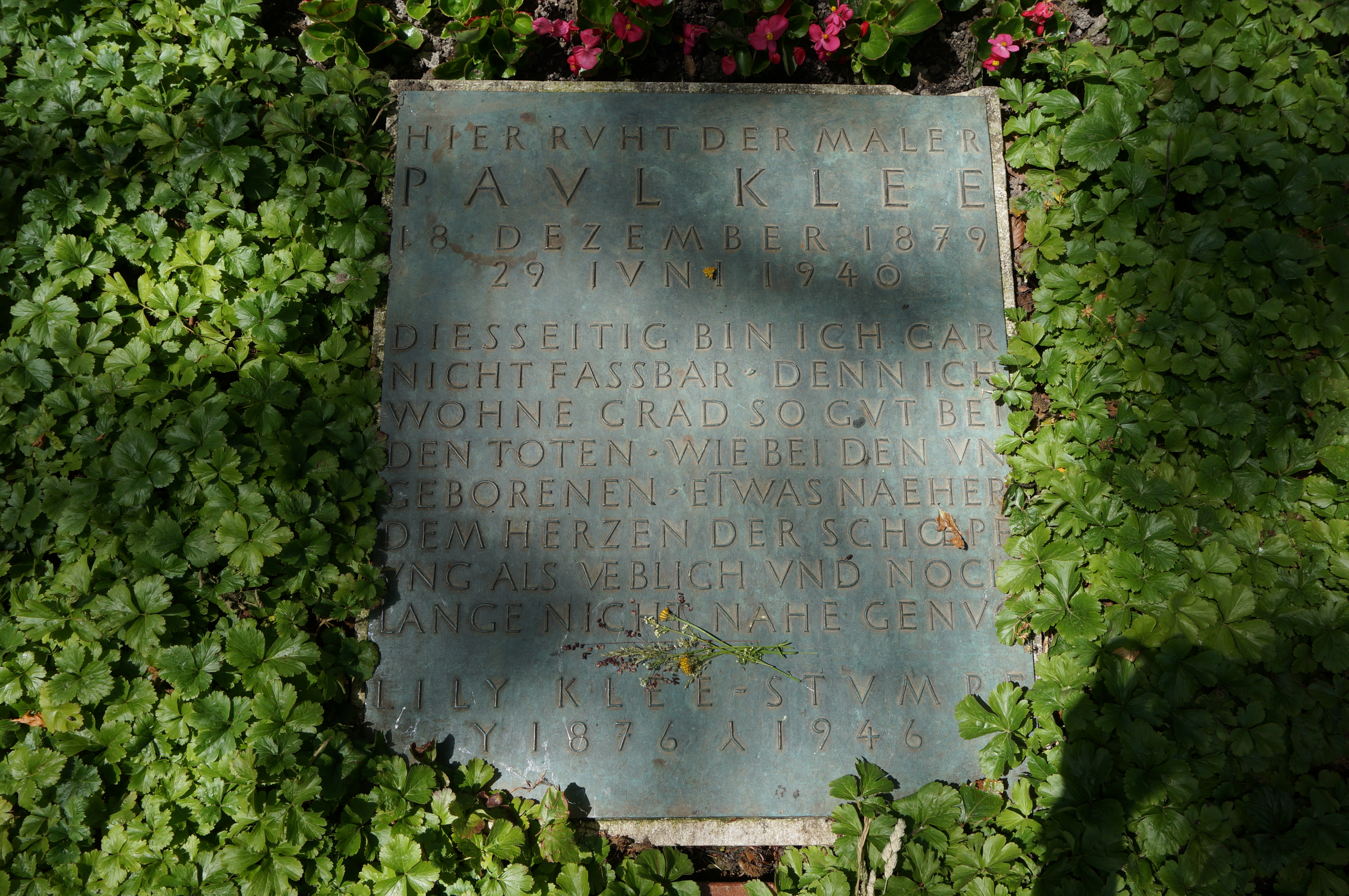
Klee's grave in Schosshalden cemetery

In 1935, two years after moving to Switzerland and working in a very confined situation, Klee developed scleroderma, an autoimmune disease resulting in hardening of connective tissue.

He endured pain that seems to be reflected in his last works of art. In his last months he created 50 drawings of angels. One of his last paintings, Death and Fire, features a skull in the center with the German word for death, "Tod", appearing in the face. He died in Muralto, Locarno, Switzerland, on 29 June 1940 without having obtained Swiss citizenship, despite his birth in that country. His art work was considered too revolutionary, even degenerate, by the Swiss authorities, but eventually they accepted his request six days after his death. His legacy comprised about 9,000 works of art. The words on his tombstone, Klee's credo, placed there by his son Felix, say, "I cannot be grasped in the here and now, for my dwelling place is as much among the dead as the yet unborn. Slightly closer to the heart of creation than usual, but still not close enough." He was buried at Schosshaldenfriedhof, Bern, Switzerland.

== Style and methods ==
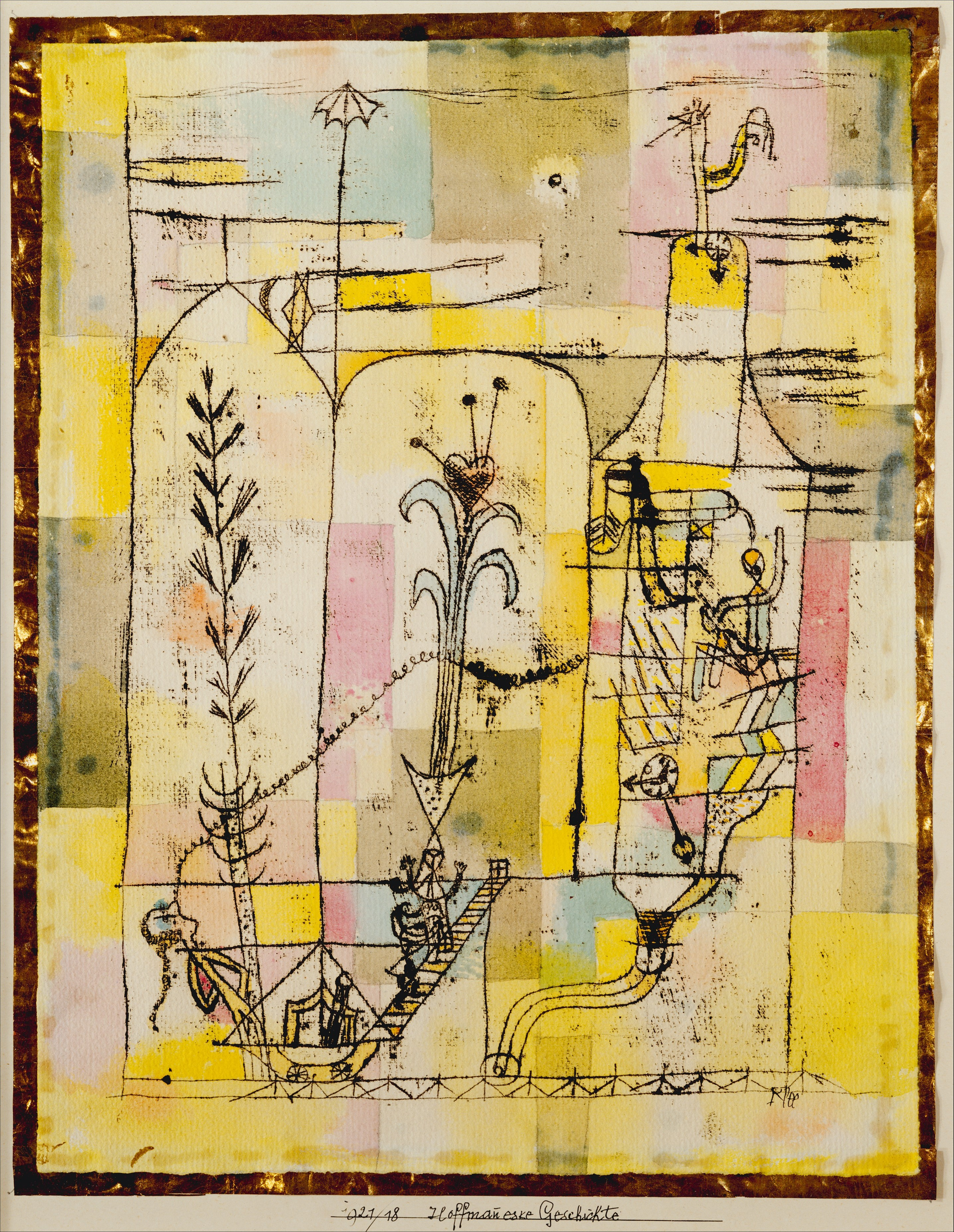
Tale à la Hoffmann (1921), watercolor, ink, and pencil on paper. 31.1 × 24.1 cm. In the collection of the Metropolitan Museum of Art, New York

Klee has been variously associated with Expressionism, Cubism, Futurism, Surrealism, and Abstraction, but his pictures are difficult to classify. He generally worked in isolation from his peers, and interpreted new art trends in his own way. He was inventive in his methods and technique. Klee worked in many different media—oil paint, watercolor, ink, pastel, etching, and others. He often combined them into one work. He used canvas, burlap, muslin, linen, gauze, cardboard, metal foils, fabric, wallpaper, and newsprint. Klee employed spray paint, knife application, stamping, glazing, and impasto, and mixed media such as oil with watercolor, watercolor with pen and India ink, and oil with tempera.

He was a natural draftsman, and through long experimentation developed a mastery of color and tonality. Many of his works combine these skills. He uses a great variety of color palettes from nearly monochromatic to highly polychromatic. His works often have a fragile childlike quality to them and are usually on a small scale. He often used geometric forms and grid format compositions as well as letters and numbers, frequently combined with playful figures of animals and people. Some works were completely abstract. Many of his works and their titles reflect his dry humor and varying moods; some express political convictions. They frequently allude to poetry, music and dreams and sometimes include words or musical notation. The later works are distinguished by spidery hieroglyph-like symbols. Rainer Maria Rilke wrote about Klee in 1921, "Even if you hadn't told me he plays the violin, I would have guessed that on many occasions his drawings were transcriptions of music."

Pamela Kort observed: "Klee's 1933 drawings present their beholder with an unparalleled opportunity to glimpse a central aspect of his aesthetics that has remained largely unappreciated: his lifelong concern with the possibilities of parody and wit. Herein lies their real significance, particularly for an audience unaware that Klee's art has political dimensions."

Among the few plastic works are hand puppets made between 1916 and 1925, for his son Felix. The artist neither counted them as a component of his oeuvre, nor did he list them in his catalogue raisonné. Thirty of the preserved puppets are stored at the Zentrum Paul Klee, Bern.

== Poetry ==
Although Klee never published any poetry in his lifetime, he continued to write and rewrite rough drafts in his diary, and in a blue notebook that he titled deprecatingly Geduchte (Pomes). After his death, selections were published in German in 1960 and then in English translation by Anselm Hollo (1962) and by Harriett Watts (1974). Later still there was a study by K. Porter Aichele (2006) that examined the way the two arts cross-fertilized in his work. This was foreshadowed by the observations of Klee's translators that "a mastery of 'line', a love for the modes of dance and play, combine in Klee – both poet and painter," and that "His poems, like many of his paintings, must succeed as miniatures".

Klee's intuitional approach to his paintings and drawings is annotated in his poetry in such short sections of longer works as "Has inspiration/ eyes, or does she/ walk in her sleep?" and "The practised hand/ often knows it better than the head". Aichele also observes that Klee "continued to incorporate selected poems into drawings and paintings" throughout his career. Among his instances is "Once emerged from the grey of night" (Einst dem Grau der Nacht enttaucht, 1918) as an example of "pictorial writing" (Bilderschrift). Here the title is taken from the first line of a poetic composition at the head of the picture, while a cut-up of individual letters in coloured squares succeeds it.

Another example given by Aichele is "Tree nursery" (1929), with its banded lines of incised primitive script, where "the meaning resides in the structural rhythms set in motion by the viewer, who attempts to reconcile these two fundamentally different approaches to interpretation". Over the following decade Klee concentrated increasingly on depicting these poetic signs expressive of the narrative of which they are part. According to Aichele, these are encompassed by the intellectual movements of the time that eventually resulted in Concrete Poetry and, as an extension of this, Visual Poetry.

== Graphic works ==
=== Early works ===
Some of Klee's early preserved children's drawings, which his grandmother encouraged, were listed on his catalogue raisonné. A total of 19 etchings were produced during the Bern years; ten of these were made between 1903 and 1905 in the cycle "Inventionen" (Inventions), which were presented in June 1906 at the "Internationale Kunstausstellung des Vereins bildender Künstler Münchens 'Secession'" (International Art Exhibition of the Association for Graphic Arts, Munich, Secession), his first appearance as a painter in the public. Klee had removed the third Invention, Pessimistische Allegorie des Gebirges (Pessimistic Allegory of the Mountain), in February 1906 from his cycle. The satirical etchings, for example Jungfrau im Baum/Jungfrau (träumend) (Virgin on the tree/Virgin (dreaming)) from 1903 and Greiser Phoenix (Aged Phoenix) from 1905, were classified by Klee as "surrealistic outposts". Jungfrau im Baum ties on the motive Le cattive madri (1894) by Giovanni Segantini. The picture was influenced by grotesque lyric poetries of Alfred Jarry, Max Jacob and Christian Morgenstern. It features a cultural pessimism, which can be found at the turn of the 20th century in works by Symbolists. The Invention Nr. 6, the 1903 etching Zwei Männer, einander in höherer Stellung vermutend (Two Men, Supposing the Other to be in a Higher Position), depicts two naked men, presumably emperor Wilhelm II and Franz Joseph I of Austria, recognizable by their hairstyle and beards. As their clothes and insignia were bereft, "both of them have no clue if their conventional salute […] is in order or not. As they assume that their counterpart could have been higher rated", they bow and scrape.

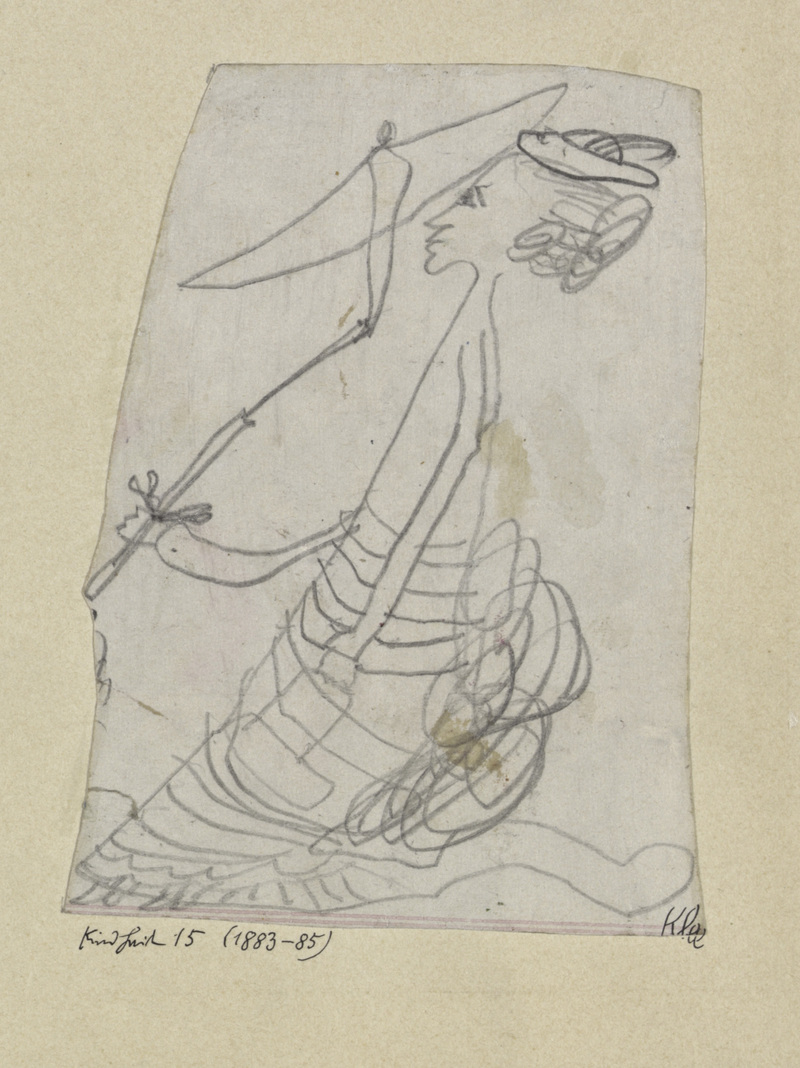
Dame mit Sonnenschirm, 1883–1885, pencil on paper on cardboard, Zentrum Paul Klee, Bern

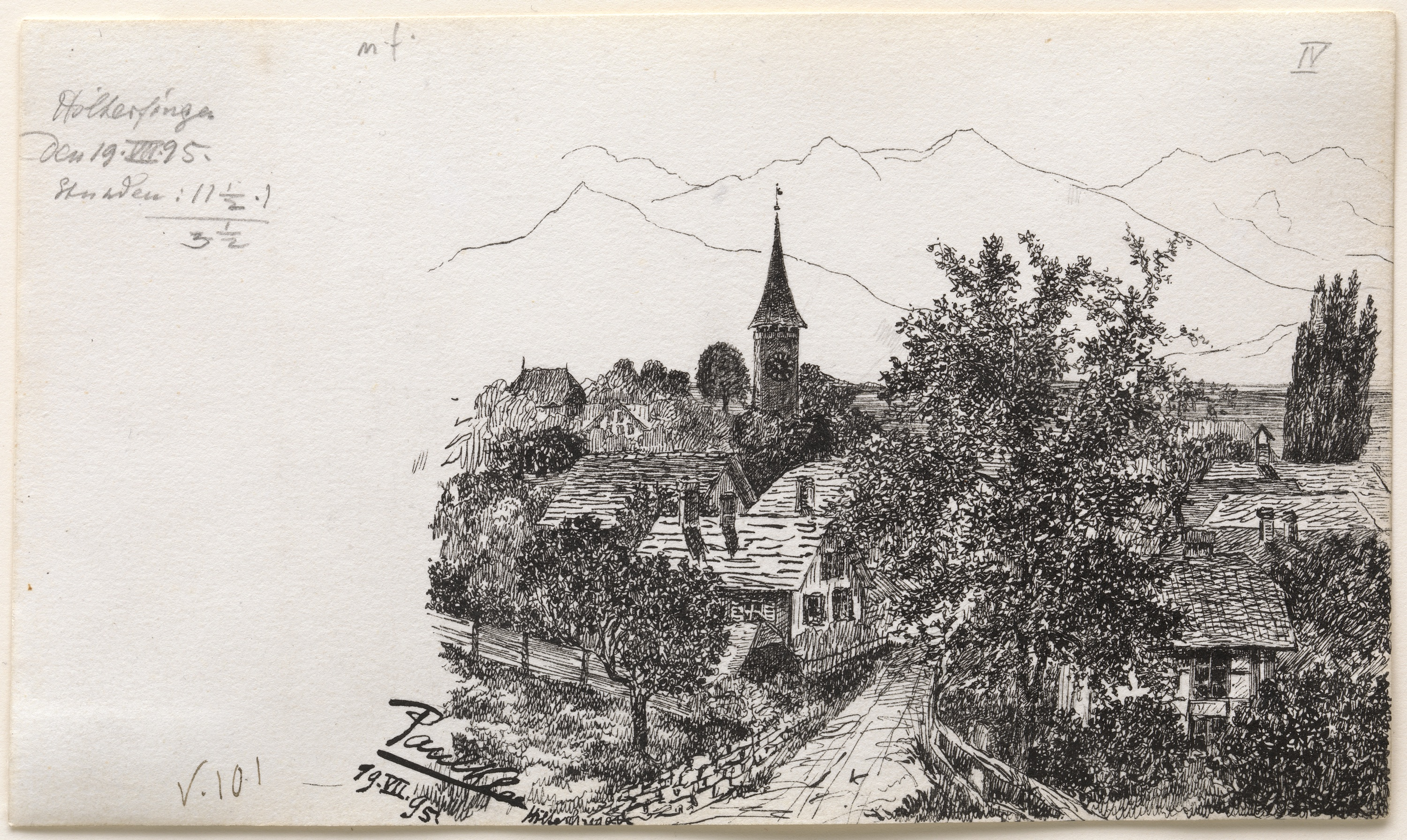
Hilterfingen, 1895, ink on paper, Solomon R. Guggenheim Museum, New York

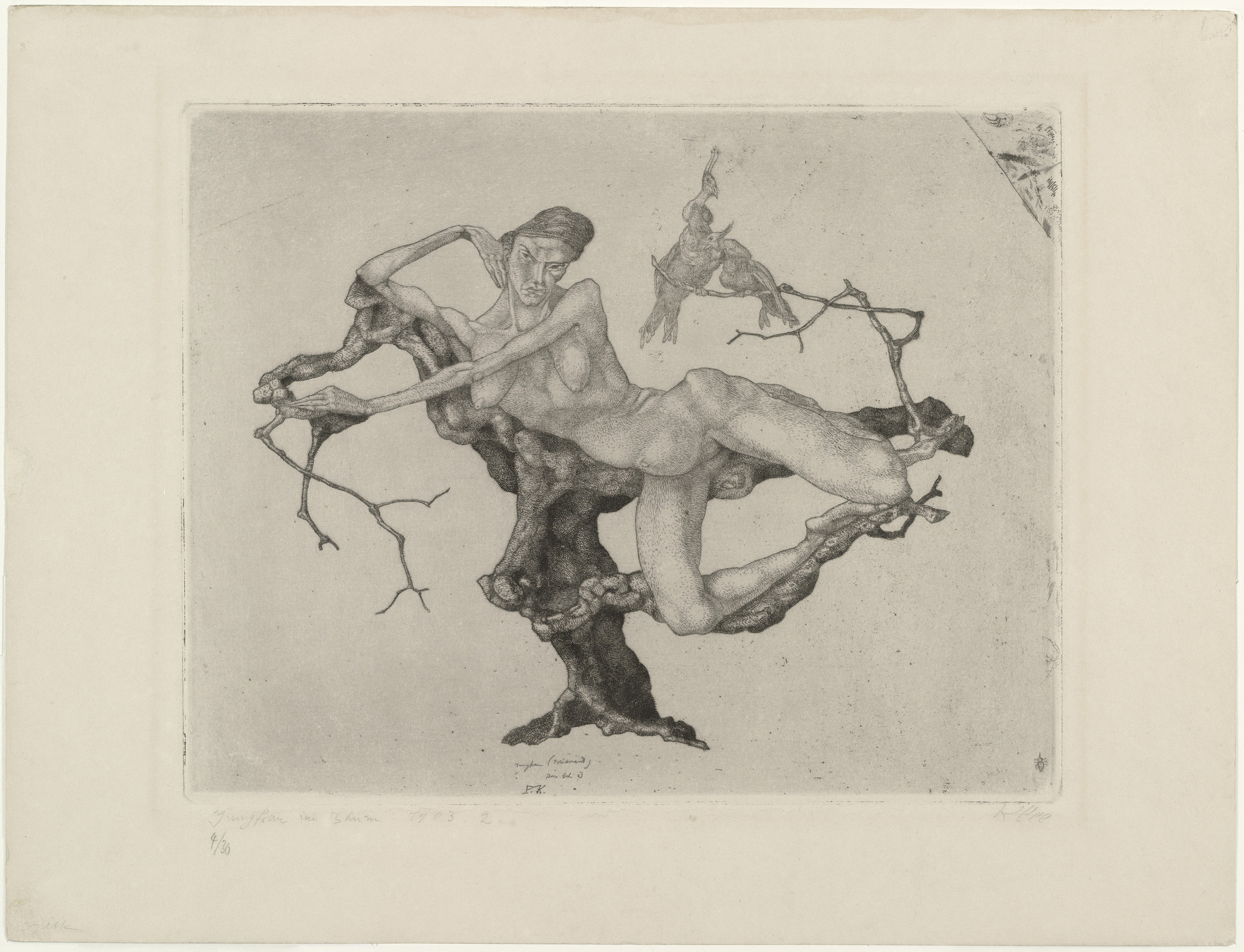
Third Invention: Jungfrau im Baum, 1903, etching, Museum of Modern Art, New York

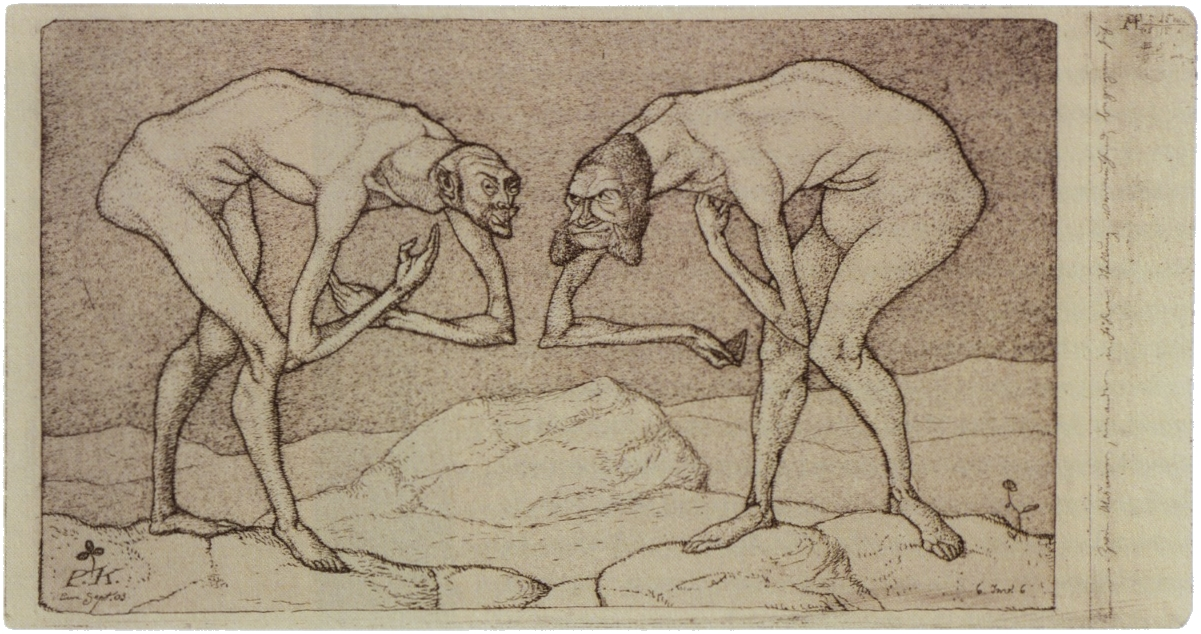
Sixth Invention: Zwei Männer, einander in höherer Stellung vermutend, begegnen sich, 1903, etching, Zentrum Paul Klee, Bern

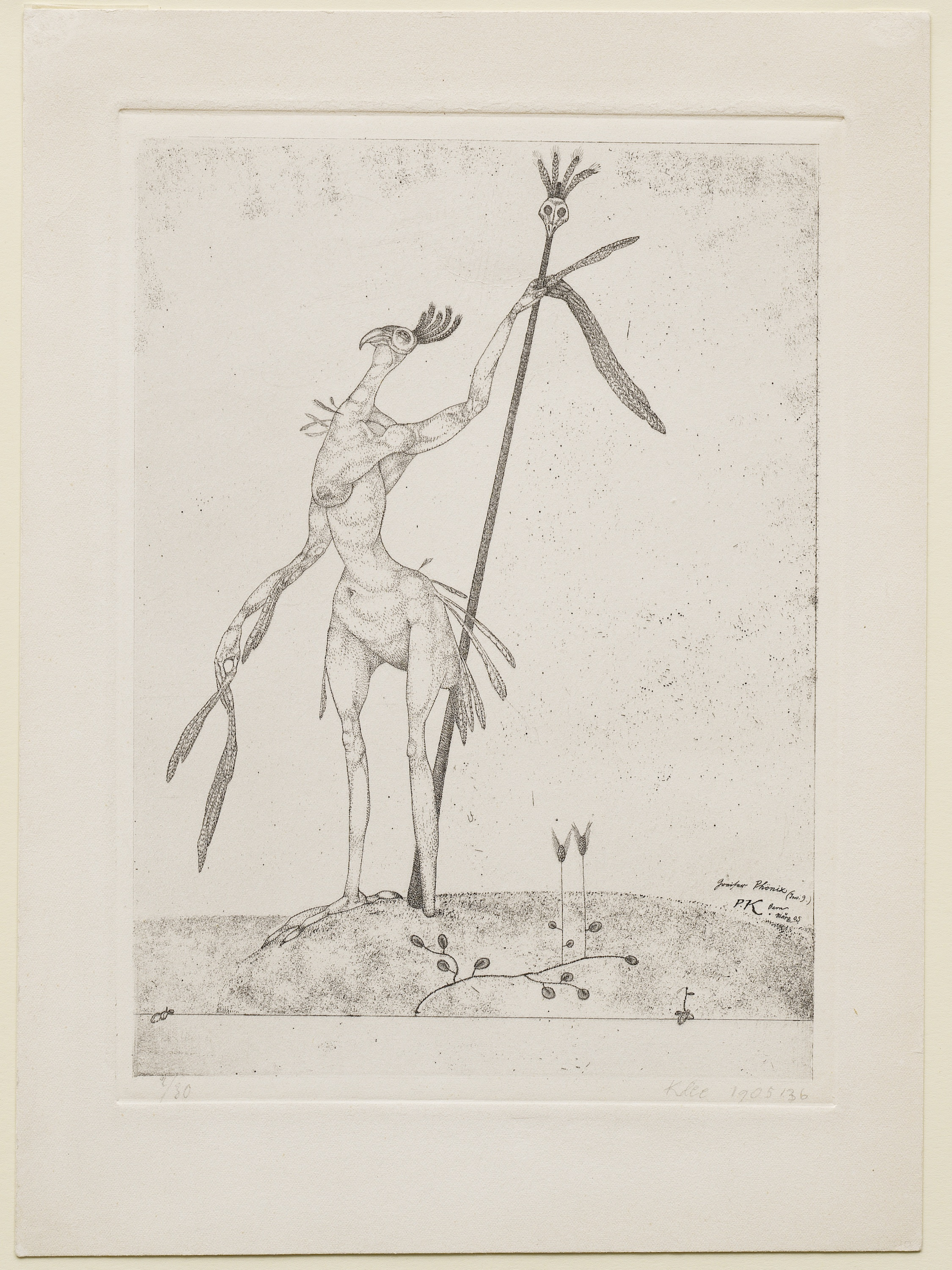
Aged Phoenix, 1905, etching, Solomon R. Guggenheim Museum, New York

Klee began to introduce a new technique in 1905: scratching on a blackened glass panel with a needle. In that manner he created about 57 Verre églomisé pictures, among those the 1905 Gartenszene (Scene in a Garden) and the 1906 Porträt des Vaters (Portrait of a Father), with which he tried to combine painting and scratching. Klee's solitary early work ended in 1911, the year he met and was inspired by the graphic artist Alfred Kubin, and became associated with the artists of the Blaue Reiter.

=== Mystical-abstract period, 1914–1919 ===
During his twelve-day educational trip to Tunis in April 1914 Klee produced with Macke and Moilliet watercolor paintings, which implement the strong light and color stimulus of the North African countryside in the fashion of Paul Cézanne and Robert Delaunay's cubistic form concepts. The aim was not to imitate nature, but to create compositions analogous to nature's formative principle, as in the works In den Häusern von Saint-Germain (In the Houses of Saint-Germain) and Straßencafé (Street Café). Klee conveyed the scenery in a grid, so that it dissolves into colored harmony. He also created abstract works in that period such as Abstract and Farbige Kreise durch Farbbänder verbunden (Colored Circles Tied Through Inked Ribbons). He never abandoned the object; a permanent segregation never took place. It took over ten years that Klee worked on experiments and analysis of the color, resulting in an independent artificial work, whereby his design ideas were based on the colorful oriental world.

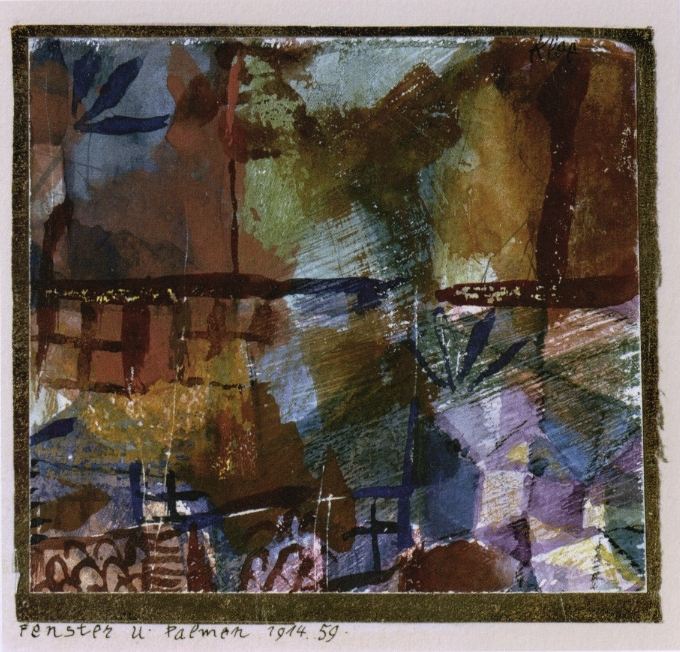
Fenster und Palmen, 1914, watercolor on grounding on paper on cardboard, Kunsthaus Zürich, Zurich

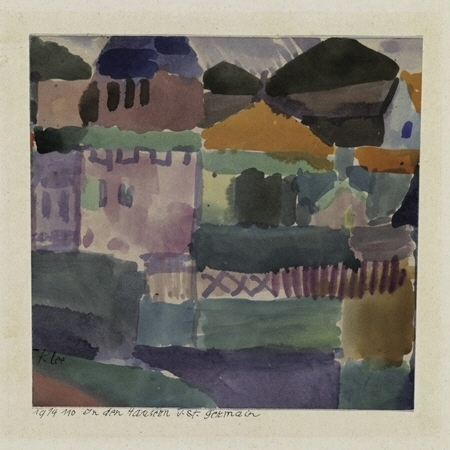
In den Häusern von St. Germain, 1914, watercolor on paper on cardboard, Zentrum Paul Klee, Bern

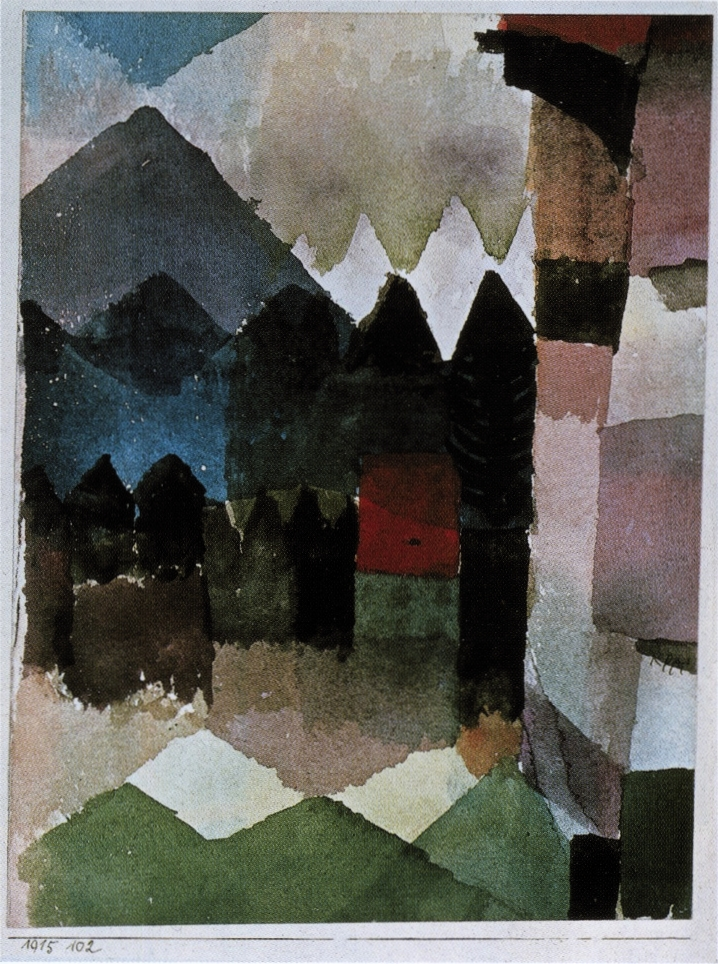
Föhn im Marc’schen Garten, 1915, watercolor on paper on cardboard, Lenbachhaus, Munich

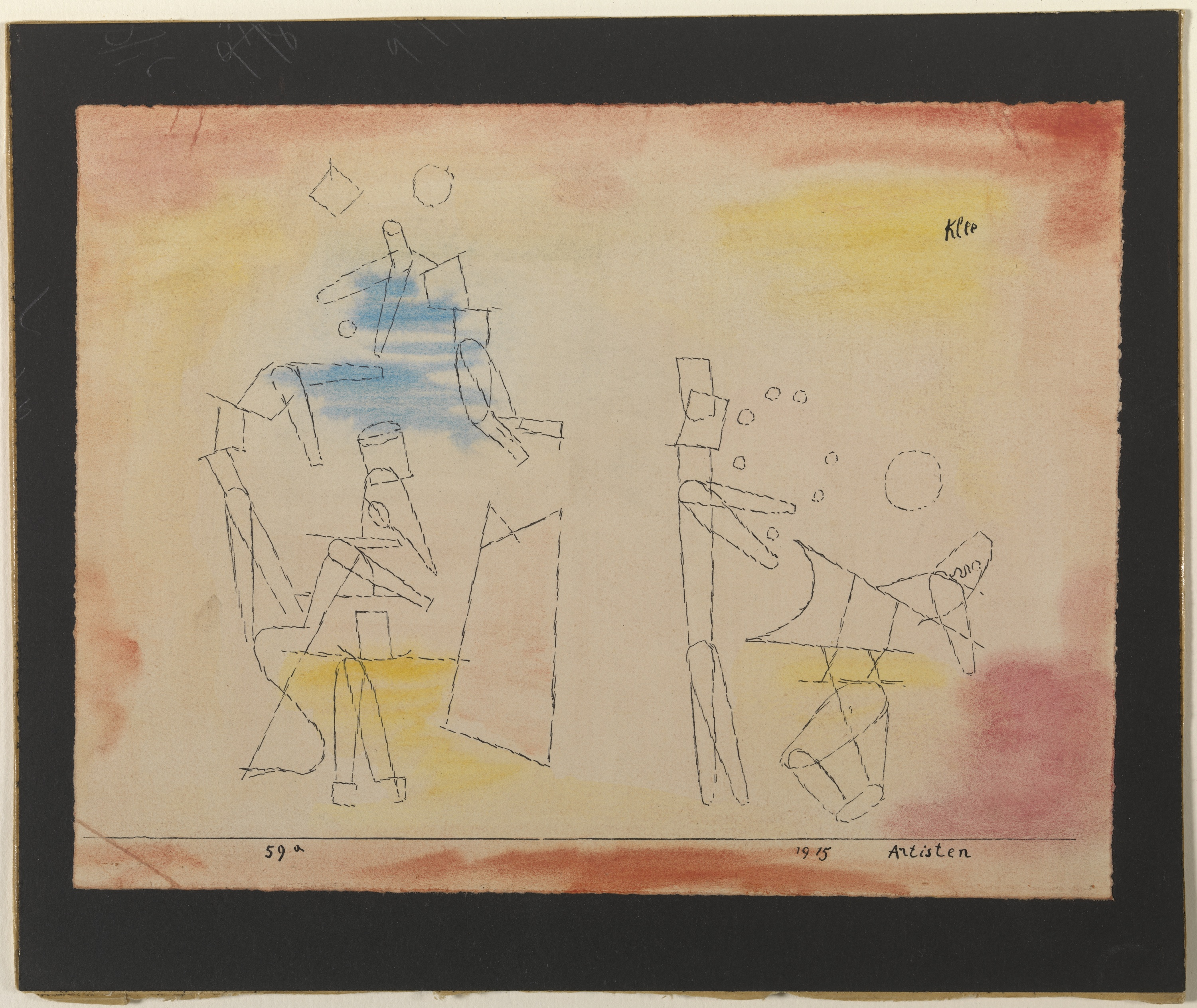
Acrobats, 1915, watercolor, pastel and ink on paper, Solomon R. Guggenheim Museum, New York

Föhn im Marc'schen Garten (Foehn in Marc's Garden) was made after the Turin trip. It indicates the relations between color and the stimulus of Macke and Delaunay. Although elements of the garden are clearly visible, a further steering towards abstraction is noticeable. In his diary Klee wrote the following note at that time:

In the large molding pit are lying ruins, on which one partially hangs. They provide the material for the abstraction. […] The terrible the world, the abstract the art, while a happy world produces secularistic art.

Under the impression of his military service he created the painting Trauerblumen (Velvetbells) in 1917, which, with its graphical signs, vegetal and phantastic shapes, is a forerunner of his future works, harmonically combining graphic, color and object. For the first time birds appear in the pictures, such as in Blumenmythos (Flower Myth) from 1918, mirroring the flying and falling planes he saw in Gersthofen, and the photographed plane crashes.

In the 1918 watercolor painting already mentioned above, Einst dem Grau der Nacht enttaucht, he incorporated letters in small - in terms of color - separated squares, cutting off the first verse from the second one with silver paper. At the top of the cardboard, which carries the picture, the verses are inscribed in manuscript form. Here, Klee did not lean on Delaunay's colors, but on Marc's, although the picture content of both painters does not correspond with each other. Herwarth Walden, Klee's art dealer, saw in them a "Wachablösung" (changing of the guard) of his art. Since 1919 he often used oil colors, with which he combined watercolors and colored pencil. The Villa R (Kunstmuseum Basel) from 1919 unites visible realities such as sun, moon, mountains, trees and architectures, as well as surreal pledges and sentiment readings.

=== Works in the Bauhaus period and in Düsseldorf ===
His works during this time include Camel (in rhythmic landscape with trees) as well as other paintings with abstract graphical elements such as betroffener Ort (Affected Place) (1922). From that period he created Die Zwitscher-Maschine (The Twittering Machine), which was later removed from the National Gallery. After being named defamatory in the Munich exhibition "Entartete Kunst", the painting was later bought by the Buchholz Gallery, New York, and then transferred in 1939 to the Museum of Modern Art. The "twittering" in the title refers to the open-beaked birds, while the "machine" is illustrated by the crank.

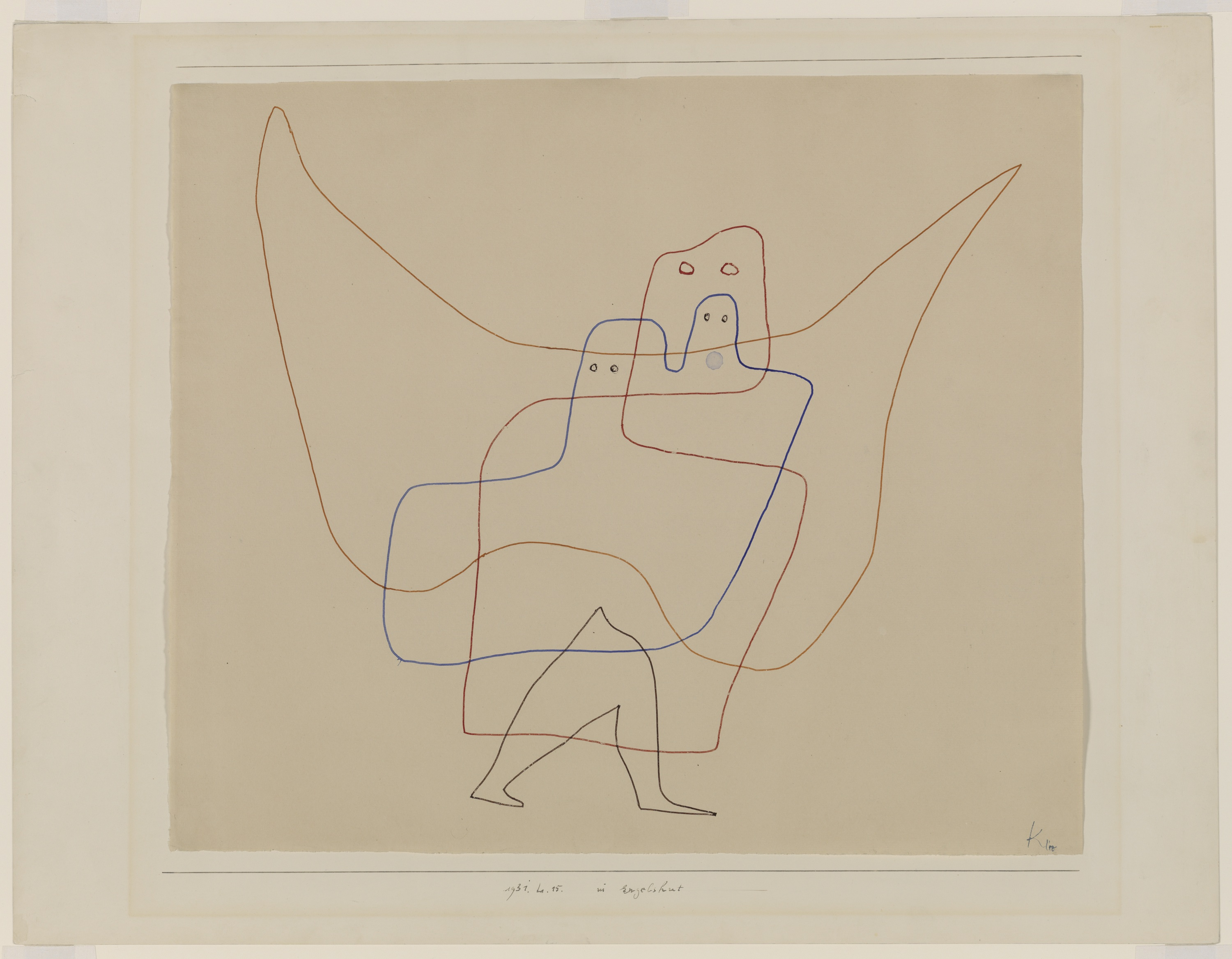
In Engelshut, 1931, watercolor and colored inks on paper, mounted on paper, Solomon R. Guggenheim Museum

The watercolor painting appears at a first glance childish, but it allows more interpretations. The picture can be interpreted as a critique by Klee, who shows through denaturation of the birds, that the world technization heist the creatures' self-determination.

Other examples from that period are der Goldfisch (The Goldfish) from 1925, Katze und Vogel (Cat and Bird), from 1928, and Hauptweg und Nebenwege (Main Road and Byways) from 1929. Through variations of the canvas ground and his combined painting techniques Klee created new color effects and picture impressions.

From 1916 to 1925, Klee created 50 hand puppets for his son Felix. The puppets are not mentioned in the Bauhaus catalog of works, since they were intended as private toys from the beginning. Nevertheless, they are an impressive example of Klee's imagery. He not only dealt with puppet shows privately, but also in his artistic work at the Bauhaus.

In 1931, Klee transferred to Düsseldorf to teach at the Akademie; the Nazis shut down the Bauhaus soon after. During this time, Klee illustrated a series of guardian angels. Among these figurations is "In Engelshut" (In the Angel's Care). Its overlaying technique evinces the polyphonic character of his drawing method between 1920 and 1932.

The 1932 painting Ad Parnassum was also created in the Düsseldorf period. 100 cm × 126 cm (39 in × 50 in) This is one of his largest paintings, as he usually worked with small formats. In this mosaic-like work in the style of pointillism he combined different techniques and compositional principles. Influenced by his trip to Egypt from 1928 to 1929, Klee built a color field from individually stamped dots, surrounded by similarly stamped lines, which results in a pyramid. Above the roof of the "Parnassus" there is a sun. The title identifies the picture as the home of Apollo and the Muses. During his 1929 travels through Egypt, Klee developed a sense of connection to the land, described by art historian Olivier Berggruen as a mystical feeling: "In the desert, the sun's intense rays seemed to envelop all living things, and at night, the movement of the stars felt even more palpable. In the architecture of the ancient funerary moments Klee discovered a sense of proportion and measure in which human beings appeared to establish a convincing relationship with the immensity of the landscape; furthermore, he was drawn to the esoteric numerology that governed the way in which these monuments had been built." In 1933, his last year in Germany, he created a range of paintings and drawings; the catalogue raisonné comprised 482 works. The self-portrait in the same year—with the programmatic title von der Liste gestrichen (removed from the list)—provides information about his feeling after losing his professorship. The abstract portrait was painted in dark colors and shows closed eyes and compressed lips, while on the back of his head there is a large "X", symbolizing that his art was no longer valued in Germany.

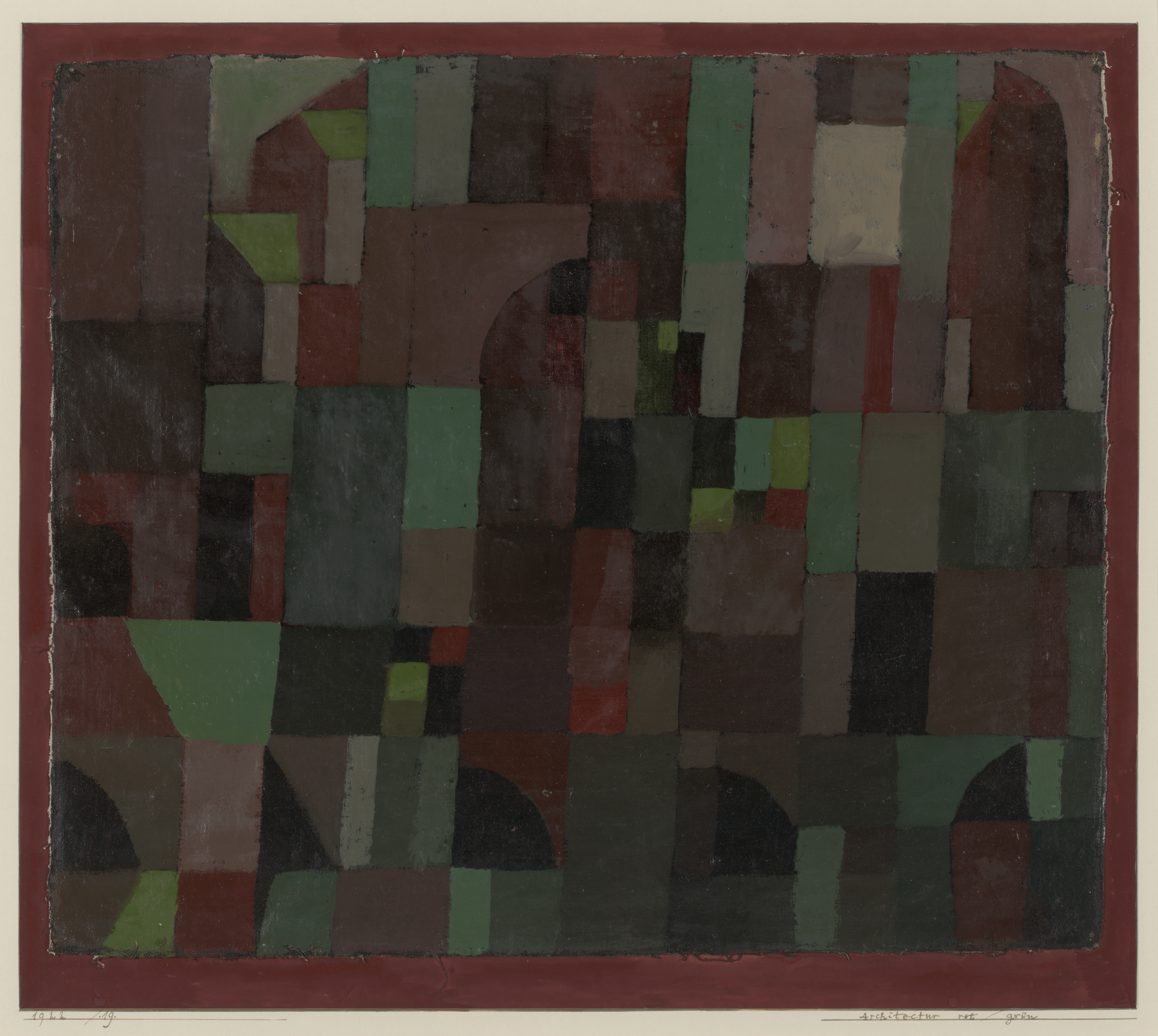
Red/Green Architecture (yellow/violet gradation), 1922, oil on canvas on cardboard mat, Yale University Art Gallery, Yale University, New Haven, Connecticut

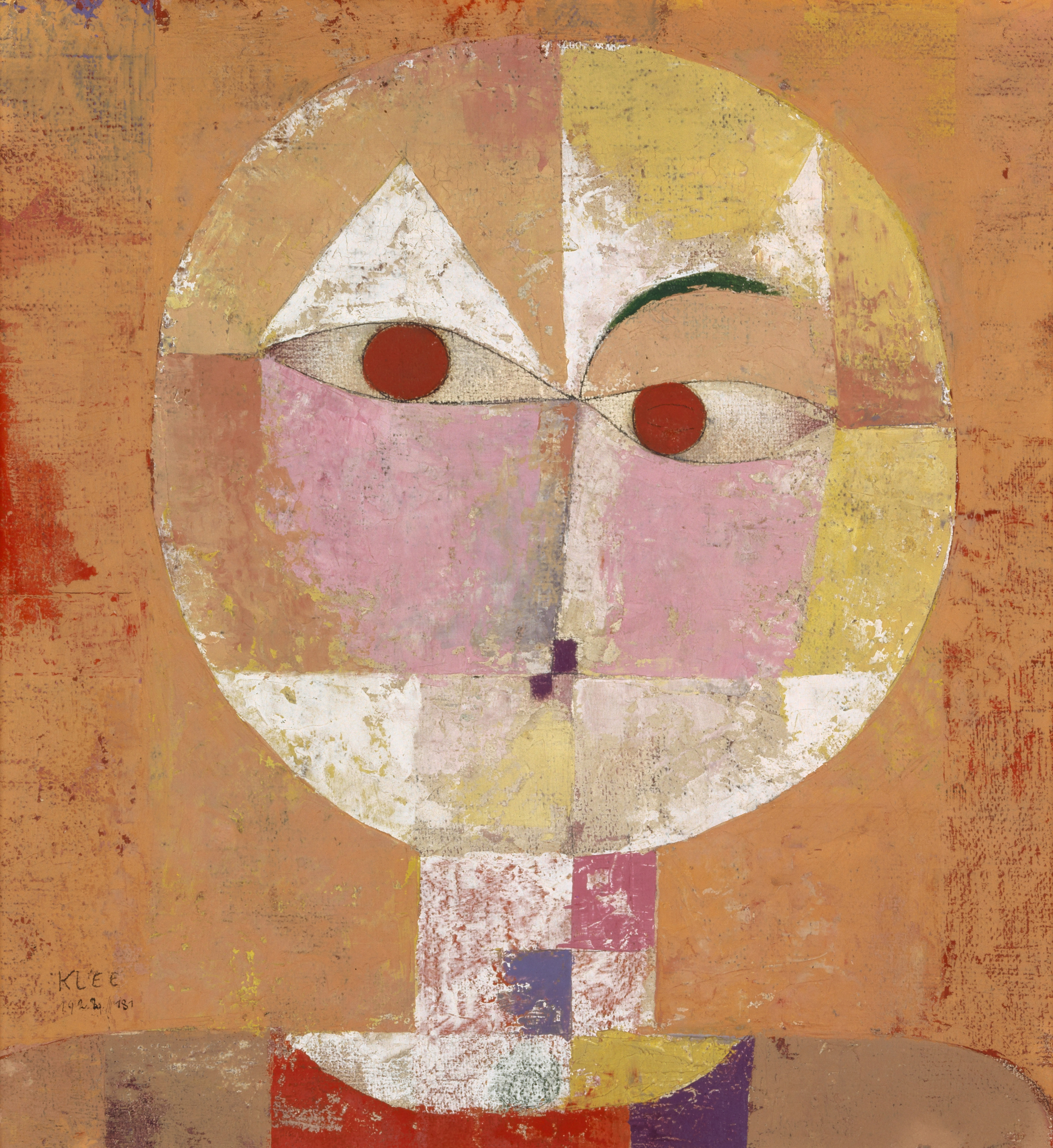
Senecio, 1922, oil on gauze, Kunstmuseum Basel, Basel

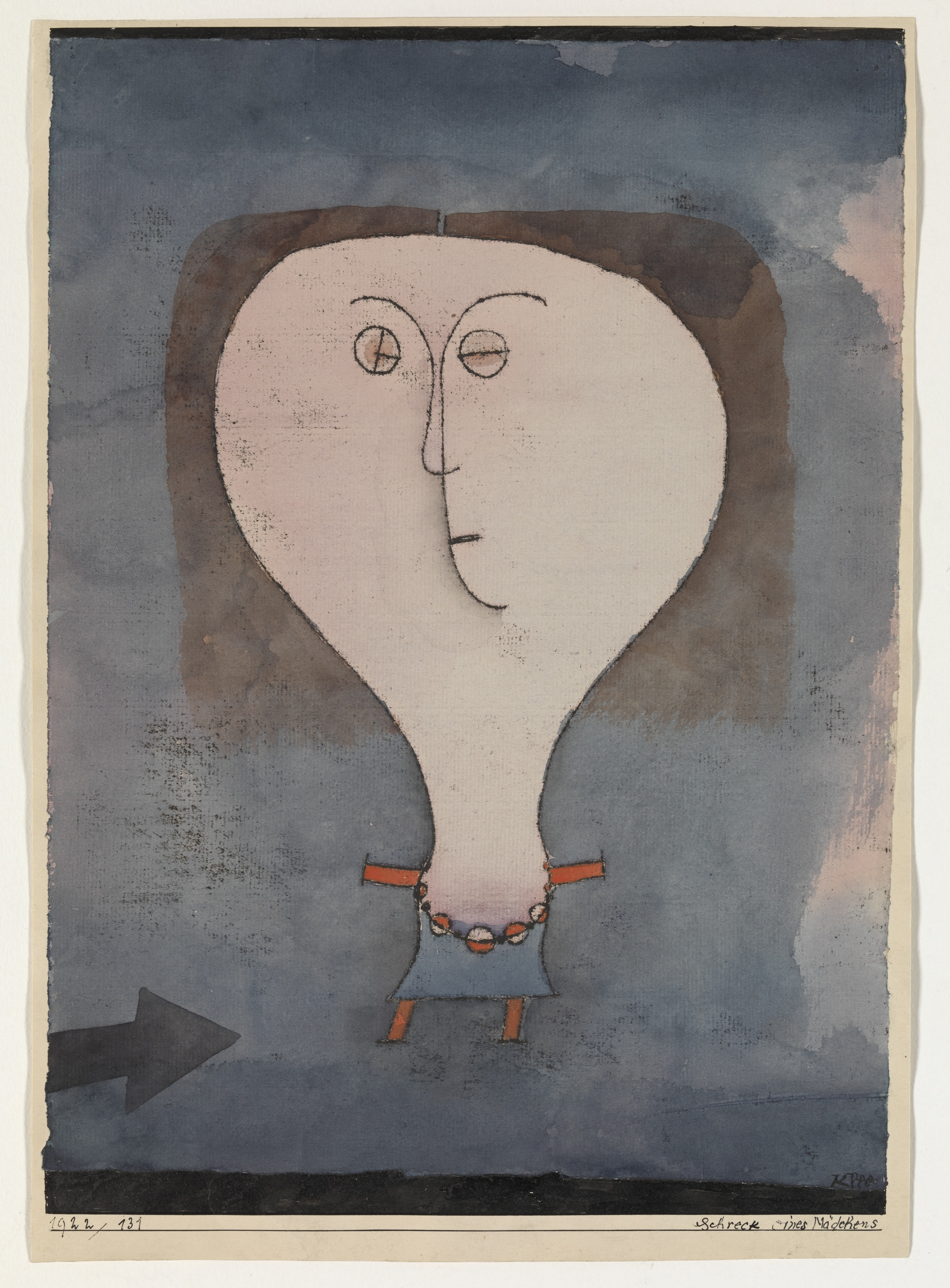
Fright of a Girl, 1922, Watercolor, India ink and oil transfer drawing on paper, with India ink on paper mount, Solomon R. Guggenheim Museum, New York

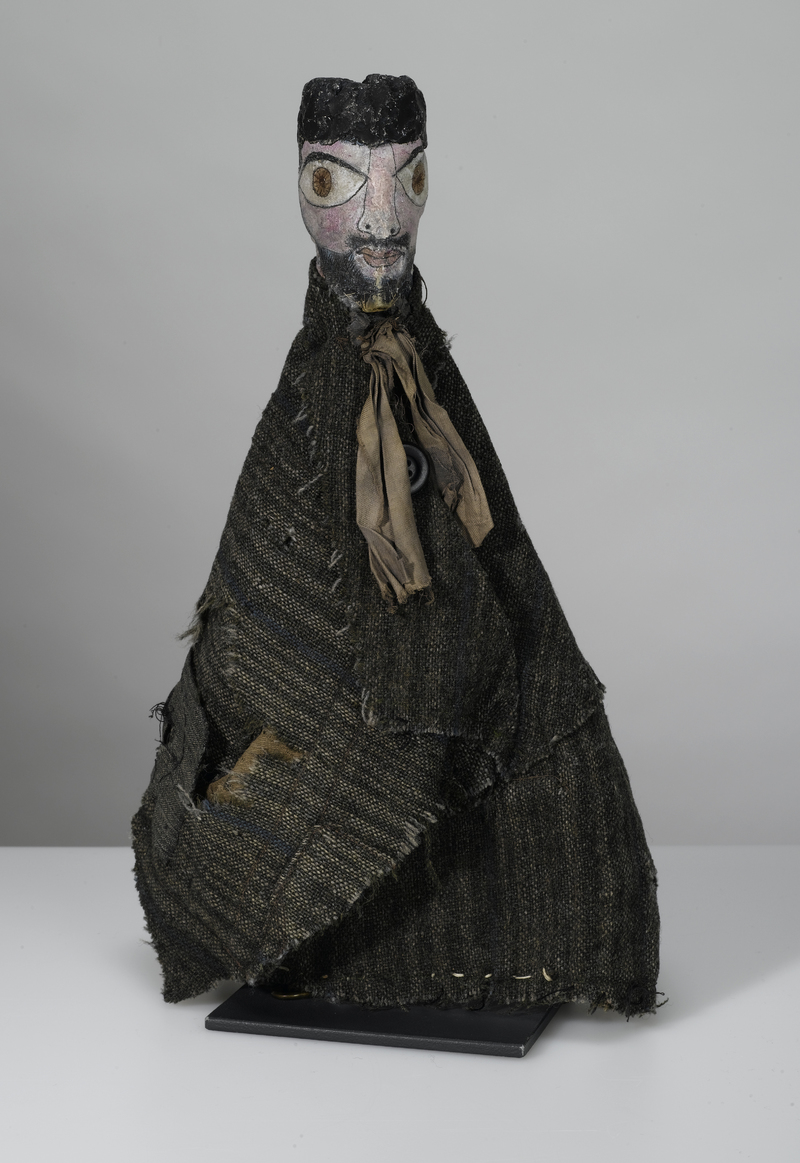
Puppet without title (self-portrait), 1922, Zentrum Paul Klee, Bern

=== Last works in Switzerland ===
In this period Klee mainly worked on large-sized pictures. After the onset of illness, there were about 25 works in the 1936 catalogue, but his productivity increased in 1937 to 264 pictures, 1938 to 489, and 1939—his most productive year—to 1254. They dealt with ambivalent themes, expressing his personal fate, the political situation and his wit. Examples are the watercolor painting Musiker (musician), a stick-man face with partially serious, partially smiling mouth; and the Revolution des Viadukts (Revolution of the Viadukt), an anti-fascist art. In Viadukt (1937) the bridge arches split from the bank as they refuse to be linked to a chain and are therefore rioting. Since 1938, Klee worked more intensively with hieroglyphic-like elements. The painting Insula dulcamara from the same year, which is one of his largest (88 cm × 176 cm (35 in × 69 in)), shows a white face in the middle of the elements, symbolizing death with its black-circled eye sockets. Bitterness and sorrow are not rare in much of his works during this time.

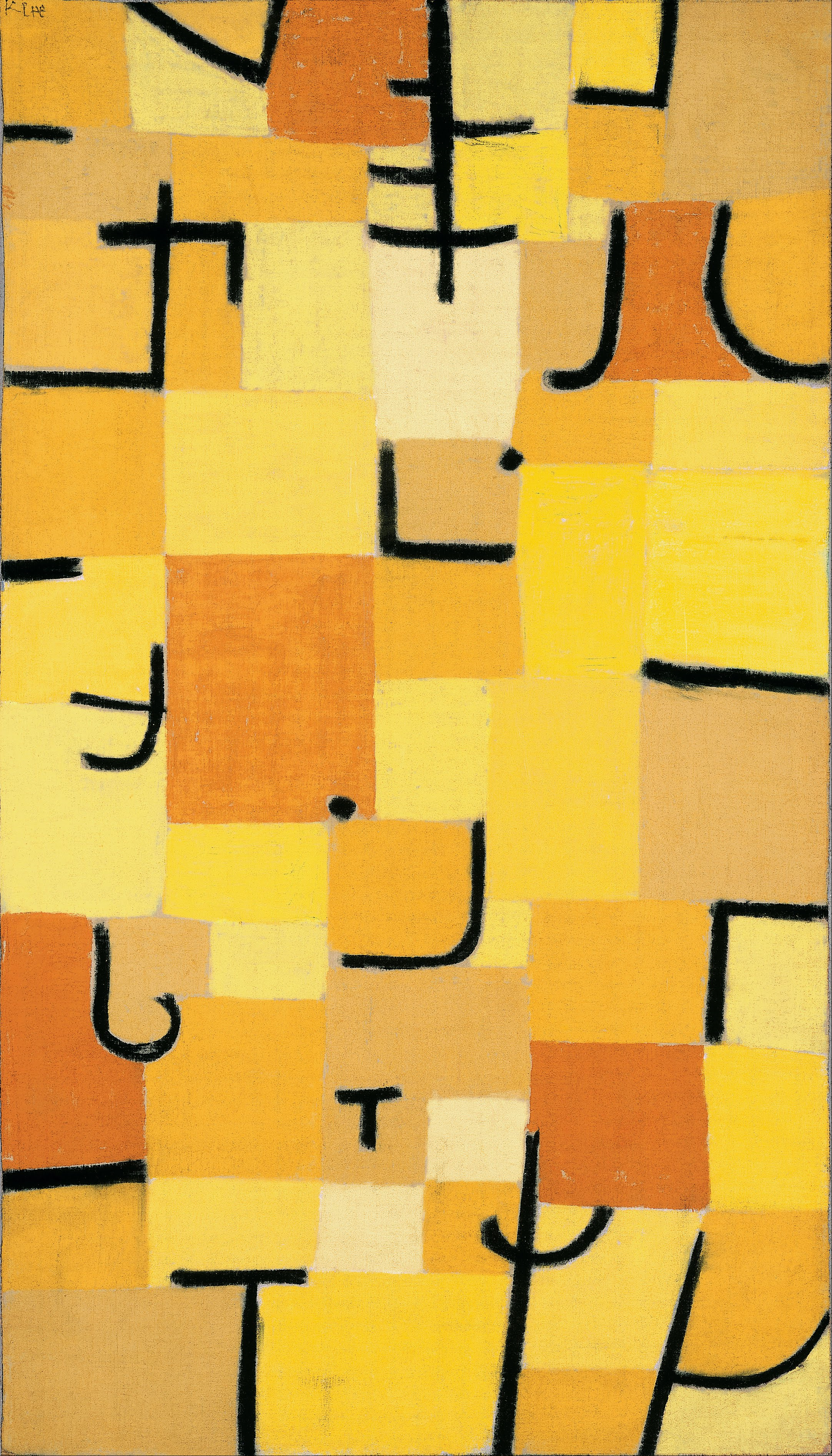
Zeichen in Gelb, 1937, pastel on cotton on colored paste on jute on stretcher frame, Beyeler Foundation, Riehen, near Basel

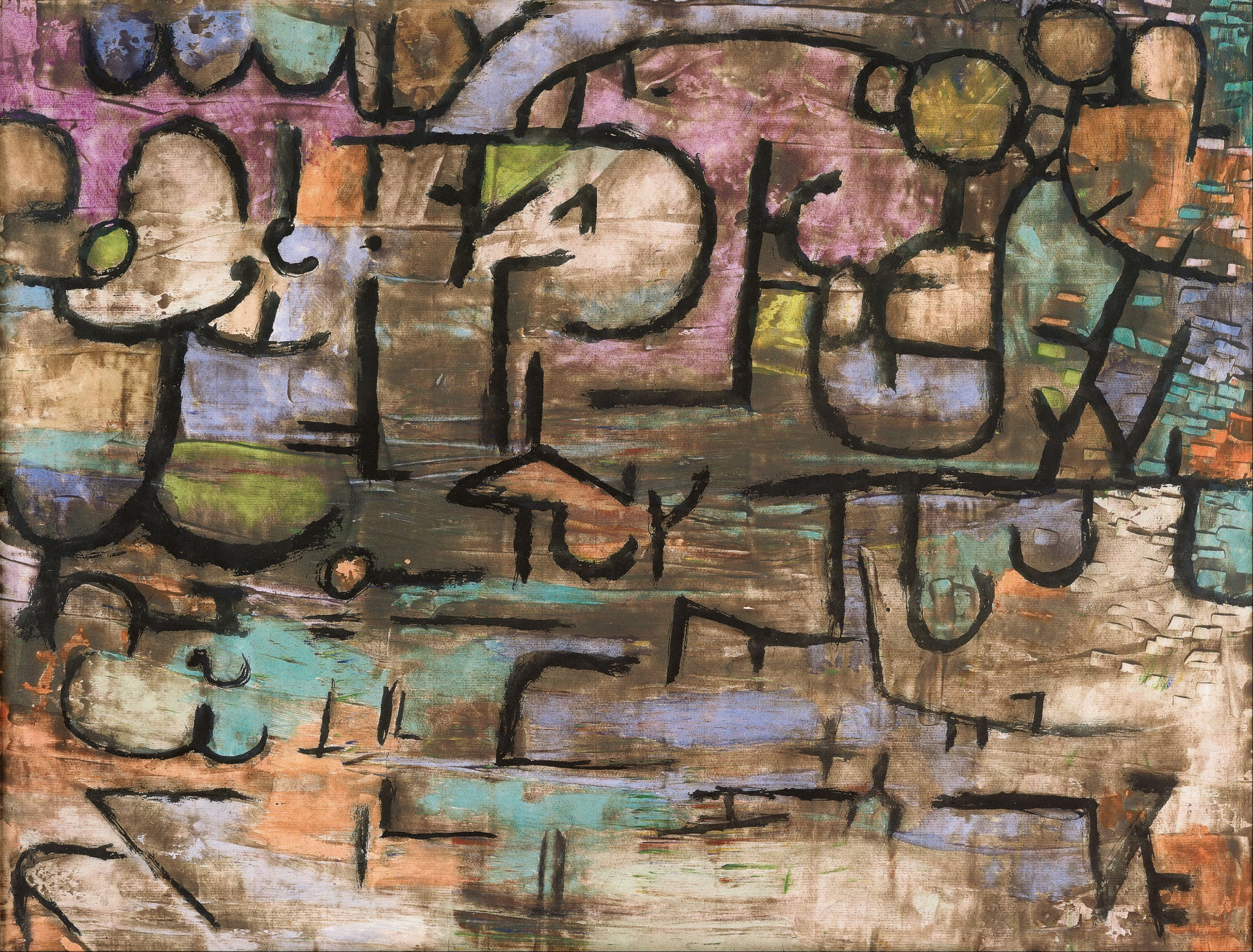
Nach der Überschwemmung, 1936, wallpaper glue and watercolors on Ingres paper on cardboard

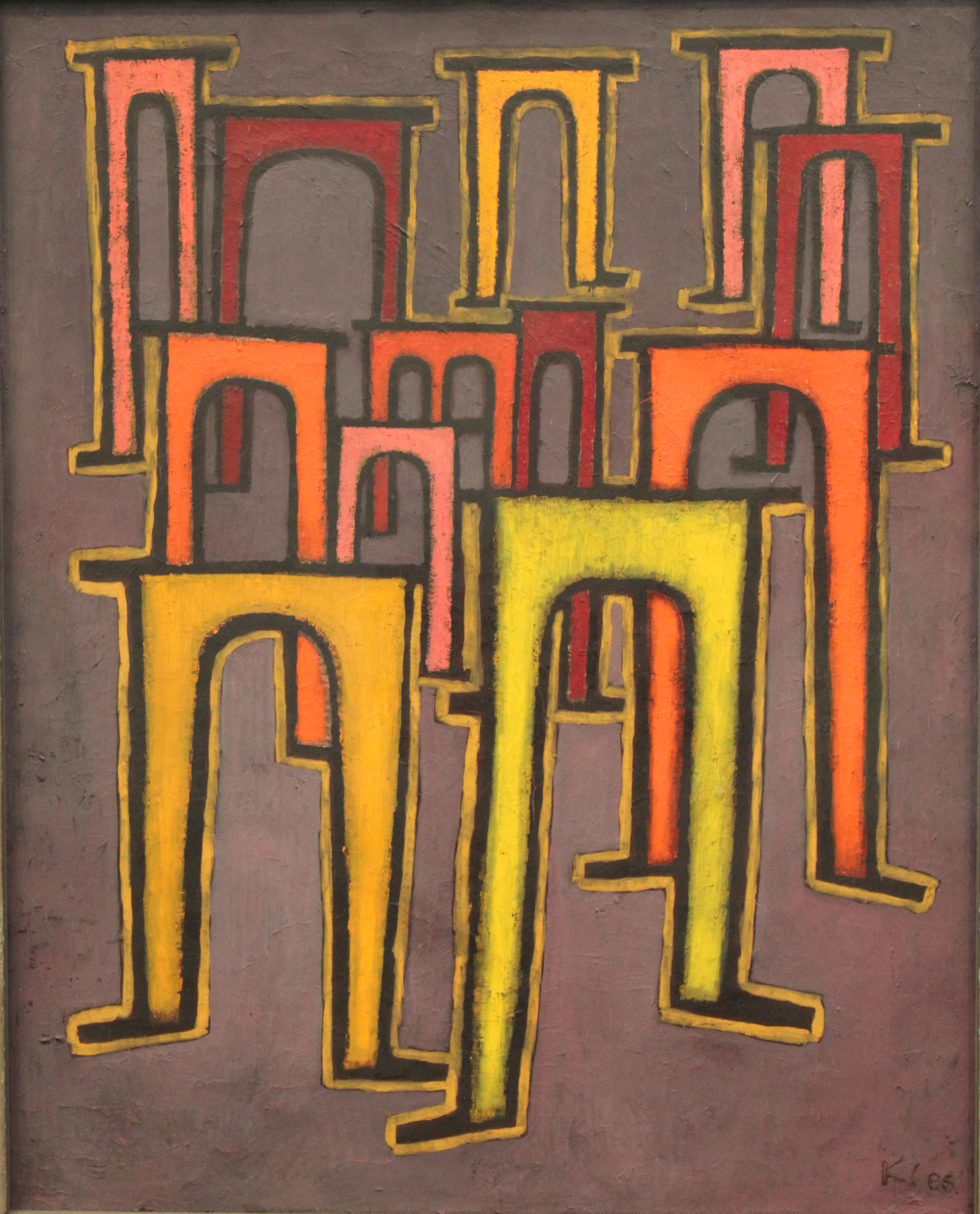
Revolution des Viadukts, 1937, oil on oil grounding on cotton on stretcher frame, Hamburger Kunsthalle

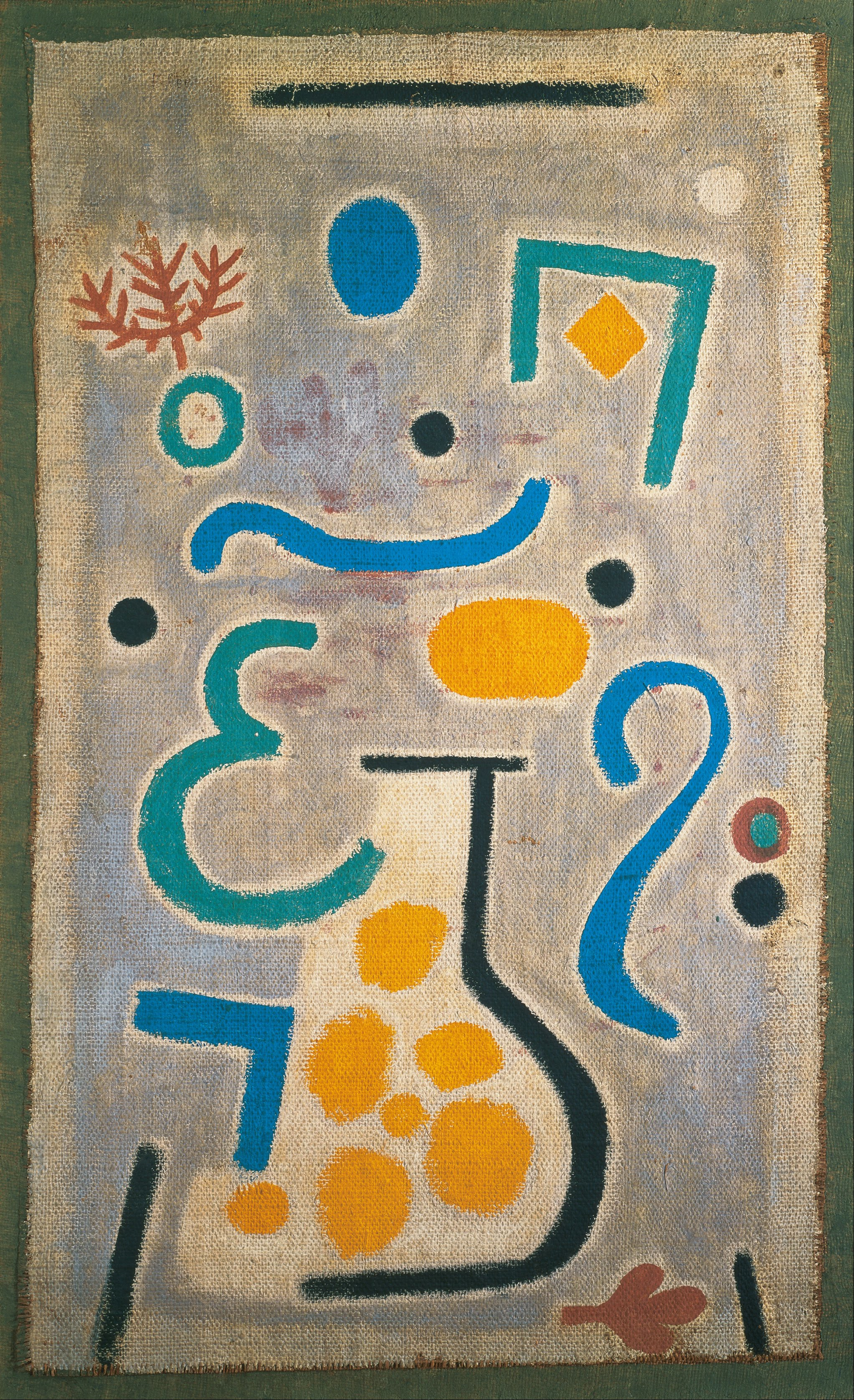
Die Vase, 1938, oil on jute, Fondation Beyeler, Riehen near Basel

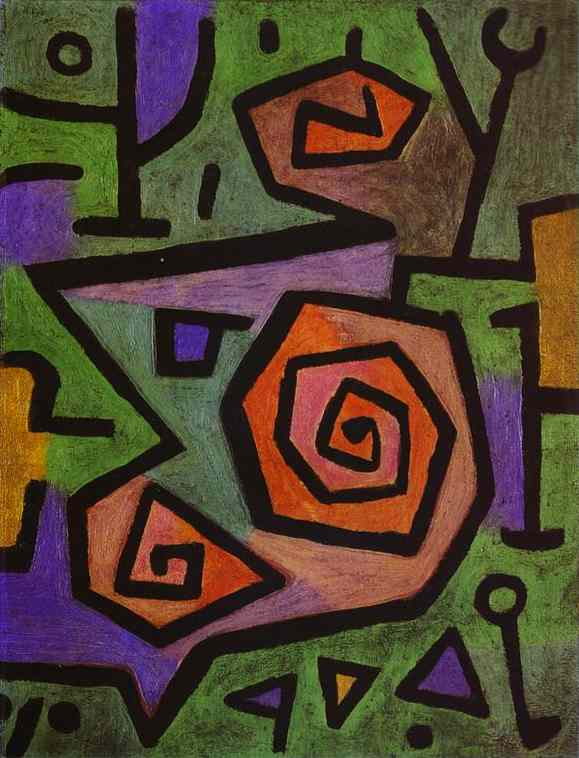
Heroische Rosen (Heroic Roses), 1938, oil on canvas, Kunstsammlung Nordrhein-Westfalen, Düsseldorf

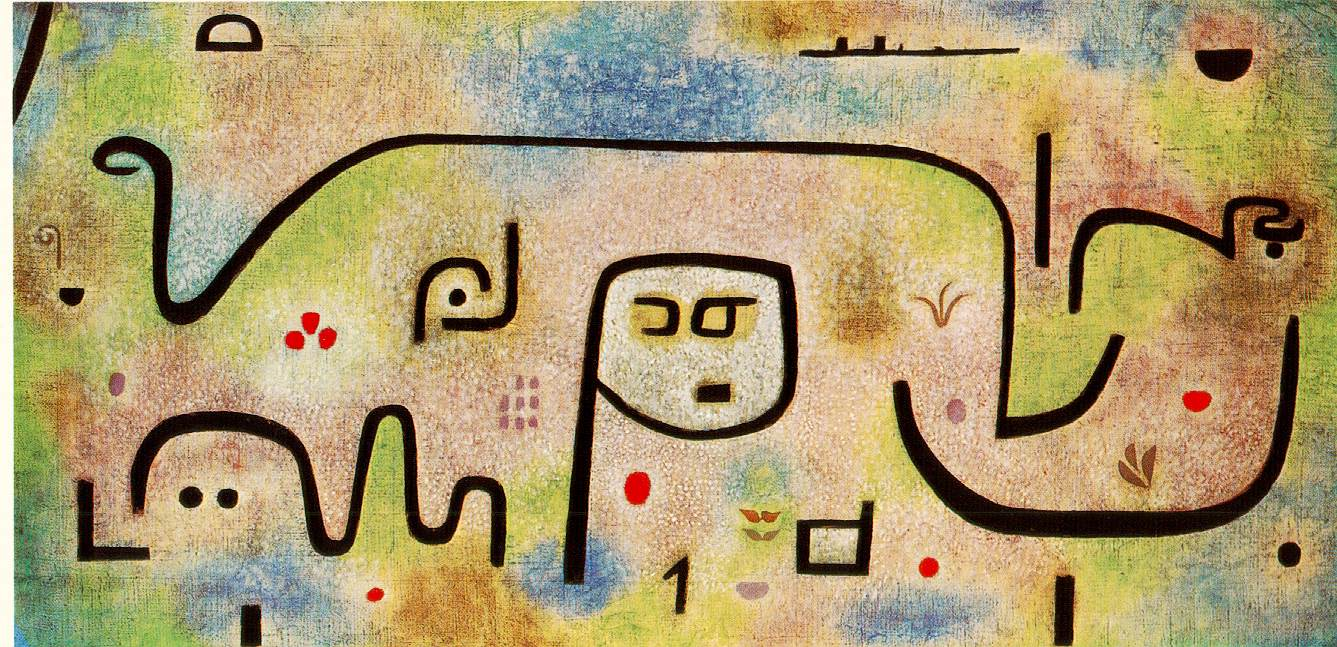
Insula dulcamara, 1938, oil color and colored paste on newsprint on jute on stretcher frame, Zentrum Paul Klee, Bern

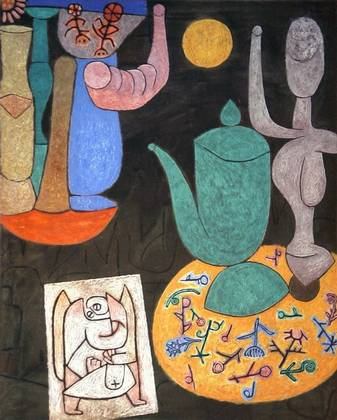
Ohne Titel (Letztes Stillleben), 1940, oil on canvas on stretcher frame, Zentrum Paul Klee, Bern

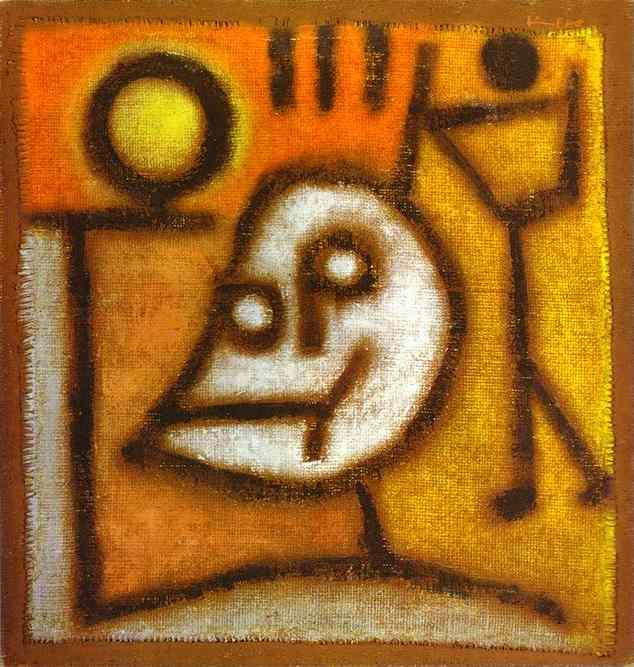
Tod und Feuer (Death and Fire), 1940, oil on distemper on jute, Zentrum Paul Klee, Bern

Klee created in 1940 a picture which strongly differs from the previous works, leaving it unsigned on the scaffold. The comparatively realistic still life, Ohne Titel, later named as Der Todesengel (Angel of Death), depicts flowers, a green pot, sculpture and an angel. The moon on black ground is separated from these groups. During his 60th birthday Klee was photographed in front of this picture.

== Reception and legacy ==
External videos
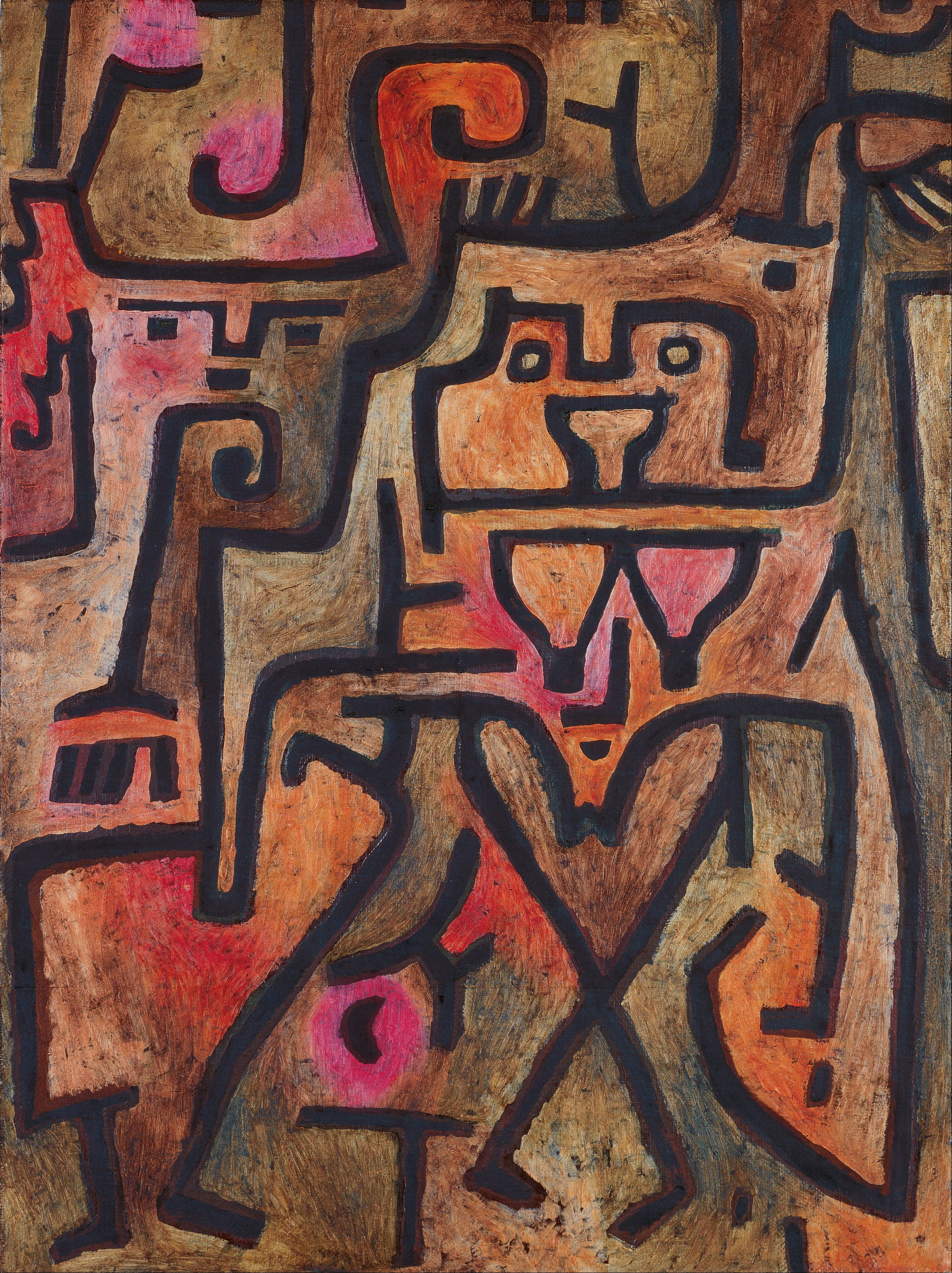
- Paul Klee at Tate Modern on YouTube, (3:38), The Art Fund (UK)

=== Contemporary view ===
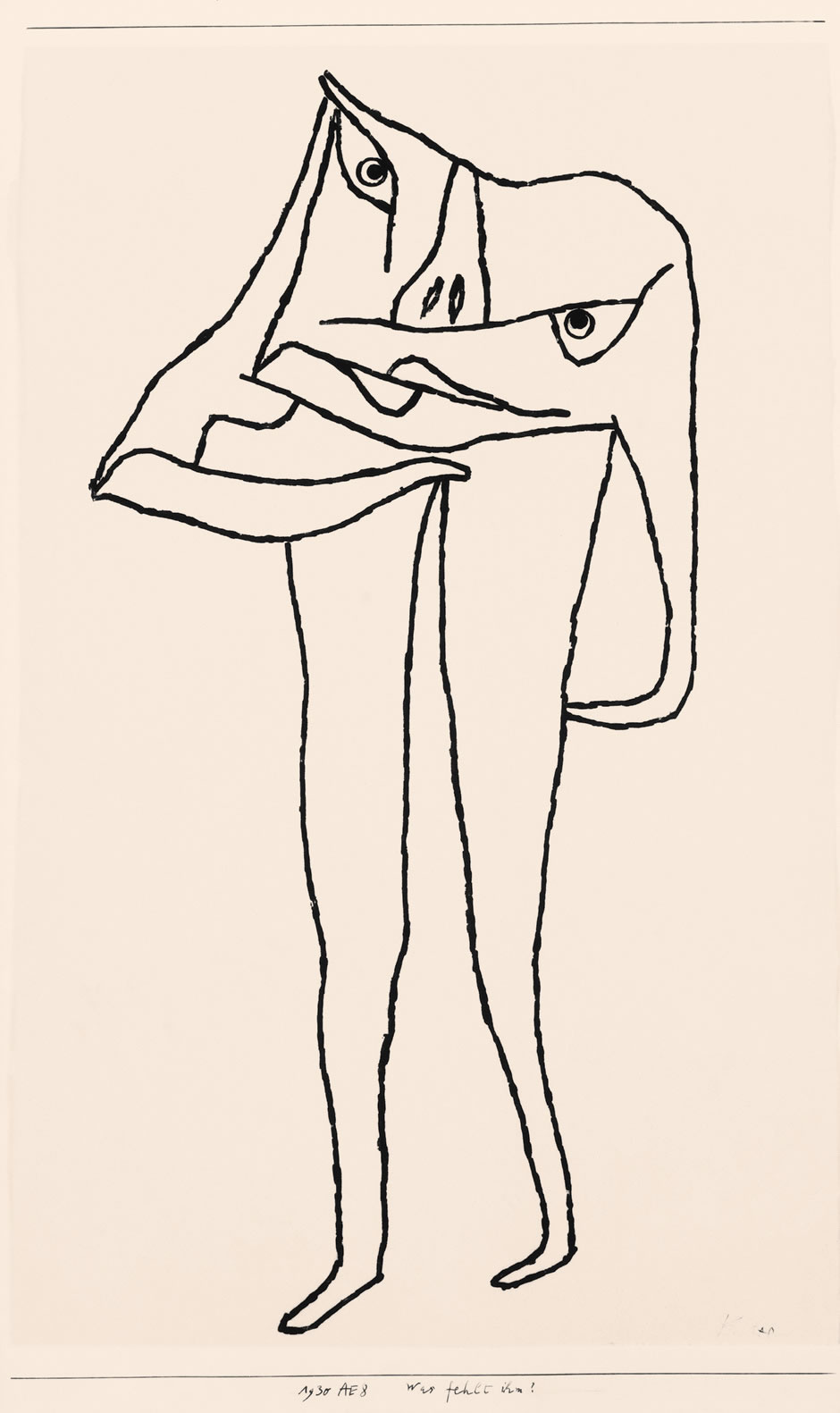
Was fehlt ihm? (What Is He Missing?), 1930, stamp drawing in ink, Ingres paper on cardboard, Fondation Beyeler, Riehen near Basel

Art does not reproduce the visible; rather, it makes visible.

"Klee's act is very prestigious. In a minimum of one line he can reveal his wisdom. He is everything; profound, gentle and many more of the good things, and this because: he is innovative", wrote Oskar Schlemmer, Klee's future artist colleague at the Bauhaus, in his September 1916 diary.

Novelist and Klee's friend Wilhelm Hausenstein wrote in his work Über Expressionismus in der Malerei (On Expressionism in Painting), "Maybe Klee's attitude is in general understandable for musical people—how Klee is one of the most delightsome violinist playing Bach and Händel, who ever walked on earth. […] For Klee, the German classic painter of the Cubism, the world music became his companion, possibly even a part of his art; the composition, written in notes, seems to be not dissimilar."

When Klee visited the Paris surrealism exhibition in 1925, Max Ernst was impressed by his work. His partially morbid motifs appealed to the surrealists. André Breton helped to develop the surrealism and renamed Klee's 1912 painting Zimmerperspektive mit Einwohnern (Room Perspective with People) to chambre spirit in a catalogue. Critic René Crevel called the artist a "dreamer" who "releases a swarm of small lyrical lice from mysterious abysses." Paul Klee's confidante Will Grohmann argued in the Cahiers d'art that he "stands definitely well solid on his feet. He is by no means a dreamer; he is a modern person, who teaches as a professor at the Bauhaus." Whereupon Breton, as Joan Miró remembers, was critical of Klee: "Masson and I have both discovered Paul Klee. Paul Éluard and Crevel are also interested in Klee, and they have even visited him. But Breton despises him."

The art of mentally ill people inspired Klee as well as Kandinsky and Max Ernst, after Hans Prinzhorns book Bildnerei der Geisteskranken (Artistry of the Mentally Ill) was published in 1922. In 1937, some papers from Prinzhorn's anthology were presented at the National Socialist propaganda exhibition "Entartete Kunst" in Munich, with the purpose of defaming the works of Kirchner, Klee, Nolde and other artists by likening them to the works of the insane.

In 1949 Marcel Duchamp commented on Paul Klee: "The first reaction in front of a Klee painting is the very pleasant discovery, what everyone of us could or could have done, to try drawing like in our childhood. Most of his compositions show at the first glance a plain, naive expression, found in children's drawings. […] At a second analyse one can discover a technique, which takes as a basis a large maturity in thinking. A deep understanding of dealing with watercolors to paint a personal method in oil, structured in decorative shapes, let Klee stand out in the contemporary art and make him incomparable. On the other side, his experiment was adopted in the last 30 years by many other artists as a basis for newer creations in the most different areas in painting. His extreme productivity never shows evidence of repetition, as is usually the case. He had so much to say, that a Klee never became another Klee."

One of Klee's paintings, Angelus Novus, was the object of an interpretative text by German philosopher and literary critic Walter Benjamin, who purchased the painting in 1921. In his "Theses on the Philosophy of History" Benjamin suggests that the angel depicted in the painting might be seen as representing the angel of history.

Another aspect of his legacy, and one demonstrating his multi-faceted presence in the modern artistic imagination, is his appeal for those interested in the history of the algorithm as exemplified by Homage to Paul Klee by computer art pioneer Frieder Nake.

=== Musical interpretations ===
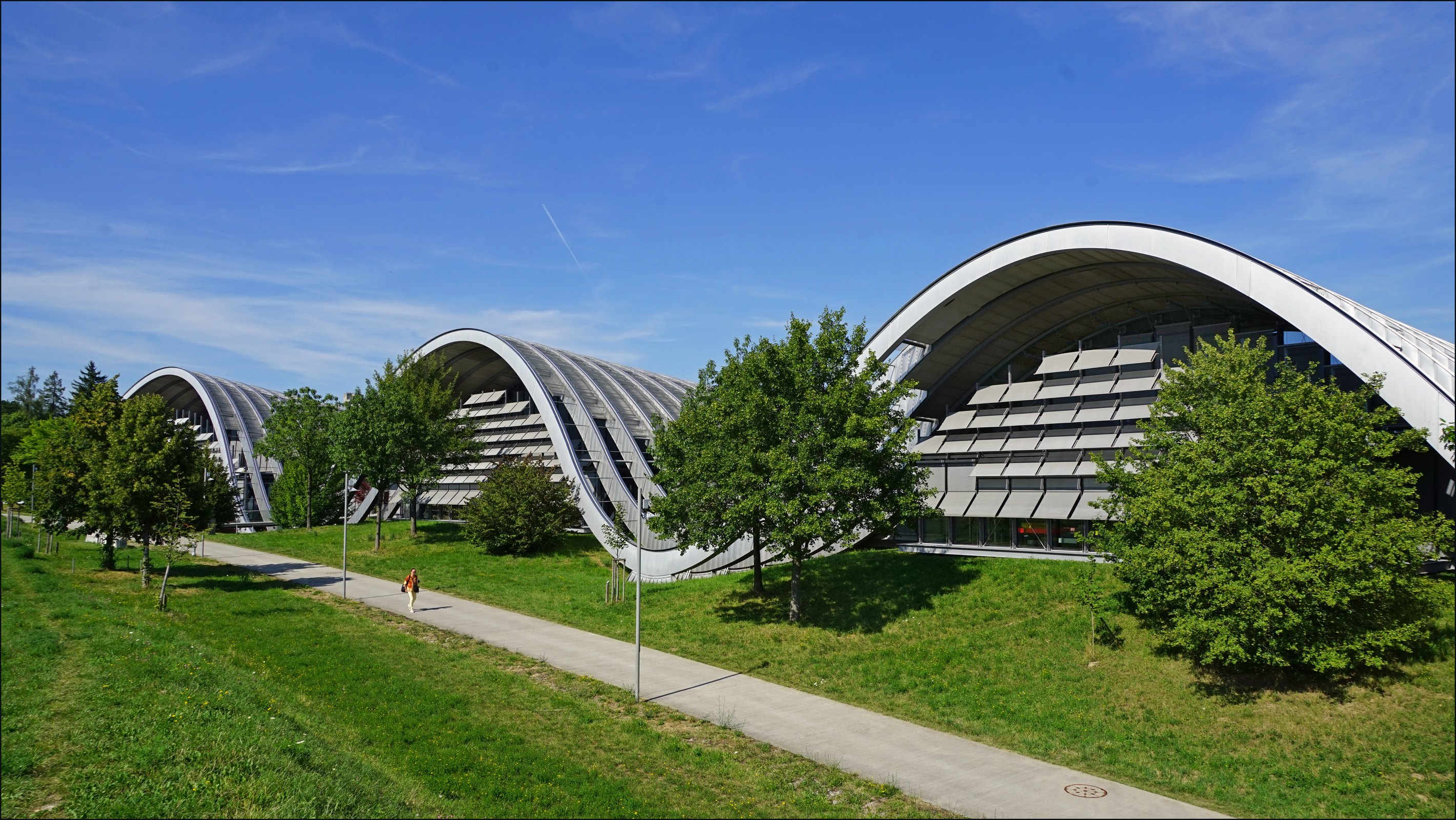
Zentrum Paul Klee in Bern, Switzerland, designed by Renzo Piano

Unlike his taste for adventurous modern experiment in painting, Klee, though musically talented, was attracted to older traditions of music; he appreciated neither composers of the late 19th century, such as Wagner, Bruckner and Mahler, nor contemporary music. Bach and Mozart were for him the greatest composers; he most enjoyed playing the works by the latter.

Klee's work has influenced composers such as Argentinian Roberto García Morillo in 1943, with Tres pinturas de Paul Klee. Others include the American composer David Diamond in 1958, with the four-part Opus Welt von Paul Klee (World of Paul Klee). Gunther Schuller composed Seven Studies on Themes of Paul Klee in the years 1959/60, consisting of Antique Harmonies, Abstract Trio, Little Blue Devil, Twittering Machine, Arab Village, An Eerie Moment, and Pastorale. The Spanish composer Benet Casablancas wrote Alter Klang, Impromptu for Orchestra after Klee (2006); Casablancas is author also of the Retablo on texts by Paul Klee, Cantata da Camera for Soprano, Mezzo and Piano (2007). In 1950, Giselher Klebe performed his orchestral work Die Zwitschermaschine with the subtitle Metamorphosen über das Bild von Paul Klee at the Donaueschinger Musiktage. 8 Pieces on Paul Klee is the title of the debut album by the Ensemble Sortisatio, recorded February and March 2002 in Leipzig and August 2002 in Lucerne, Switzerland. The composition "Wie der Klee vierblättrig wurde" (How the clover became four-leaved) was inspired by the watercolor painting Hat Kopf, Hand, Fuss und Herz (1930), Angelus Novus and Hauptweg und Nebenwege.

In 1968, a jazz group called The National Gallery featuring composer Chuck Mangione released the album Performing Musical Interpretations of the Paintings of Paul Klee. In 1995 the Greek experimental filmmaker, Kostas Sfikas, created a film based entirely on Paul Klee's paintings. The film is entitled "Paul Klee's Prophetic Bird of Sorrows", and draws its title from Klee's Landscape with Yellow Birds. It was made using portions and cutouts from Paul Klee's paintings.

==== Additional musical interpretations ====
- Sándor Veress: Hommage à Paul Klee (1951), phantasy for two pianos and strings
- Peter Maxwell Davies: Five Klee-Pictures (1962), orchestral
- Harrison Birtwistle: Carmen Arcadiae Mechanicae Perpetuum (The Perpetual Song of Mechanical Arcadia) (1977), for orchestra
- Edison Denisov: Drei Bilder von Paul Klee (Three Pictures of Paul Klee) (1985), for six players (Diana im Herbstwind − Senecio – Kind auf der Freitreppe)
- Tōru Takemitsu: All in Twilight (1987), for guitar
- John Woolrich: The kingdom of dreams (1989), for oboe and piano ('Landscape with Yellow Birds', 'The Bavarian Don Giovanni', 'Tale à la Hoffmann', 'Fish Magic')
- Leo Brouwer: Sonata (1990), for guitar
- Walter Steffens: Vier Aquarelle nach Paul Klee (Four Watercolor Pictures to Paul Klee) (1991), op. 63, for recorder(s)
- Tan Dun: Death and Fire (1992), Dialogue with Paul Klee, orchestral
- Judith Weir: Heroic Strokes of the Bow (1992), for orchestra
- Jean-Luc Darbellay: Ein Garten für Orpheus (A Garden for Orpheus) (1996), for six instruments
- Michael Denhoff: Haupt- und Nebenwege (Main and Sideways) (1998), for strings and piano
- Iris Szeghy: Ad parnassum (2005), for strings
- Patrick van Deurzen: Six: a line is a dot that went for a walk (2006), for Flugelhorn, DoubleBass & Percussion
- Jim McNeely: Paul Klee (2007), Jazz album written for the Swiss Jazz Orchestra composed of 8 pieces
- Jason Wright Wingate: Symphony No. 2: Kleetüden; Variationen für Orchester nach Paul Klee (Variations for Orchestra after Paul Klee) (2009), for orchestra in 27 movements
- Sakanaction: "Klee" (2010), from the album Kikuuiki; a song envisioned as a dialogue with Klee's paintings.
- Ludger Stühlmeyer: Super flumina Babylonis [An den Wassern zu Babel]. (2019), fantasia for organ (Introduzione, Scontro, Elegie, Appassionato) on an aquarelle by Paul Klee.
- George Crumb: Metamorphoses, Book 1: No. 1, Black Prince; No. 2, Goldfish and Metamorphoses, Book 2: No. 1, Ancient Sound, Abstract on Black; No. 2, Landscape with Yellow Birds (2019), for piano after paintings of the same name by Paul Klee

=== Architectural honors ===
Since 1995, the "Paul Klee-Archiv" (Paul Klee archive) of the University of Jena houses an extensive collection of works by Klee. It is located within the art history department, established by Franz-Joachim Verspohl. It encompasses the private library of book collector Rolf Sauerwein which contains nearly 700 works from 30 years composed of monographs about Klee, exhibition catalogues, extensive secondary literature as well as originally illustrated issues, a postcard and a signed photography portrait of Klee.

Architect Renzo Piano constructed the Zentrum Paul Klee in June 2005. Located in Bern, the museum exhibits about 150 (of 4000 Klee works overall) in a six-month rotation, as it is impossible to show all of his works at once. Furthermore, his pictures require rest periods; they contain relatively photosensitive colors, inks and papers, which may bleach, change, turn brown and become brittle if exposed to light for too long. The San Francisco Museum of Modern Art has a comprehensive Klee collection, donated by Carl Djerassi. Other exhibitions include the Sammlung Rosengart in Luzern, the Albertina in Wien and the Berggruen Museum in Berlin. Schools in Gersthofen, Lübeck; Klein-Winternheim, Overath; his place of birth Münchenbuchsee and Düsseldorf bear his name.

=== Nazi looting and restitutions ===
In addition to Klee's works that Nazis seized from museums, several of his artworks were looted by Nazis from Jewish collectors and their families. Some of these have been restituted while others have been the subject of lawsuits and claims for restitution. One of the most famous claims was for Klee's Swamp Legend.

=== Journal ===
The Zwitscher-Maschine. Journal on Paul Klee (ISSN 2297-6809 ) is a publication dedicated to international studies on Paul Klee. It encompasses art historical and art technological studies, as well as literary or philosophical texts on the life and work of Paul Klee. The journal is freely accessible to authors from the international Klee research community, following an open-access approach known as the 'golden road' primary publishing strategy.

== Publications ==
- Jardi, Enric (1991). Paul Klee, Rizzoli Intl Pubns, ISBN 0-8478-1343-6
- Kagan, Andrew (1993). Paul Klee at the Guggenheim Museum (exhibition catalogue) Introduction by Lisa Dennison, essay by Andrew Kagan. 208 pages. English and Spanish editions. 1993, ISBN 978-0-89207-106-7
- Cappelletti, Paolo (2003). L'inafferrabile visione. Pittura e scrittura in Paul Klee (in Italian). Milan: Jaca Book. ISBN 88-16-40611-9
- Partsch, Susanna (2007). Klee (reissue) (in German). Cologne: Benedikt Taschen. ISBN 978-3-8228-6361-9.
- Rudloff, Diether (1982). Unvollendete Schöpfung: Künstler im zwanzigsten Jahrhundert (in German). Urachhaus. ISBN 978-3-87838-368-0.
- Baumgartner, Michael; Klingsöhr-Leroy, Cathrin; Schneider, Katja (2010). Franz Marc, Paul Klee: Dialog in Bildern (in German) (1st ed.). Wädenswil: Nimbus Kunst und Bücher. ISBN 978-3-907142-50-9.
- Giedion-Welcker, Carola (1967). Klee (in German). Reinbek: Rowohlt. ISBN 978-3-499-50052-7.
- Glaesemer, Jürgen; Kersten, Wolfgang; Traffelet, Ursula (1996). Paul Klee: Leben und Werk (in German). Ostfildern: Hatje Cantz. ISBN 978-3-7757-0241-6.
- Rümelin, Christian (2004). Paul Klee: Leben und Werk. Munich: C.H. Beck. ISBN 3-406-52190-8.
- Lista, Marcella (2011). Paul Klee, 1879-1940 : polyphonies. Arles: Actes Sud. ISBN 978-2330000530

=== Books, essays and lectures by Paul Klee ===
- 1922 Beiträge zur bildnerischen Formlehre ('Contributions to a pictorial theory of form', part of his 1921–22 lectures at the Bauhaus)
- 1923 Wege des Naturstudiums ('Ways of Studying Nature'), 4 pages. Published in the catalogue for the Erste Bauhaus Ausstellung (First Bauhaus Exhibition) in Summer 1923. Also published in Paul Klee Notebooks vol 1.
- 1924 Über moderne Kunst ('On Modern Art'), lecture held at Paul Klee's exhibition at the Kunstverein in Jena on 26 January 1924
- 1924 Pädagogisches Skizzenbuch ('Pedagogical Sketchbook')
- 1949 Documente und Bilder aus den Jahren 1896–1930, ('Documents and images from the years 1896–1930'), Berne, Benteli
- 1956 Graphik, ('Graphics'), Berne, Klipstein & Kornfeld
- 1956 Schriften zur Form und Gestaltungslehre ('Writings on form and design theory') edited by Jürg Spiller (English edition: 'Paul Klee Notebooks')
  - 1956 Band I: Das bildnerische Denken., ('Volume I: the creative thinking'). 572 pages review. (English translation from German by Ralph Manheim: 'The thinking eye')
  - 1964 Band 2: Unendliche Naturgeschichte ('Volume 2: Infinite Natural History') (English translation from German by Heinz Norden: 'The Nature of Nature')
- 1964 The Diaries of Paul Klee 1898–1918 ed. Felix Klee Berkeley, University of California
- 1976 Schriften, Rezensionen und Aufsätze edited by Ch. Geelhaar, Köln

=== Poetry ===
- 1960 Gedichte, poems, edited by Felix Klee, Zurich
- 1962 Some poems by Paul Klee (translated by Anselm Hollo), Scorpion Press, London
- 1974 Three Painter-Poets, Arp/Schwitters/Klee, Selected Poems (trans. Harriett Watts), Penguin Modern European Poets, 1974, ISBN 978-0-14-042173-6
- 2006 Paul Klee, Poet/Painter, K. Porter Aichele, Camden House, 2006, ISBN 978-1-57113-343-4

== See also ==
- Zentrum Paul Klee

== Notes and references ==
=== Notes ===
- ^{a} Paul Klee's father was a German citizen; his mother was Swiss. Swiss law determined citizenship along paternal lines, and thus Paul inherited his father's German citizenship. He served in the German army during World War I. Klee grew up in Berne, Switzerland, and returned there often, even before his final emigration from Germany in 1933. He died before his application for Swiss citizenship was processed.
- ^{b} German: Werftkompanie, lit. 'shipyard company'.

== Sources ==
Podcasts

- Interview with Fabienne Eggelhöfer (Chief curator of Zentrum Paul Klee, Berne) about Paul Klee's life and art on bauhaus faces podcast, host: Dr. Anja Guttenberger, published on 25 July, 2025
- Paul Klee's Playlist, podcast about Klee's relationship with music, host: Zentrum Paul Klee, published 2025
- Mapping Klee, podcast about Paul Klee's journeys, host: Zentrum Paul Klee, published 2020
