= Der Ararat =

Arts magazine in Germany (1918–1921)

- Categories: Political magazine; Arts magazine
- Publisher: Goltzverlag
- Founded: 1918
- Final issue: 1921
- Country: Germany
- Based in: Munich
- Language: German

Der Ararat was a Dadaist magazine published in Munich between 1918 and 1921. Its subtitle was Glossen, Skizzen und Notizen zur Neuen Kunst (German: Glosses, sketches and notes on new art).

== History and profile ==
Der Ararat founded in 1918 by Hans Goltz and published by Goltzverlag based in Munich. initially, the magazine focused on politics until December 1919 and then, featured articles on modern and avant-garde art.

Der Ararat covered discussions and reviews of Dadaist art, and included contributions from notable figures such as Soviet art critic Konstantin Umansky, who published articles about Vladimir Tatlin’s art. The magazine folded in 1921. Some issues of Der Ararat were archived by the University of Iowa.
