= Hans Goltz =

German art dealer

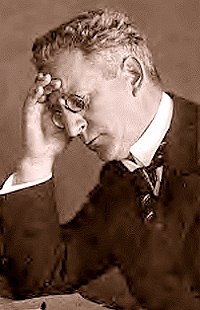
Hans Goltz

Hans Goltz (11 August 1873 in Elbing (Elbląg), Prussia, Germany - 21 October 1927 in Baden-Baden) was a German art dealer, known as a pioneer of modernism in art. He was the editor of a political and arts magazine Der Ararat.
