= Limits of Reason =

1927 painting by Paul Klee

The Limits of Reason
- Grenzen des Verstandes (German), The Bounds of the Intellect; The Limits of Understanding; Boundaries of the Mind (English)
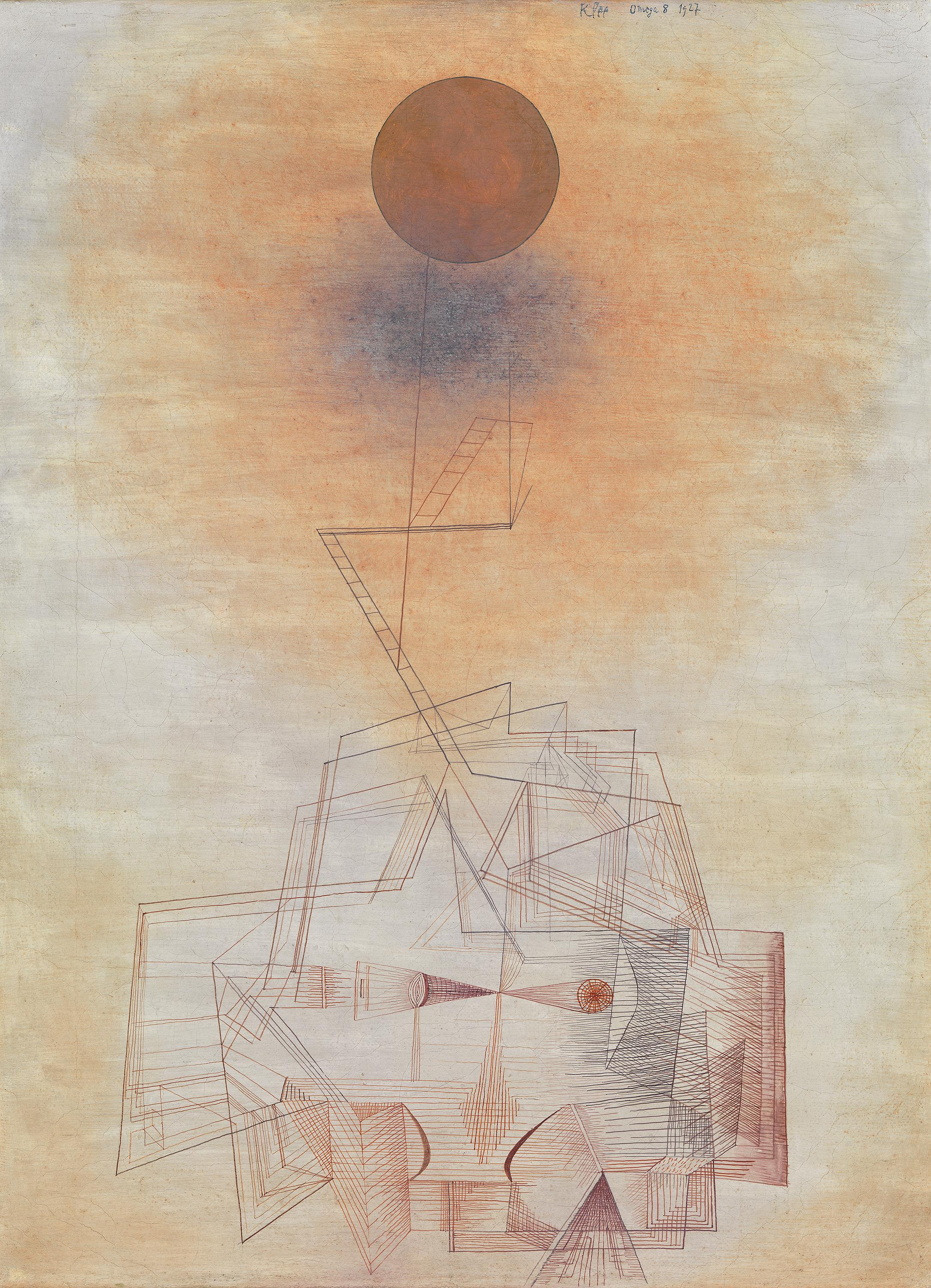
- Reproduction in René Crevel's Paul Klee (1930)
- Artist: Paul Klee
- Year: 1927
- Type: Painting (oil, watercolor and pencil on canvas) Canvas tempera
- Dimensions: 56.44 cm × 41.50 cm (22.22 in × 16.34 in)
- Location: Pinakothek der Moderne, Munich

Limits of Reason (German: Grenzen des Verstandes) is a 1927 painting by Paul Klee (1879–1940). It is in the permanent collection of the Pinakothek der Moderne in central Munich's Kunstareal.

== Provenance ==
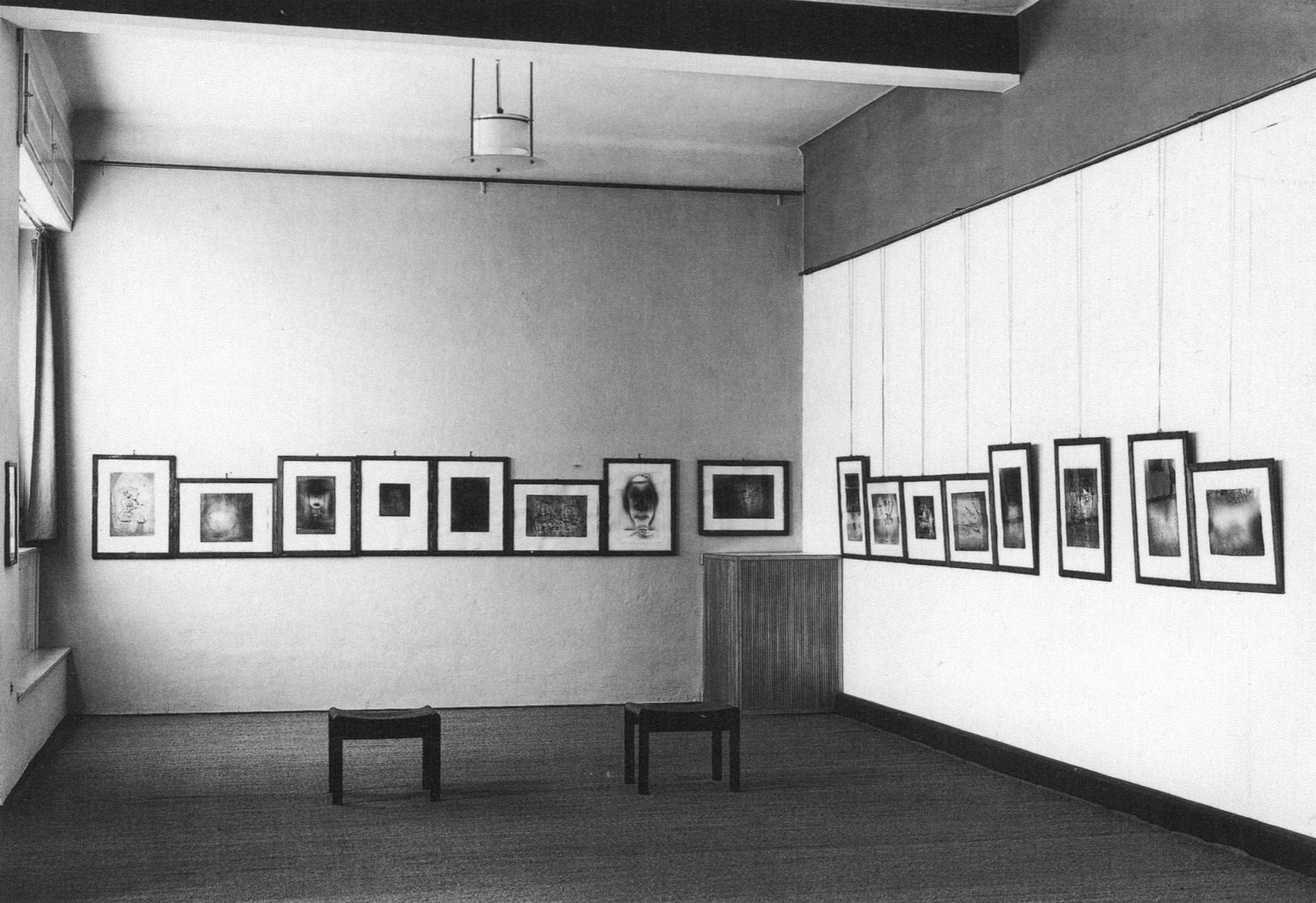
Galerie Neue Kunst Fides 1926

The Limits of Reason was first exhibited in 1926 in Rudolf Probst's Galerie Neue Kunst Fides in Dresden, along with 99 other tempera/water colors by Klee.

German art dealer, art collector, journalist and publisher Alfred Flechtheim (1878–1937) acquired it for his private collection in 1928 and displayed it in his gallery in both 1928 and 1929. In 1931, he loaned it to the MoMa in New York.

By 1958 the painting, which has the inventory number 14234, was owned by Theodor and Woty Werner. In 1971, with Erich Steingräber as museum director, through the Werners' legacy, Grenzen des Verstandes became part of the permanent collection of the Bavarian State Painting Collection.

== Description ==
The work has been described as emblematic of "his most prolific period as a teacher" at the Bauhaus. The static nature of the perfect red sphere which appears frozen and floating in space, in the white primed canvas of the upper part of the painting, contrasts with the dynamic complicated filigree linear structure of the lower part of the painting. This work is reminiscent of that of Kasimir Malevich in both color and structure. In her article in The Atlantic, Veronique Greenwood described the gap between the two as a gap between the human capacity of reason and the human desire to fully understand.

== Background ==
The painting was produced during his "most prolific period"—the years spent at the Bauhaus, a German art school—which was established by Walter Gropius in Weimar in 1919 and closed in 1933, "when the Nazis enforced their own definitions of art and its functions". Klee, alongside artists such as Gropius, Wassily Kandinsky, Ludwig Mies van der Rohe, Anni and Josef Albers, was a teacher and resident artist. In his 2009 book, Nicolas Fox Weber The Bauhaus Group: Six Masters of Modernism, Weber wrote that Klee "brought the liberating spirit of surrealism to the Bauhaus".

The 1988 book published by MoMa, entitled Paul Klee: The Berggruen Klee Collection in The Metropolitan Museum of Art, described Klee as one of the most popular artists in the 20th century and one of "the most written about". (Note: The MoMa holds the largest collection of Klee's work in North America which is featured in a 1988 book published by MoMa, entitled, Paul Klee: The Berggruen Klee Collection in The Metropolitan Museum of Art. The book includes the entire MoMa collection donated by Heinz Berggruen, a leading art dealer and collector form the period following World War II.) Klee produced over 9,000 works.

Klee was the son of a musicologist and he drew parallels between sound and art.

The painting has been described as surrealist. Along with other works by Klee during the Bauhaus period in Dessau, it has also been called interpretative, and later, constructivist. His work has been compared to works by Malevich, Gabo and Tatlin. This painting has similarities to other works by Klee, such his Rope Tilers.

== Critical analysis ==
In his 1930 publication Paul Klee, René Crevel contrasted Klee's work with that of romanticism, situating Klee as an artist after 'the Flood'. Crevel described a ladder, or a set of stairs, lost in red ether, as the only means of us to take a leap into the impossible, to jump so high, as if on a trampoline, and to latch onto the moon... "cette échelle rouge perdue au sein de l'éther tourterelle. Cette échelle, voilà bien l'escalier, le seul qui puisse nous mener jusqu'au tremplin d'où nous sauterons, à pieds joints, dans l'impossible, puisqu'il s'agit enfin de décrocher la lune." A black and white reproduction of Limits of Reason was included in this book.

== Grenzen des Verstandes ==
In 2006/07, the Hungarian composer and pianist Andor Losonczy (1932–2018) created a piece with the same name as the 1927 painting, Grenzen des Verstandes, as part of this Klee project. It was premiered by the Leipzig Ensemble Sortisatio in the 2008 concert series musica aperta at the Kunstmuseum Winterthur a gallery in Winterthur in the canton of Zürich in northern Switzerland. The Kunstmuseum was built in 1915 and is operated by the local Kunstverein. Klee's art work has been the inspiration for a number of musical pieces including, the debut album of the Ensemble Sortisatio, entitled 8 Pieces on Paul Klee, which was recorded in 2002 in Leipzig and then in Lucerne, Switzerland. Creative Works Records published the series in 2003.

== See also ==
- List of works by Paul Klee
- Paul Klee Notebooks
- Zentrum Paul Klee
