= Heroic Roses =

Painting by Paul Klee

- Artist: Paul Klee
- Year: 1938
- Medium: oil on stained canvas
- Dimensions: 68 cm × 52 cm (27 in × 20 in)
- Location: Kunstsammlung Nordrhein-Westfalen; Düsseldorf

Heroic Roses, known in German as Heroische Rosen, is an oil-on-stained-canvas Expressionist painting by Swiss-German painter Paul Klee, from 1938. It is held at the Kunstsammlung Nordrhein-Westfalen, in Düsseldorf.

== Meaning and history ==
Heroic Roses was one of Klee's paintings in the final period before his death on June 29, 1940. In 1935 Klee started to suffer from scleroderma, which took a toll on his health. His paintings during this period tended to be simpler and representative of the suffering he was going through.

== Hieroglyphics ==
The painting also represents hieroglyphics, an interest of Klee's during this time, which can also be seen in many of his late 1930s and early 1940s paintings, such as Insula dulcamara (1938) and Death and Fire (1940).

== See also ==
- List of works by Paul Klee
