= Death and Fire =

1940 painting by Paul Klee

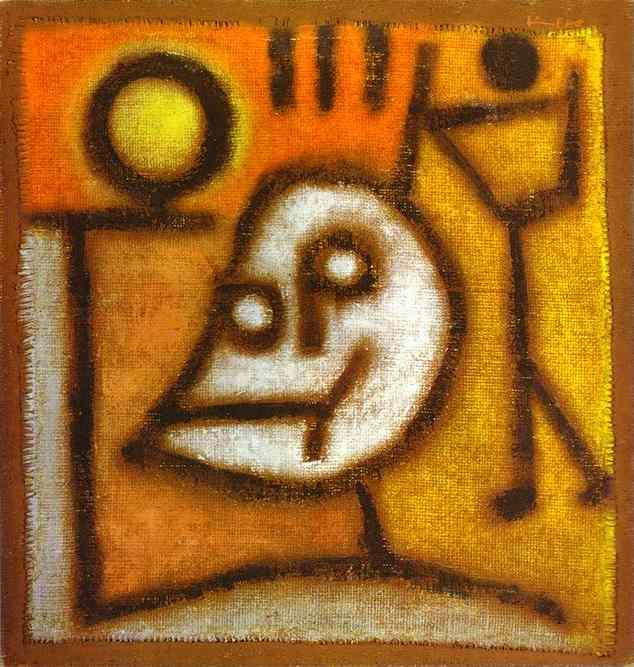
- Artist: Paul Klee
- Year: 1940
- Type: Oil and coloured paste on burlap
- Dimensions: 43 cm × 43 cm (17 in × 17 in)
- Location: Zentrum Paul Klee; Bern

Death and Fire, known in German as Tod und Feuer, is an expressionist painting by Paul Klee, from 1940. It is on display at Zentrum Paul Klee, in Bern.

== Meaning and History ==
Death and Fire was one of Klee's last paintings, shortly before his death on June 29, 1940. In 1935 Klee started to suffer from scleroderma, which caused symptoms such as fatigue, skin rashes, difficulty in swallowing, shortness of breath and pain in the joints of his hands. His paintings during this period tended to be simpler and representative of the suffering he was going through. "Tod", the German word for death, is a common motif throughout this painting. It can be seen most distinctly in the features of the face, though the "d" and "t" are rotated. The word can also be seen in the figure's raised arm as the "T", the yellow orb as the "O", and the figure's head (or torso) as the "D".

== Hieroglyphics ==
The painting also represents hieroglyphics, an interest of Klee's during this period, which can also be seen in many of his other late 1930s paintings, such as Insula dulcamara (1938) and Heroic Roses (1938).

== See also ==
- List of works by Paul Klee
