= Angel, Still Groping =

1939 painting by Paul Klee

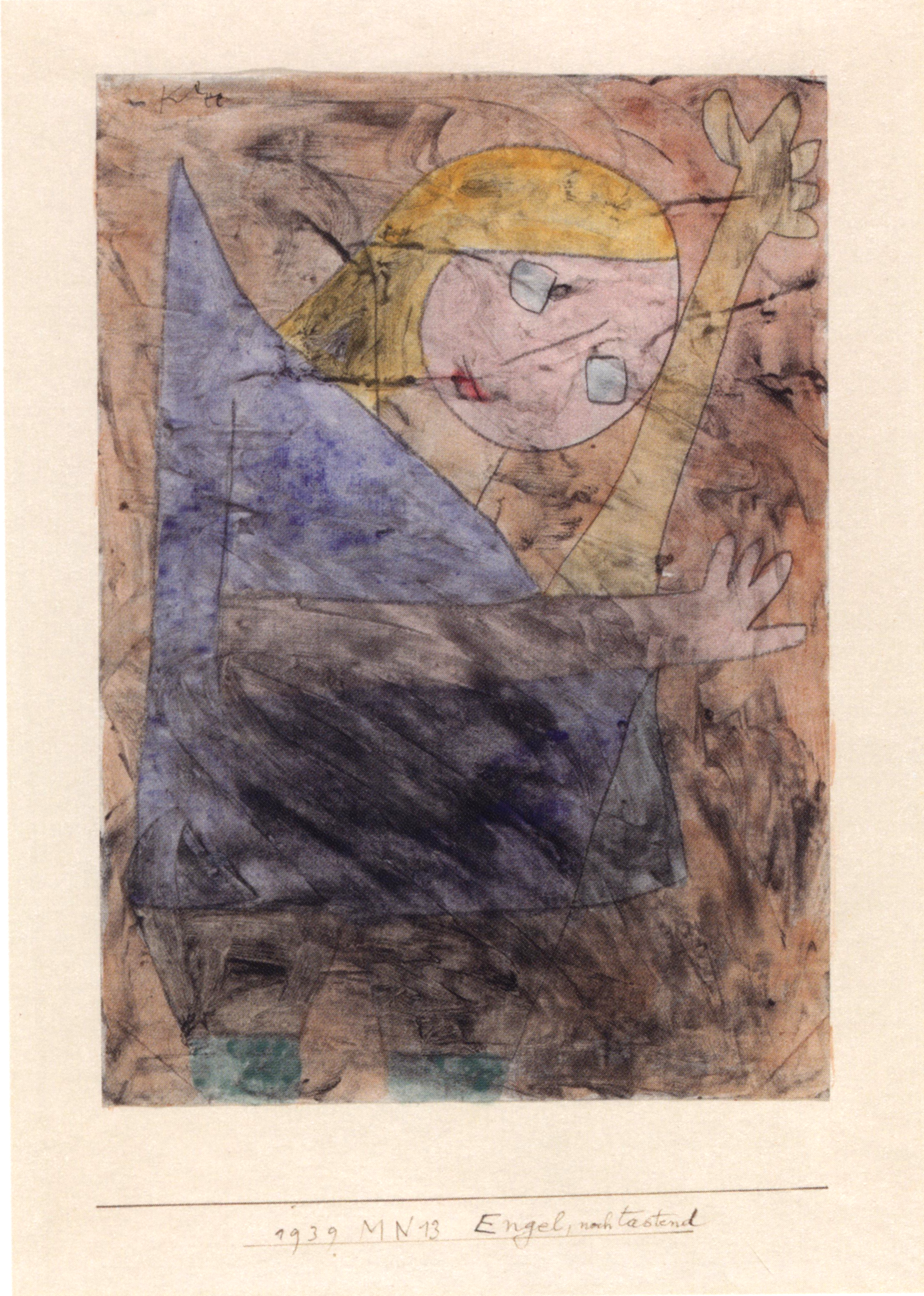
- Artist: Paul Klee
- Year: 1939
- Type: Watercolor on paper
- Dimensions: 29.4 cm × 20.8 cm (11.6 in × 8.2 in)
- Location: Zentrum Paul Klee; Bern

Angel, Still Groping is a watercolor on paper painting by Swiss-German painter Paul Klee, from 1939. It is held at the Zentrum Paul Klee, in Bern.

== History and description ==
Klee, after his dismissal in Germany as a professor, and being labeled as a “degenerate artist” following the Nazi takeover, in 1933, settled in Switzerland, his country of birth. He was also diagnosed with an incurable disease. In his final years, Klee painted 28 paintings of angels, in 1939, and another four in 1940, the year of his death. His angels are depicted with childish humour, and are not transcendent mystical beings.

Klee's angel in this painting has a childish appearance, still groping, with blond hair, large blue eyes, and a red mouth, and is tilted down to the right of the painting. The outstretched arm of the angel, with three fingers and his thumb pointing forward, divides the image into a light upper and dark lower half.

== See also ==
- List of works by Paul Klee
