= Ad Parnassum =

1932 painting by Paul Klee

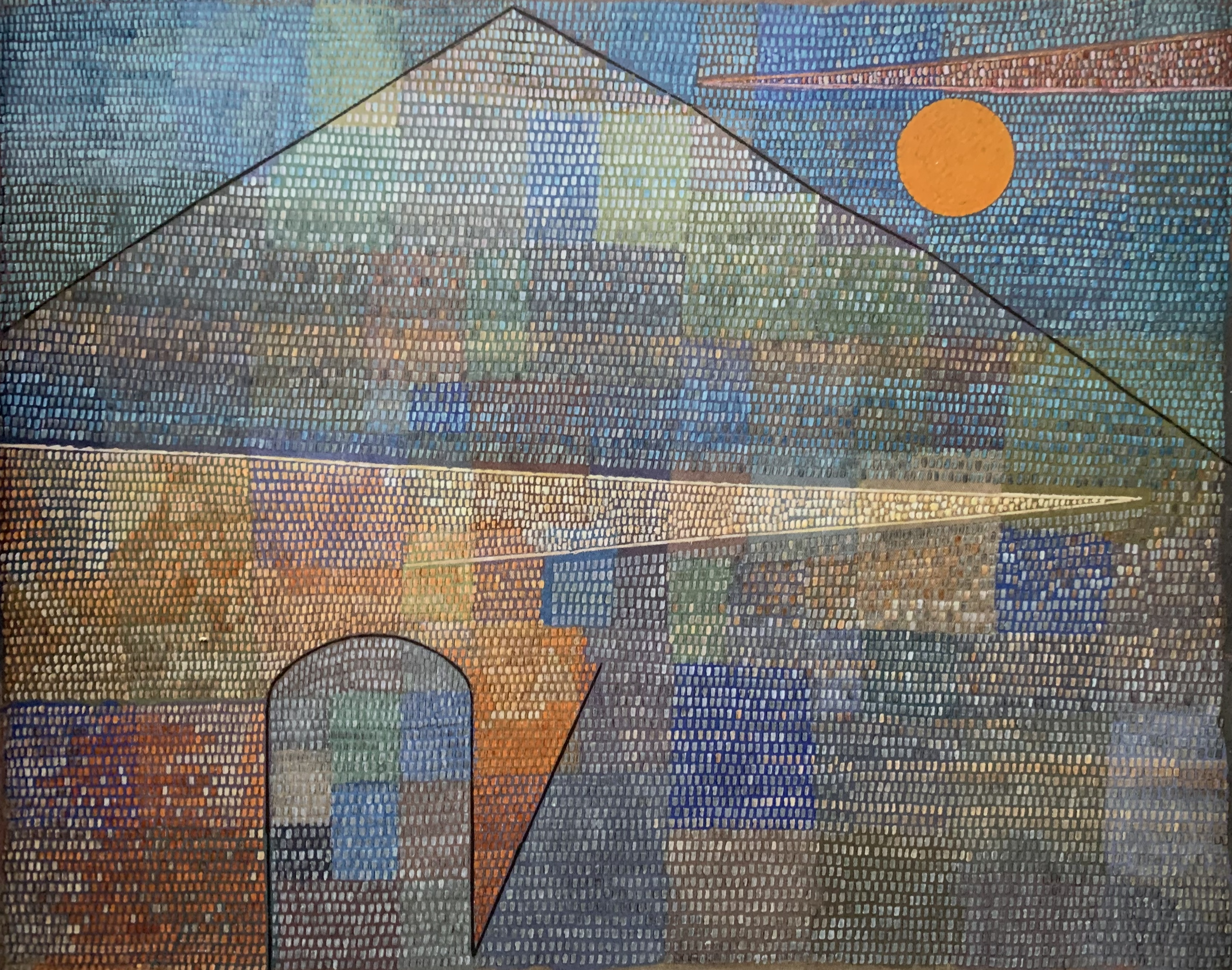
- Artist: Paul Klee
- Year: 1932
- Medium: oil on canvas
- Dimensions: 100 cm × 126 cm (39 in × 50 in)
- Location: Kunstmuseum Bern, Bern

Ad Parnassum is a pointillist painting by Swiss-born artist Paul Klee. The painting is currently in the Kunstmuseum Bern.

== Analysis ==
It was created while Klee was teaching at the Dusseldorf Academy following his trip to Egypt three years prior. The painting process consisted of first applying large squares of muted color on unprimed canvas. Klee then stamped on smaller squares, first in white and then in other diluted colors. The composition is dominated by the shape of a pyramid outlined with stamped lines. The structure could also be interpreted as the roof of a house or a mountain and was likely inspired by the Egyptian pyramids, the Niesen that overlooks Lake Thun in the artist's home country, and the titular Mount Parnassus. Above the pyramid to the right is a bright orange circle that represents the Sun. Klee’s use of color and geometric shapes in this piece contributes to its enigmatic and thought-provoking quality.

Ad Parnassum was painted during a turning point in Klee's artistic style and is now considered a masterpiece in pointillism. An exhibition celebrating the work was presented at the Zentrum Paul Klee from June 2007 to May 2008.

== See also ==
- List of works by Paul Klee
