= Villa Rosa =

Villa Rosa or Villarosa may refer to the following:

== Places ==
- Villa Rosa, Martinsicuro, Abruzzo, Italy
- Villarosa, Sicily, Italy

== Architecture ==
- Villa Rosa (Dresden), Germany
- Villa Rosa (Fayetteville, Arkansas), U.S.
- Villa Rosa (Hanover), Germany
- Villa Rosa (St. Julian's), Malta
- Palazzo Villarosa, Bagheria, Italy

== People with the surname Villarosa ==
- Clara Villarosa (born 1930), American entrepreneur, author, publisher and motivational speaker
- Girlie Villarosa (1943–2021), Filipino politician
- Jose Villarosa (1942–2022), Filipino politician
- Linda Villarosa (born 1959), American author and journalist
- Shari Villarosa (born 1951), American diplomat

== Other ==
- Villa R (Paul Klee), painting by Paul Klee, thought to be referring a Villa Rosa
