= Architecture (disambiguation) =

Architecture is the science and formerly the art of designing and constructing buildings and other structure for human use and shelter.

Architecture may also refer to:

== Design of built environments ==
- Landscape architecture, the design of man-made land constructs
- Naval architecture, the science of design of water-borne vessels
- Vehicle architecture, an automobile platform common to different vehicles
- Architectural Technology, the application of technology to the design of buildings

== Design of process systems ==
- Process architecture, the design of general process systems (computers, business processes, etc.)
  - Enterprise architecture, an architecture, or framework, for aligning an organization's systems
    - Enterprise information security architecture, or EISA, the portion of enterprise architecture focused on information security
  - Information architecture, the systems architecture for structuring the information flows in a knowledge-based system
  - Robotic architectures, the architecture of the hardware and software in robots
  - Systems architecture, the representation of an engineered system
  - Technical architecture, the technical definition of an engineered system

=== Computing ===
- Computer architecture, the systems architecture of a computer
  - Hardware architecture, the architecture design of an integrated device
    - Microarchitecture, processor implementation
  - Software architecture, the systems architecture of a software system

== Publications ==
- Architecture: the AIA journal, published by the American Institute of Architects, 1983–2006
- Architecture (magazine, 1900–1936)

== Art and media ==
- Architecture (Klee), a 1923 painting by Paul Klee
- "Architecture", a song by Maisie Peters from Dressed Too Nice for a Jacket, 2018

== Biology ==
- Histopathologic architecture, the overall pattern formed by groups of cells
- Cytoarchitecture, the arrangement and interaction of cellular structures in the central nervous system
- Nuclear architecture, the arrangement and organization of chromatin inside the nucleus

== Record labels ==
- Architecture Label, an Australian record label

== Other uses ==
Architecture sometimes refers to:

- "Architecture", a song by Jonathan Thulin from The White Room, 2012
- "Architecture", a song by Maisie Peters from Dressed Too Nice For a Jacket, 2018
- Architectural history, studies the evolution and history of architecture
- Architectural analytics
- Product design, or product architecture, the systems design of a product or product family
- Architectural Association School of Architecture, a private school of architecture

== See also ==
- Temple architecture
