= Ab ovo (painting) =

Painting by Paul Klee

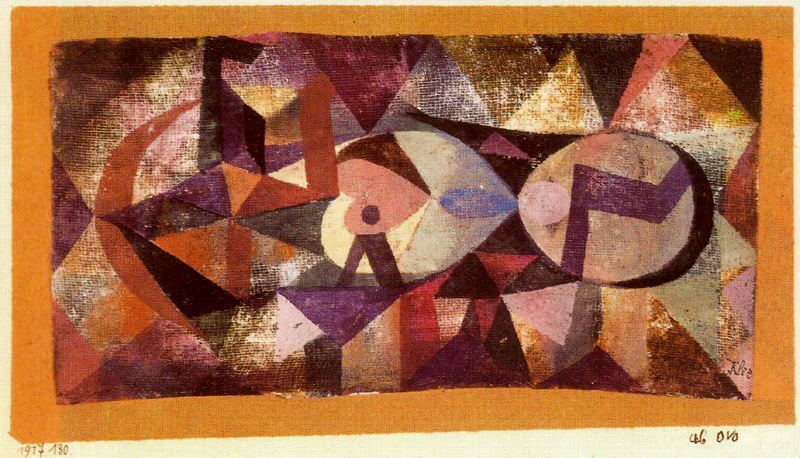
- Artist: Paul Klee
- Year: 1917
- Type: watercolor on gauze and paper with a chalk ground
- Dimensions: 14.9 cm × 26.6 cm (5.9 in × 10.5 in)
- Location: Zentrum Paul Klee; Bern

Ab ovo (From the egg) is a 1917 painting by Paul Klee (1879–1940) made during his time in the German Army. It is noteworthy for its sophisticated technique. It employs watercolor on gauze and paper with a chalk ground, which produces a rich texture of triangular, circular, and crescent patterns.

The work is in the collection of the Zentrum Paul Klee in Bern, Switzerland.

== See also ==
- List of works by Paul Klee
