= Magic mirror =

Magic mirror or The Magic Mirror may refer to:

== Art ==
- Magic Mirror (M. C. Escher), a 1946 lithograph by M. C. Escher Escher
- In the Magic Mirror, a 1934 painting by Paul Klee

== Literature ==
- Magic Mirror (book), a 1999 book by Orson Scott Card
- Magic Mirror (Snow White), a fictional mirror in the fairy tale "Snow White"
- "The Magic Mirror" (fairy tale), a Rhodesian fairy tale in Andrew and Leonora Lang's The Orange Fairy Book
- The Magic Mirror, a 1989 book by Sylvia Plath

== Other uses ==
- Magic Mirror (album), a 2021 album by Pearl Charles
- Magic Mirror (film), a 2005 Portuguese film
- The Magic Mirror (ballet), a 1903 ballet by Marius Petipa
- Chinese magic mirror, a Chinese bronze mirror
- Disney's Magical Mirror Starring Mickey Mouse, a 2002 video game

== See also ==
- Catoptromancy, divination using a mirror
- Infinity mirror, parallel or angled mirrors reflecting each other
