= Paul Klee Notebooks =

Two-volume work by Paul Klee

Writings on form and design theory (Paul Klee Notebooks)
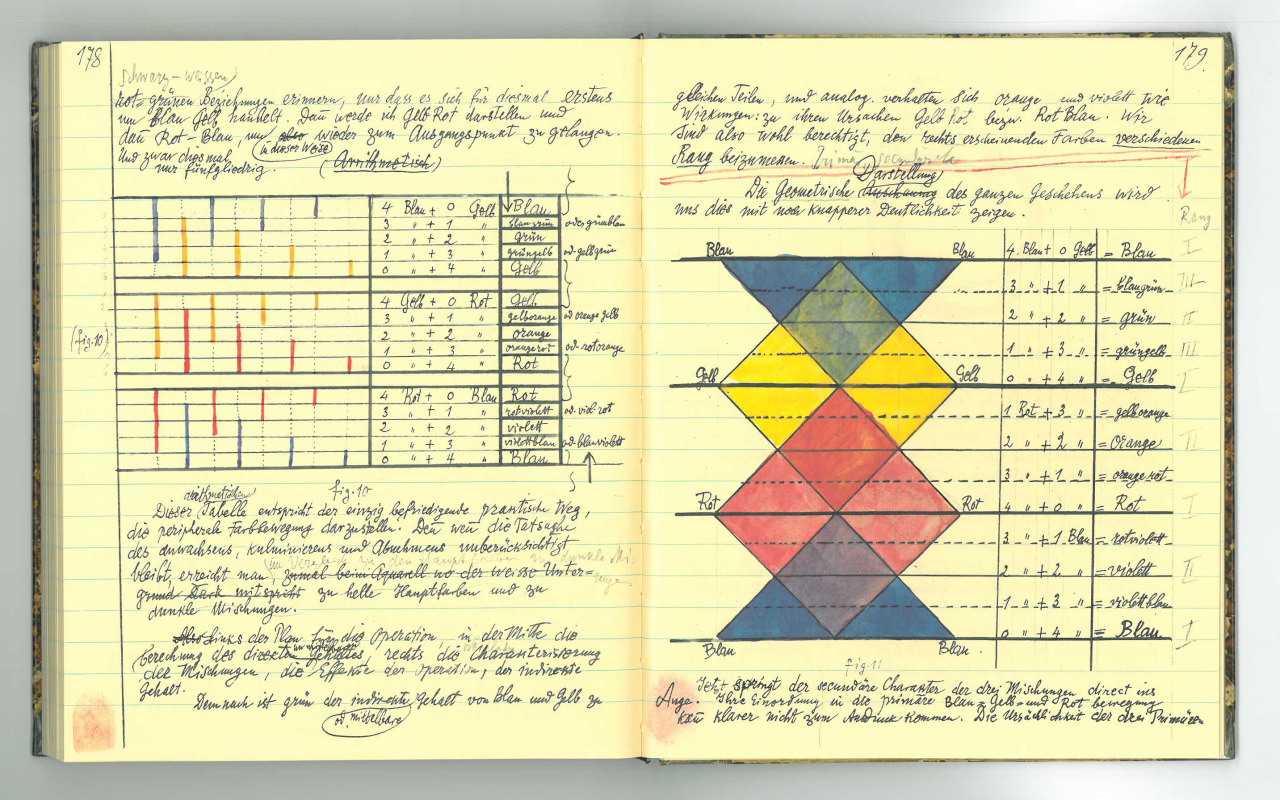
- Pages from Klee's notebooks discussing colour
- Author: Paul Klee
- Original title: Schriften zur Form und Gestaltungslehre
- Language: German
- Subject: Klee's Bauhaus school lectures
- Genre: Modern art
- Published: 1956 & 1964
- Publisher: Benno Schwab
- Publication place: Germany
- Website: Zentrum Paul Klee online edition

Paul Klee Notebooks is a two-volume work by the Swiss-born artist Paul Klee that collects his lectures at the Bauhaus schools in 1920s Germany and his other main essays on modern art. These works are considered so important for understanding modern art that they are compared to the importance that Leonardo's A Treatise on Painting had for Renaissance art. Herbert Read called the collection "the most complete presentation of the principles of design ever made by a modern artist – it constitutes the Principia Aesthetica of a new era of art, in which Klee occupies a position comparable to Newton's in the realm of physics."

The final work was edited by Swiss artist Jürg Spiller and Marcel Franciscono criticized Spiller's collection of Klee's notes as "extensive but drastically rearranged", and added that the lectures "are interspersed with later notes and in part rearranged. Despite Spiller's notation of their sources in Klee's manuscripts, it is not always possible to determine from his arrangement where a lecture leaves off and an interpolation begins."

In an earlier 1925 shorter book, Pädagogisches Skizzenbuch ('Pedagogical Sketchbook'), Klee published a condensation of his lectures at the Weimar Bauhaus.

== Contents ==
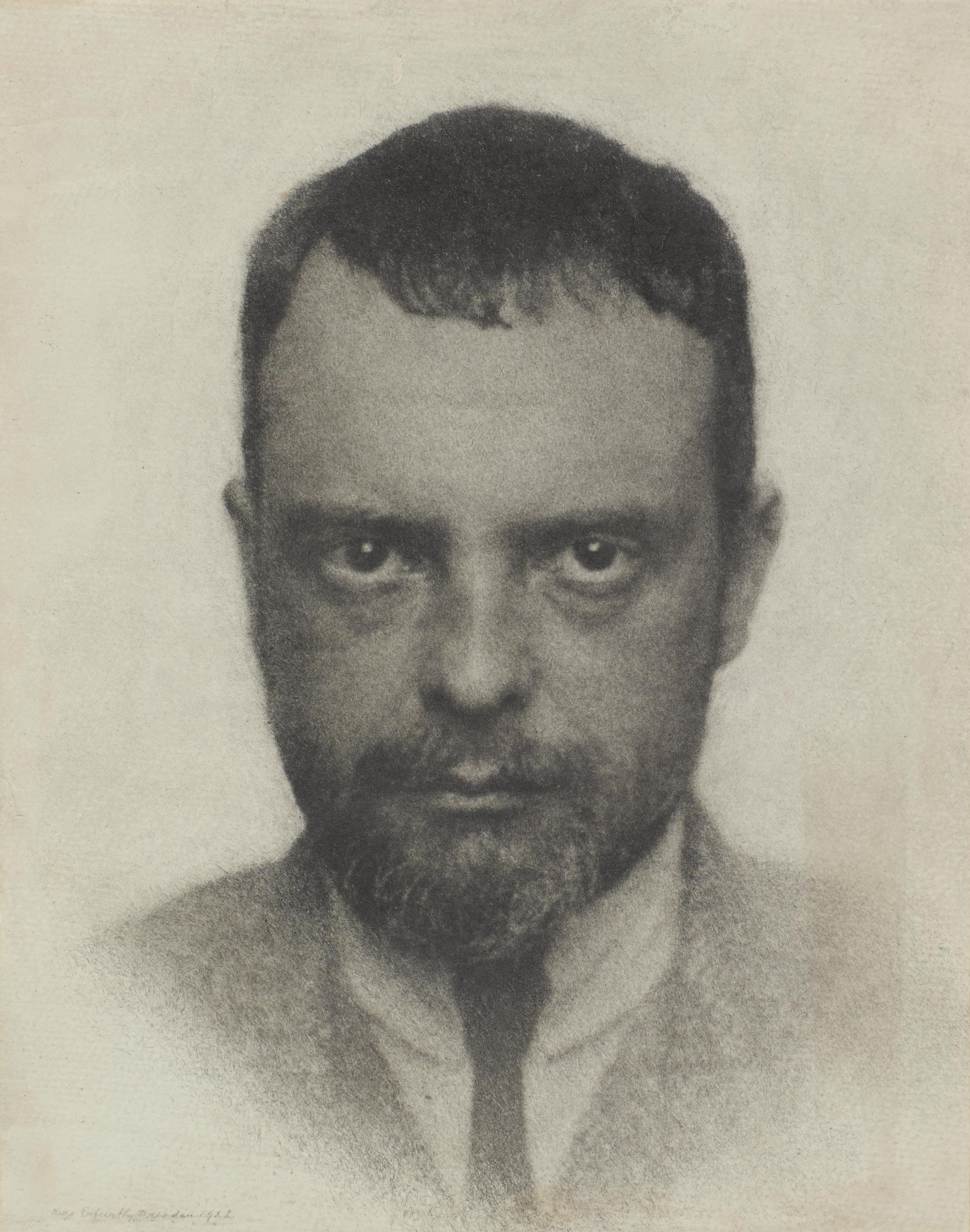
Author Paul Klee

=== Volume I - Essays ===
- 1923 Wege des Naturstudiums ('Ways of Studying Nature')
- 1924 Über moderne Kunst ('On Modern Art'), lecture held at Paul Klee's exhibition at the Kunstverein in Jena on 26 January 1924

=== Volume I - Lectures ===
- 1922 Beiträge zur bildnerischen Formlehre ('Contributions to a pictorial theory of form', part of his 1921-2 lectures at the Bauhaus)

== Translations ==
The original title is Schriften zur Form und Gestaltungslehre ('Writings on form and design theory'), and the two volumes are titled Band I: Das bildnerische Denken ('Volume I: the creative thinking') and Band 2: Unendliche Naturgeschichte ('Volume 2: Infinite Natural History'); they were edited by Jürg Spiller and first published in Switzerland (Basel) and Germany (Stuttgart) by publishing house Benno Schwab, in 1956 and 1964 respectively.

The subtitles of the two volumes were rendered, for the English translation, 'The thinking eye' and 'The Nature of Nature'. The Italian translation is called Teoria della forma e della figurazione, and the two volumes are subtitled Il pensiero immaginabile and Storia naturale infinita. The French edition is called Contributions à la théorie de la forme picturale.

== Online edition ==
In 2016, the Zentrum Paul Klee museum in Bern, Switzerland, published digital versions of Klee's notebooks on their website.

== See also ==
- List of works by Paul Klee
