= Senecio (Klee) =

Painting by Paul Klee

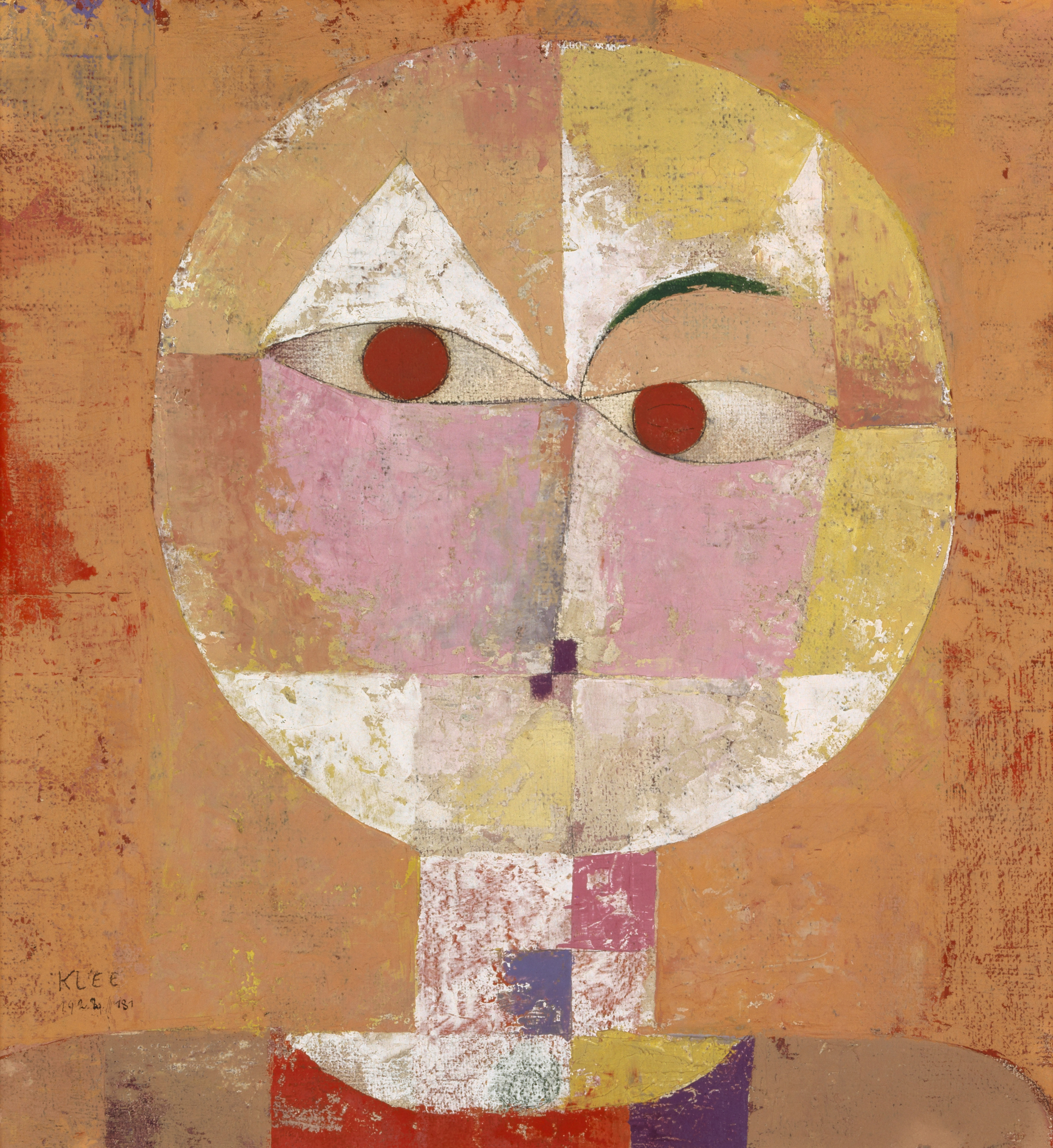
- Artist: Paul Klee
- Year: 1922
- Medium: oil on canvas mounted on panel
- Dimensions: 40.5 cm × 38 cm (15.9 in × 15 in)
- Location: Kunstmuseum Basel, Basel

Senecio or Head of a Man Going Senile is an oil on canvas mounted on panel Cubist painting by Swiss artist Paul Klee, from 1922. It is held in the Kunstmuseum Basel.

== Analysis ==
Klee's adaptation of the human head divides an elderly face into rectangles of orange, pink, yellow, and white. The flat geometric squares within the circle resemble a mask or the patches of a harlequin, hence the title's reference to the artist-performer Senecio. The triangle and curved line above the left and right eyes respectively give the illusion of a raised eyebrow.

The painting's use of lines, ambiguous shapes, and space all demonstrate the principles of Klee's artistry in which simple graphical elements are "set in motion by energy from the artist's mind."

== See also ==
- List of works by Paul Klee
