= Temple architecture =

Temple architecture may refer to:

- Bengal temple architecture
- Hindu temple architecture
- Temple architecture (LDS Church)

== Architecture ==
- Pancharatna (architecture) is a style of Bengal temple architecture.
- Panchayatana (temple) is a style of Hindu temple architecture.
- Navaratna (architecture), an Indian architectural style

== See also ==
- Architecture (disambiguation)
