= Cat and Bird =

Painting by Paul Klee

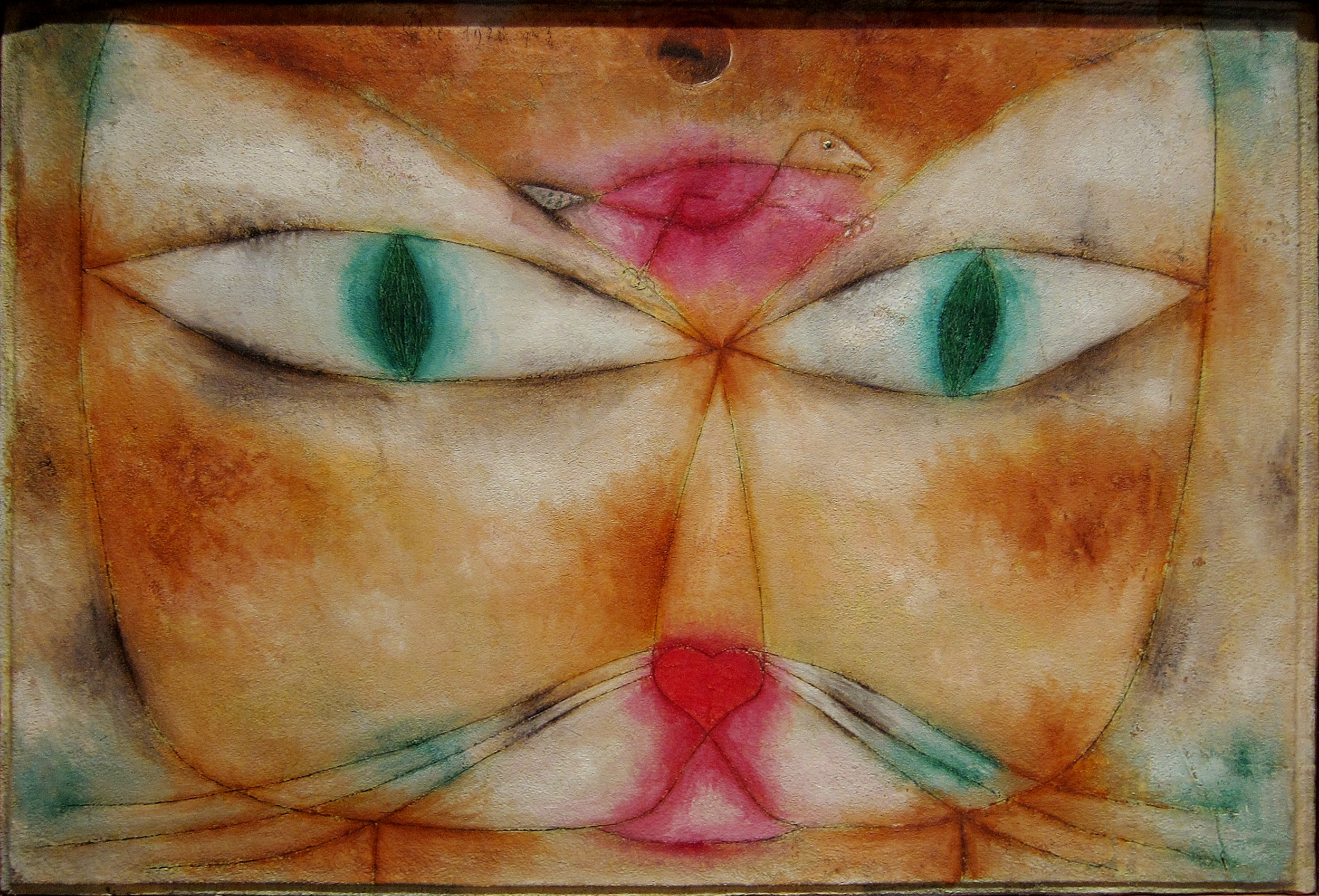
- Artist: Paul Klee
- Year: 1928
- Type: Oil and ink on plaster-primed gauze mounted on plywood
- Dimensions: 38.1 cm × 53.2 cm (15.0 in × 20.9 in)
- Location: Museum of Modern Art; New York

Cat and Bird is a painting by Swiss German painter Paul Klee, created in 1928. It was made when Klee was a teacher at the Bauhaus Dessau. The painting depicts the wide face of a stylized cat with a small bird perched on its forehead. It is held in the Museum of Modern Art, in New York.

== History and description ==
Klee made many paintings and drawings depicting cats, the most well-known being the current. The little bird on the forehead of the cat is actually meant to be inside the cat's head; it can be assumed that he is dreaming of a potential prey. In the painting, the bird only plays a minor role; the undisputed main character is the cat, whose face overwhelmingly dominates the format. Domestic cats often like to sit in tight spaces. His facial expression is characterized by a frightening alertness, shown in the open eyes with the typical vertical pupils of the cats, but also by his calmness. Klee's coloring is muted in this painting, from pink to light brown, as well as bluish, green and violet areas, a warm color scheme that corresponds to the nature of warmth-loving domestic cats. Only the tip of the nose appears in bright red, in the shape of a heart. As a well-known symbol, this heart is supposed to express a kind of “loving desire”. Klee liked cats and also kept them at home and in his studio. Above the bird is a kind of dark celestial body at the top of the picture, a motif that appears frequently in his paintings. The painter viewed the world as the model of a cosmic planetarium designed to show spiritual truths.

The painter wanted to let simple lines, shapes and colors work for themselves in his paintings. He called this "the pure cultivation of means". The visible should recede and focus instead on thought, imagination and the "hunger of the mind". He wanted to “make hidden visions visible”. For the two beings in this painting, he used simple strokes and lines in the drawing, reminiscent of children's drawings, which he saw as "sources of creativity". So simple pointed oval shapes for the eyes, triangles for the nose, ears and cat's mouth are characteristic of this painting. The bird shows a similar wavy reduced line in the drawing to the eye area of the cat and is reminiscent of Klee's depictions of the graphic meaning of the active, medial and passive lines in their curved form.

The cat is represented as a kind of "magical eye animal", since the bird is literally imprinted on him, as an eternal wish. Both animals belong to the painters creatures of his knowledge, imagination for forms and his suggestive simplified sign language, which he experienced and developed after a trip to Tunis, in 1914, and later as a Bauhaus teacher.

The American art historian William Rubin interprets Cat and Bird from the perspective of Gestalt psychology and mentions the small formats of Klee's paintings. Things can only happen in the head with small formats, and here it is the cat that thinks of the bird and who no longer wants him to "get out of his head". With this painting, Klee speculates perhaps on the unconscious knowledge of the viewer, who otherwise would not understand that the bird is not outside the cat, but only in his obsessed mind. Rubin believes that this painting is rather unique in Klee's work in terms of execution and subject.

== Provenance ==
Klee donated the painting to Alfred Flechtheim's gallery in Berlin in 1929, and it was loaned to the Museum of Modern Art, in New York, in 1930. In 1934 it was sold to Franz Herbert Hirschland. After his death, it passed through inheritance to Susan Ann Hirschland and Joan Ellen Hirschland Meijer. In 1975 it came as an offer to the Museum of Modern Art, in New York, where it has been since then.

== See also ==
- List of works by Paul Klee
