= Twittering Machine =

Painting by Paul Klee

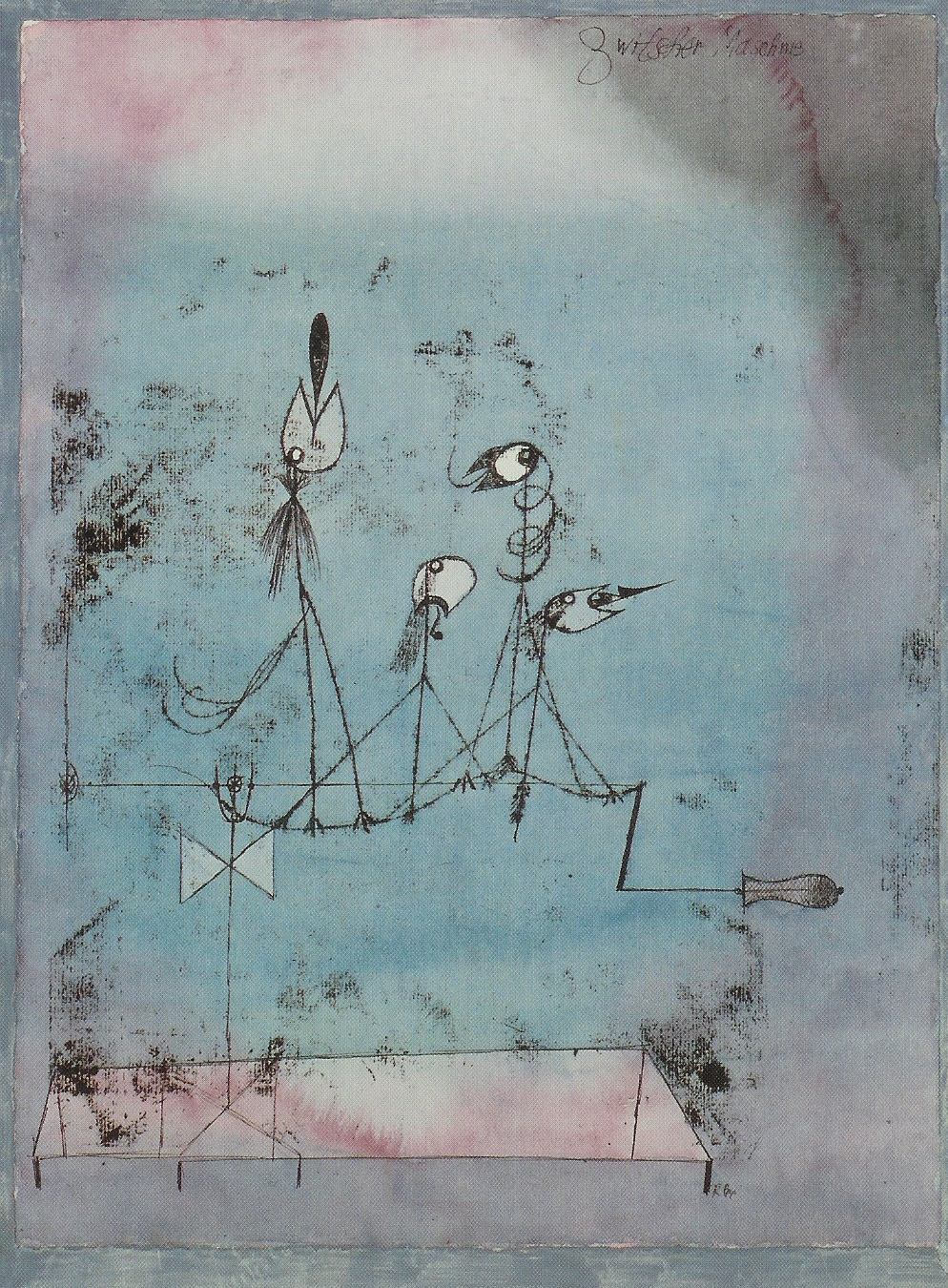
- Artist: Paul Klee
- Year: 1922
- Catalogue: 37347
- Type: Watercolor and ink; oil transfer on paper with gouache and ink on borders
- Dimensions: 63.8 cm × 48.1 cm (25.1 in × 18.9 in)
- Location: Museum of Modern Art, New York
- Accession: 564.1939

Twittering Machine (Die Zwitscher-Maschine) is a 1922 watercolor with gouache, pen-and-ink, and oil transfer on paper by Swiss-German painter Paul Klee. Like other artworks by Klee, it blends biology and machinery, depicting a loosely sketched group of birds on a wire or branch connected to a hand-crank. Interpretations of the work vary widely: it has been perceived as a nightmarish lure for the viewer or a depiction of the helplessness of the artist, but also as a triumph of nature over mechanical pursuits. It has been seen as a visual representation of the mechanics of sound.

Originally displayed in Germany, the image was declared "degenerate art" by Adolf Hitler in 1933 and sold by the Nazi Party to an art dealer in 1939, whence it made its way to New York. One of the better known of more than 9,000 works produced by Klee, it is among the more famous images of the New York Museum of Modern Art (MoMA). It has inspired several musical compositions and, according to a 1987 magazine profile in New York, has been a popular piece to hang in children's bedrooms.

== Description ==
The picture depicts a group of birds, largely line drawings; all save the first are shackled on a wire or, according to The Washington Post, a "sine-wave branch" over a blue and purple background which the MoMA equates with the "misty cool blue of night giving way to the pink flow of dawn". Each of the birds is open-beaked, with a jagged or rounded shape emerging from its mouth, widely interpreted as its protruding tongue. The end of the perch dips into a crank.

== Critical analysis ==
Twittering Machine has invited very different opinions on its meaning, which Gardner's Art Through the Ages (2009) suggests is characteristic of Klee's work: "Perhaps no other artist of the 20th century matched Klee's subtlety as he deftly created a world of ambiguity and understatement that draws each viewer into finding a unique interpretation of the work." The image has frequently been perceived as whimsical, with a 1941 article in the Hartford Courant describing it as "characterized by the exquisite absurdity of Lewis Carroll's "Twas brillig and the slithy toves" and The Riverside Dictionary of Biography placing it in "a very personal world of free fancy".

Sometimes, the image is perceived as quite dark. MoMA suggests that, while evocative of an "abbreviated pastoral", the painting inspires "an uneasy sensation of looming menace" as the birds themselves "appear closer to deformations of nature". They speculate that the "twittering machine" may in fact be a music box that produces a "fiendish cacophony" as it "lure[s] victims to the pit over which the machine hovers". Kay Larson of New York magazine (1987), too, found menace in the image, which she describes as "a fierce parable of the artist's life among the philistines": "Like Charles Chaplin caught in the gears of Modern Times, they [the birds] whir helplessly, their heads flopping in exhaustion and pathos. One bird's tongue flies up out of its beak, an exclamation point punctuating its grim fate—to chirp under compulsion."

Without drawing conclusions on emotional impact, Werckmeister, in the 1989 book The Making of Paul Klee's Career, sees a deliberate blending of birds and machine, suggesting the piece is part of Klee's general interest in "the formal equation between animal and machine, between organism and mechanism" (similar to the ambiguity between bird and airplane in a number of works). According to Wheye and Kennedy (2008), the painting is often interpreted as "a contemptuous satire of laboratory science".

Arthur Danto, who does not see the birds as deformed mechanical creatures but instead as separate living elements, speculates in Encounters & Reflections (1997) that "Klee is making some kind of point about the futility of machines, almost humanizing machines into things from which nothing great is to be hoped or feared, and the futility in this case is underscored by the silly project of bringing forth by mechanical means what nature in any case provides in abundance." Danto believes that perhaps this machine has been abandoned, the birds opportunistically using it as a perch from which they issue the sounds the inert machine is failing to produce. Danto also suggests, conversely, that the painting may mean simply that "it might not be a bad thing if we bent our gifts to the artificial generation of bird songs."

Wheye and Kennedy suggest that the picture may represent a sound spectrograph, with the heads of the birds perhaps representing musical notes and the size, shape and direction of their tongues suggesting the "volume, intensity, degree of trilling, and degree of shrillness of their voices". This reflects the earlier view of Soby's Contemporary Painters (1948) that:

The bird with an exclamation point in its mouth represents the twitter's full volume; the one with an arrow in its beak symbolizes an accompanying shrillness – a horizontal thrust of piercing song. Since a characteristic of chirping birds is that their racket resumes as soon as it seems to be ending, the bird in the center droops with lolling tongue, while another begins to falter in song; both birds will come up again full blast as soon as the machine's crank is turned.

== History ==
The Swiss-born Klee had been teaching at the Bauhaus school in Germany for a year when he completed this ink and watercolor drawing in 1922. The work was displayed for several years in the Alte Nationalgalerie in Berlin until Adolf Hitler declared it and many other works by the Swiss-born Klee "degenerate art" in 1933. The Nazis seized the painting and sold it in 1939 for $120 to an art dealer in Berlin. The New York MoMA purchased the painting that same year.

Although Klee produced more than 9,000 works in his lifetime, Twittering Machine has become one of his better known images. According to Danto, the painting is "one of the best-known treasures at the Museum of Modern Art".

== Legacy ==
External videos
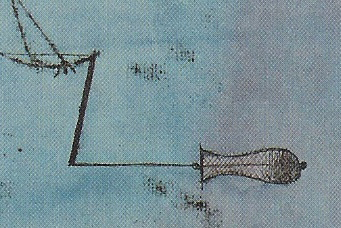
- Klee's Twittering Machine, Smarthistory

The son of a musicologist, Klee himself drew parallels between sound and art, and Twittering Machine has been influential on several composers. In fact, as of 2018, Klee's painting has inspired more musical compositions than any other single piece of art, with more than 100 examples, from full symphony orchestra to solo piano. The first such work is the 1951 orchestral work Die Zwitschermaschine by German composer Giselher Klebe; probably its two most famous appearances are as movement four in David Diamond's 1957 four-movement "The World of Paul Klee" and as the fourth movement of Gunther Schuller's "Seven Studies on Themes of Paul Klee", composed in 1959. According to Time magazine, the two composers drew very different interpretations from the piece, with Schuller's work consisting of a "snatch of serial music in which the orchestra beeped, squeaked and rasped like a rusty hinge while the muted brasses burped out shreds of sound" while Diamond drew on "more somber tones: muted, dark-hued movements of the strings, with the picture's more jagged lines delineated by scampering woodwinds and brasses."

Kay Larson wrote in New York Magazine (1987) that the image was then "embedded in childhood prehistory", commenting that it "always seemed to be taped to kids' bedroom walls, next to Rousseau's The Sleeping Gypsy".

== See also ==
- List of works by Paul Klee
- The Zwitscher-Maschine. Journal on Paul Klee is a publication dedicated to international studies on Paul Klee. It encompasses art historical and art technological studies, as well as literary or philosophical texts on the life and work of Paul Klee. The journal is freely accessible to authors from the international Klee research community, following an open-access approach known as the 'golden road' primary publishing strategy.
