= Angelus Novus =

Painting by Paul Klee

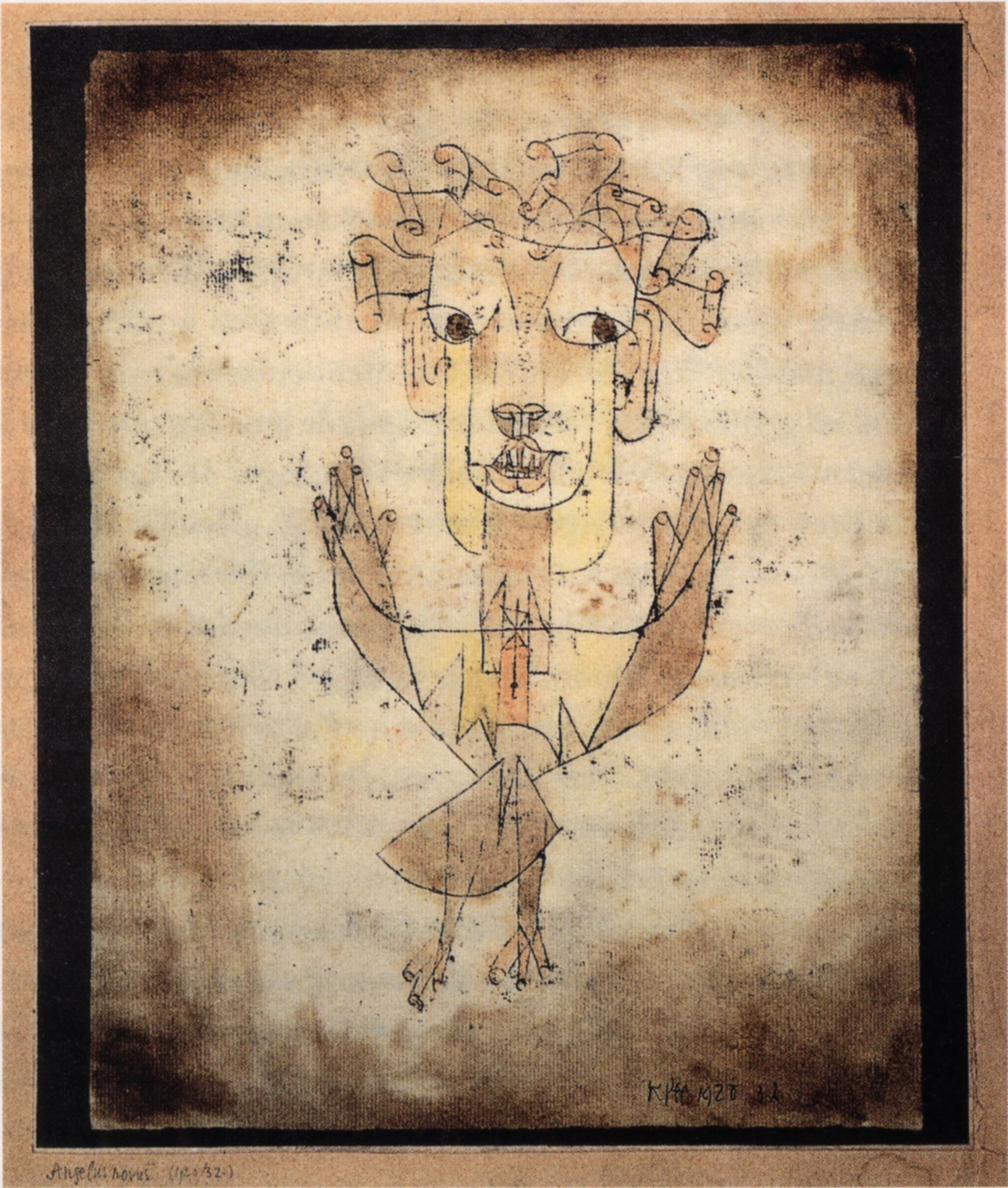
- Artist: Paul Klee
- Year: 1920
- Type: monoprint
- Dimensions: 31.8 cm × 24.2 cm (12.5 in × 9.5 in)
- Location: Israel Museum, Jerusalem

Angelus Novus (New Angel) is a 1920 monoprint by the Swiss-German artist Paul Klee, created using the oil transfer method he invented. It is now in the collection of the Israel Museum in Jerusalem.

== History ==
Walter Benjamin, a noted German critic and philosopher, purchased the print in 1921. When he had to flee Germany in 1933, he took it with him into exile in Paris. Before he tried to flee further when the Nazis invaded France, Benjamin entrusted the work, together with other important papers, to Georges Bataille, who hid it at the Bibliothèque nationale de France in Paris where he worked. Benjamin committed suicide in September 1940 in Spain, the night before he was due to be deported back to France. After World War II, Bataille gave the print to Theodor W. Adorno in Frankfurt, who per Benjamin's last will, sent it on to Benjamin's lifelong friend Gershom Scholem, a scholar of Jewish mysticism who had emigrated from Germany to Mandatory Palestine in 1923.

According to Scholem, Benjamin felt a mystical identification with the Angelus Novus and incorporated it into his theory of the “angel of history,” a melancholy view of the historical process as an unceasing cycle of despair. In his 1940 essay "Theses on the Philosophy of History", Benjamin describes Angelus Novus as an image of the "angel of history":

A Klee painting named Angelus Novus shows an angel looking as though he is about to move away from something he is fixedly contemplating. His eyes are staring, his mouth is open, his wings are spread. This is how one pictures the angel of history. His face is turned toward the past. Where we perceive a chain of events, he sees one single catastrophe which keeps piling wreckage upon wreckage and hurls it in front of his feet. The angel would like to stay, awaken the dead, and make whole what has been smashed. But a storm is blowing from Paradise; it has got caught in his wings with such violence that the angel can no longer close them. The storm irresistibly propels him into the future to which his back is turned, while the pile of debris before him grows skyward. This storm is what we call progress.

Some scholars suggest that the artist’s interest in Kabbalistic thought and Jewish mysticism may have influenced the spiritual themes in this artwork.

In 2015, in conjunction with her solo exhibition at the Tel Aviv Museum of Art, American artist R. H. Quaytman discovered that Klee had pasted the monoprint over an 1838 copperplate engraving by Friedrich Müller after a portrait of Martin Luther by Lucas Cranach.

In 2026, Angelus Novus was displayed in a Paul Klee exhibition at the Jewish Museum in Manhattan.

== Legacy ==
The name and concept of Klee's "New Angel" has inspired works by other artists, filmmakers, writers and musicians, including John Akomfrah, Ariella Azoulay, Amichai Chasson, Laurie Anderson, Rabih Alameddine, Daniel Boyd, Carolyn Forché, Haru Nemuri, Rosa Menkman and Ruth Ozeki.

In 1997, German art historian Otto Karl Werckmeister included the image among his selection of "icons of the left." He discussed Benjamin's use of the painting as an important contribution to its iconic status.

== See also ==
- List of works by Paul Klee
