= Highway and Byways =

1929 painting by Paul Klee

- Hauptweg und Nebenwege (German)
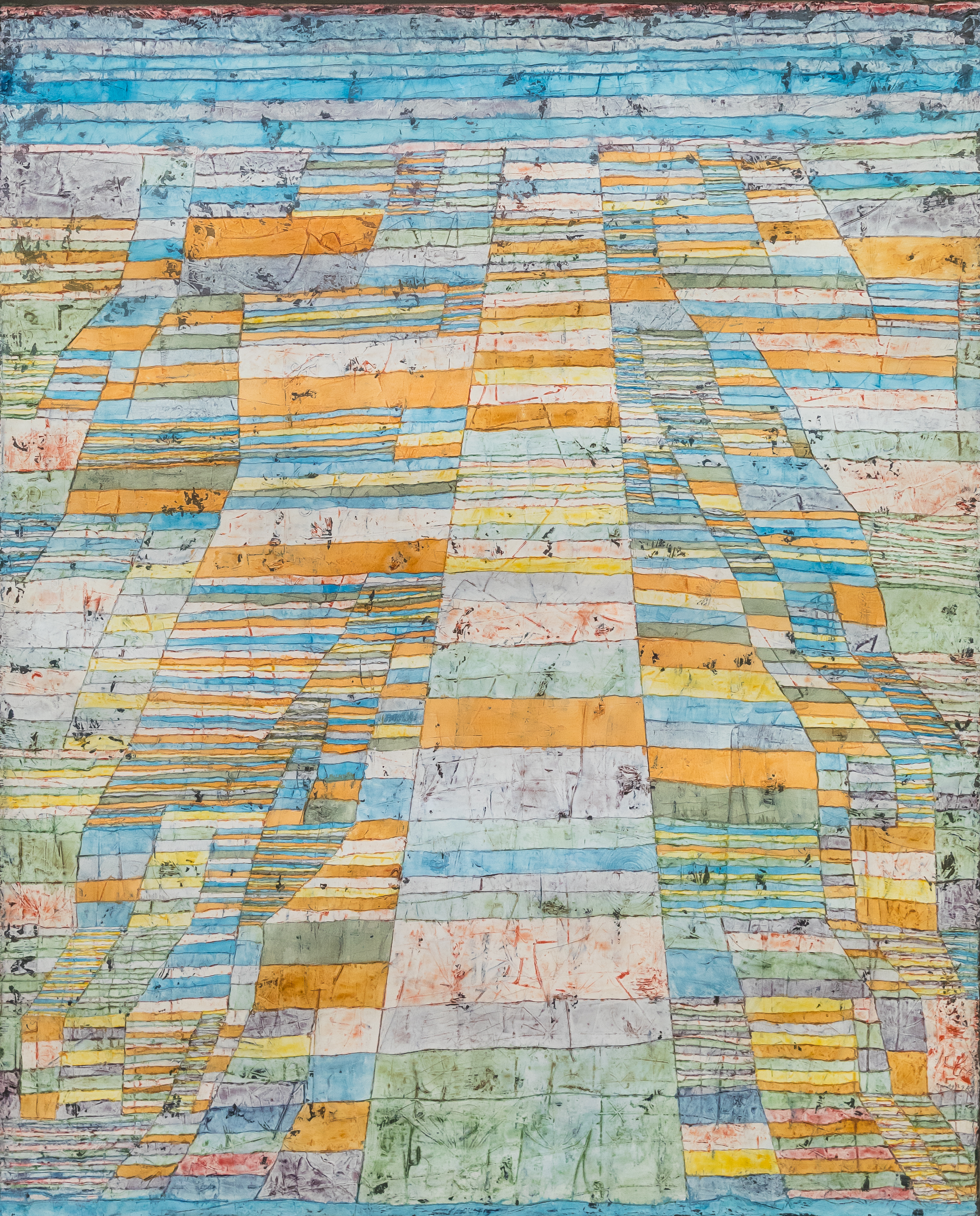
- Artist: Paul Klee
- Year: 1929
- Type: Oil on canvas
- Dimensions: 83.7 cm × 67.5 cm (33.0 in × 26.6 in)
- Location: Museum Ludwig; Cologne

Highway and Byways is an oil on canvas painting by German artist Paul Klee. It belongs to the group of his numerous layer and stripe paintings and was created in January 1929 after Klee's second trip to Egypt. On loan from Werner Vowinckel, it was first exhibited in the Wallraf-Richartz Museum in Cologne and can now be seen in the Museum Ludwig, also in Cologne.

== Description ==
The title of the painting correspond to its structure. In the middle, runs the straight, contoured main path, divided in several parts, differentiated by color contrasts, which moves mainly between blue-orange and red-green, almost aligned with the center of the painting and tapering in layers in its horizontal internal structure. The main path is not only a path, but also a “strip of fields that is divided 45 times across to the high zone of the streaky blue and purple” horizon, rather a “painting of the sky-bearing staircase of a step pyramid”. To the left and right of it, the small-scale side paths run much more irregularly, in twisted and disordered paths, which partly end in nothing, partly also end at the same blue-gray horizon, which also seems to give the main path its clear destination.

== Technique ==
In addition to the format and the programmatic title, the technique is also unusual: oil on a plaster-primed canvas stretched onto a stretcher, which Klee only used in few cases until 1929 and not very often later. Highway and Byways' is therefore unreservedly a key work of Klee.

For the composition of the painting, most of the line structure was scratched into a fresh plaster base, in the case of the two boundaries of the main path with a sharp stylus and with the help of a ruler, in almost all other cases with the free hand and a coarser instrument, which has left warps and ridges in the primer in some places.

== Critical evaluation ==
Horst Keller, director of the Wallraf-Richartz-Museum, called Highway and Byways an “indescribable magic picture”. It shows an immeasurable landscape, expressed with “the most sublime painting”, “which does not seem to have been conceived by a human being and not written down by a hand-held brush”.

== Influence ==
Inspired by the painting, the Swiss composer Christian Henking created his guitar solo Sillis in 1992. Thomas Blumenthal recorded it in 2002 on the album 8 Pieces on Paul Klee.

In 1998, the composer Michael Denhoff wrote an almost three-hour piano quintet, which, in conscious reference to Klee, bears the title Hauptweg und Nebenwege - Aufzüge, Op. 83. The work was premiered in 2000 at the International Beethoven Festival in Bonn by the Auryn Quartet and Birgitta Wollenweber, in piano.

== See also ==
- List of works by Paul Klee
