= Camel (in Rhythmic Landscape with Trees) =

Painting by Paul Klee

- Kamel in rhythmischer Baumlandschaft (German)
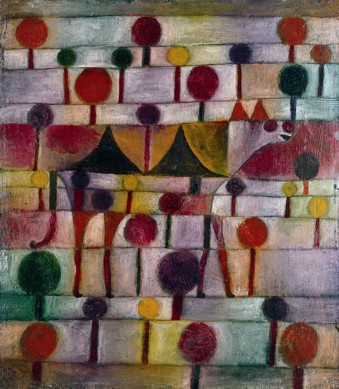
- Artist: Paul Klee
- Year: 1920
- Medium: Oil on canvas
- Dimensions: 48 cm × 42 cm (19 in × 17 in)
- Location: Kunstsammlung Nordrhein-Westfalen; Düsseldorf

Camel (in Rhythmic Landscape with Trees) (German: Kamel (in rhythmischer baumlandschaft)) is a painting by Swiss artist Paul Klee, made in 1920, in the collection of the Kunstsammlung Nordrhein-Westfalen in Düsseldorf, Germany.

The painting is one of the first Klee did in oils and is typical of the artist's interest in colour theory, draughtsmanship and musicality. It is also one of many images in Western art to use camels as subject matter.

The composition of the painting is based on horizontal bands dotted with circular shapes.

== Subject ==
Camels appear in manuscripts, mosaics, sculptures and paintings. For example, camels and horses appear in illustrations to the travel memoir of John Mandeville in the fourteenth century. Orientalist paintings of the nineteenth century include ones by artists such as Carl Haag (Danger in the Desert, 1867) and Jean-Léon Gérôme (Street Scene, Egypt, 1869). The memorial on the Victoria Embankment Gardens in London commemorates the Imperial Camel Corps in sculpture.

The year before, Klee had produced another camel painting in oils entitled Two Camels and a Donkey (1919). Camel in Rhythmic Landscape with Trees is considered one of a series that includes Rhythmic Tree Landscape. Similar landscapes, such as Small Rhythmic Landscape were also created at this time.

== Context and theory ==
"I would like now to examine the dimensions of the object in a new light to try to show how it is that the artist frequently arrives at what appears to be such an arbitrary 'deformation' of natural forms.

"First, he does not attach such intense importance to natural form as do so many realist critics, because, for him, these final forms are not the real stuff of the process of natural creation. For he places more value on the powers which do the forming than on the final forms themselves."
- Paul Klee

This is the period when the artist was working and teaching at the Bauhaus in Weimar under the direction of Walter Gropius. The task of teaching caused Klee to meditate on the problems of art and as a result he produced what Herbert Read called "the most profound and illuminating statement of the aesthetic basis of the modern movement in art ever made by a practising artist".

== See also ==
- List of works by Paul Klee
