= Fish Magic =

1925 painting by Paul Klee

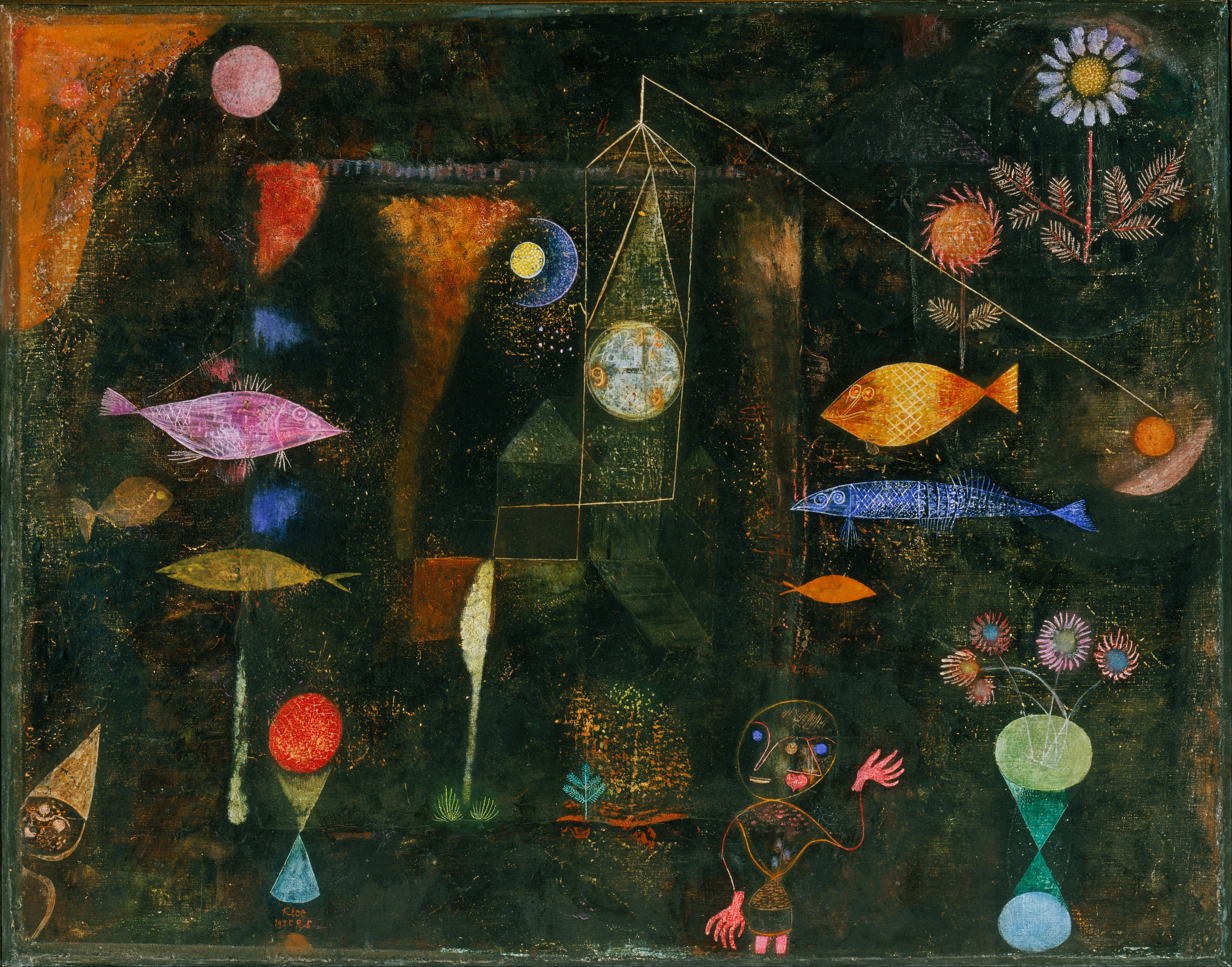
- Artist: Paul Klee
- Year: 1925
- Medium: oil and watercolor on canvas on panel
- Dimensions: 77.2 cm × 98.4 cm (30.4 in × 38.7 in)
- Location: Philadelphia Museum of Art, Philadelphia

Fish Magic is a 1925 Surrealist painting by Swiss-German artist Paul Klee. The painting belonged to the collection of Walter and Louise Arensberg before being donated in 1950 to the Philadelphia Museum of Art where it is currently held.

== Analysis ==
Fish Magic is seen as an intermingling of aquatic, celestial, and earthly entities. The painting is covered by a delicate surface of black paint, under which lies a dense layer of multicolored pigments. The colorful figures were then scratched and scrawled out by Klee on the dark background. A square of muslin was glued to the painting in the center, giving the painting the sense of a collage. The painting's dark palette and the muslin's fragility create a mysterious and inky atmosphere.

Ker writes that "Fish Magic is set squarely within the tradition of German Romanticism, with its blend of fantasy and natural empiricism, of poetry and pragmatics." She points to the technique used to draw out the various fish, flora, human beings, and clock tower as "a sophisticated version of the games children play with wax crayons."

According to Ann Temkin, Fish Magic is a masterpiece in which the intellectual and imaginative forces of Klee's artistic gifts are reconciled, producing a "sense of magic". Specifically, Temkin points to the thin diagonal line extending from the middle right of the canvas to the top of the clock tower, writing that the "long painted line from the side seems ready to pull the [square of muslin] off to reveal something underneath."

== See also ==
- List of works by Paul Klee
