= List of works by Paul Klee =

This is an incomplete list of works by Paul Klee (18 December 1879 – 29 June 1940), a Swiss-born German artist and draftsman. His highly individual style was influenced by movements in art that included Expressionism, Cubism, and Surrealism.

== Early Works (Pre 1914) ==
Image	Date Title	Size (cm)	Museum	Medium
	1912; View onto a Square	16.5 x 26.3	Thyssen-Bornemisza Museum, Madrid	Gouache, chalk and crayon on paper, on cardboard
	1912; Cacti	52 x 41.5	Lenbachhaus, Munich	Oil on cardboard
	1913; Young Woman in the Armchair	27 x 17.5	Sprengel Museum, Hanover	Watercolour and oil on paper, on cardboard
	1913; Interior with the Clock	23.8 x 21.9	National Gallery of Art, Washington D.C.	Watercolour on paper, on cardboard

== 1914-1919 ==
Image	Date Title	Size (cm)	Museum	Medium
	1914; Hammamet with its Mosque	23.8 x 22.2	Metropolitan Museum of Art, New York	Watercolor and graphite on paper mounted on cardboard
	1914; After a Sketch from Zurich	11.4 x 13.3	Barnes Foundation, Philadelphia	Watercolour on paper, on paperboard
	1914; Untitled	13.5 x 12.5	Sprengel Museum, Hanover	Watercolour and ink on paper, on cardboard
	1914; Garden in St. Germain, The European Quarter Near Tunis	27.9 x 33	Metropolitan Museum of Art, New York	Watercolour on paper on, cardboard
	1914; Untitled	15.6 x 15.6	Metropolitan Museum of Art, New York	Watercolour on paper, on cardboard
	1914; Open Mountain	23.1 x 18.9	Private collection	Watercolour and pen and India ink on paper
	1914 Missehe	10.5 × 15.4	Private Collection	Ink on paper
	1915; Landscape with Flags, Houses with Flags	23.3 x 28.3	Sprengel Museum, Hanover	Watercolour and oil on paper, on cardboard
	1915; Translucencies, Orange-Blue	18.7 x 23.2	Detroit Institute of Art	Watercolour on paper, on paperboard
	1915; Moonrise over St. Germain	18.4 x 17.2	Museum Folkwang, Essen	Watercolour and pencil on paper, on cardboard
	1915; Acrobats	22.5 x 27	Solomon R. Guggenheim Museum, New York	Watercolor, pastel and ink on paper
	1915; Composition with Figures	10.8 x 13	National Gallery of Art, Washington D.C.	Watercolour and ink on paper, on card
	1915; Untitled	13.5 x 10.2	Sprengel Museum, Hanover	Watercolour and pencil on paper, on cardboard
	1915; Woman Knitting	19 x 13.3	Boca Raton Museum of Art	Watercolour on paper
	1916; City of Towers	32.7 x 35.9	Philadelphia Museum of Art	Oil on canvas on panel
	1917; Die Kapelle	29.2 x 15.4	Foundation Beyeler, Riehen	Watercolour and tempera on paper, on cardboard
	1917; The Idea of Firs	25 x 16	Solomon R. Guggenheim Museum, New York	Watercolour and graphite on paper, on cardboard
	1917; Persian Nightingales	22.8 x 18.1	National Gallery of Art, Washington D.C.	gouache, watercolor, ink and graphite on paper, on cardboard
	1917; Ab ovo		Zentrum Paul Klee, Bern	Watercolour on gauze and paper
	1917; Above Mountain Summit	31 x 24.1	Kunstmuseum Den Haag	Gouache on paper
	1917; Municipal Jewel	16.8 × 26	Metropolitan Museum of Art, New York	Watercolor, gouache, and graphite on gesso on paper, on cardboard
	1917; Colorful Architecture	26 x 20	Metropolitan Museum of Art, New York	Gouache on paper on cardboard
	1918; Composition with the Yellow Half-Moon and the Y	22.2 x 16.8	Metropolitan Museum of Art, New York	Gouache and watercolor on gesso on fabric, on cardboard
	1918; Irma Rossa the Animal Tamer	29.5 x 23	Sprengel Museum, Hanover	Watercolour and ink on paper, on cardboard
	1918; Sunken Landscape	17.6 x 16.3	Museum Folkwang, Essen	Watercolour
	1918; Hafenbild	18 x 27.5	Pinakothek der Moderne, Munich	Mixed media on tissue on cardboard
	1918; Flower Myth	29 x 15.8	Sprengel Museum, Hanover	Watercolour on gauze, on newspaper
	1919; After Drawing 19/75	22.2 x 16	Zentrum Paul Klee, Bern	Watercolour
	1919; Composition with Stars	42.5 x 53.6	Kunstmuseum Den Haag	Gouache and oil on linen
	1919; Landscape with Bluebirds	21.6 x 28.3	Philadelphia Museum of Art	Watercolour on paper, on board
	1919; Villa R	26.5 x 22.4	Kunstmuseum Basel	Oil on cardboard
	1919; Sumpflegende	47 x 40.8	Lenbachhaus, Munich	Oil on cardboard
	1919; Tomcat's Turf	31.8 x 23.5	Metropolitan Museum of Art, New York	Watercolour, gouache and oil on gesso on fabric, on cardboard
	1919; Southern Gardens	28.9 x 22.5	Metropolitan Museum of Art, New York	Watercolor and ink on paper, on cardboard
	1919; Falling Bird	23.5 x 27	Metropolitan Museum of Art, New York	Watercolor, transferred printing ink, and ink on paper, on cardboard
	1919; Jumping Jack	28.4 x 22	Solomon R. Guggenheim Museum, New York	Watercolor, oil transfer drawing, and graphite on paper, mounted on paperboard
	1919; Death in the Garden (Legend)	27.3 x 24.8	Art Institute of Chicago	Oil on cotton, on cardboard nailed to wood
	1919; Full Moon	49.8 x 38	Pinakothek der Moderne, Munich	Oil on cardboard
	1919; Wald Bau	27.5 x 26	Museo del Novecento	Gesso on canvas

== 1920-1933 Bauhaus and Dusseldorf ==
Image	Date Title	Size (cm)	Museum	Medium
	1920; Before the Festivity	31.1 x 23.7	Solomon R. Guggenheim Museum	Watercolor and oil transfer drawing on paper, on cardboard
	1920; Rose Garden	49 x 42.5	Lenbachhaus, Munich	Oil, pen on paper, on cardboard
	1920; After 1915,29. Angel Serves the Desired	20.3 x 14.5	Several impressions	Lithograph on stained paper
	1920; Camel (in rhythmic landscape with trees)	48 x 42	Kunstsammlung Nordrhein-Westfalen, Düsseldorf	Oil on canvas
	1920; Angelus Novus	31.8 x 24.2	Israel Museum, Jerusalem	Oil transfer monoprint
	1920; The Lamb	31.3 x 40.9	Städel Museum, Frankfurt	Oil and pen and ink
	1920; Tree and Architecture - Rhythms	27.9 x 38.3	National Gallery of Art, Washington D.C.	Watercolour on paper
	1920; Tree and Architecture - Rhythms	27.9 x 38.3	National Gallery of Art, Washington D.C.	Oil on paper
	1920; White Blossom in the Garden	17.8 x 17.2	Solomon R. Guggenheim Museum, New York	Oil on paper
	1920; Bad Band	15.2 x 24.1	Barnes Foundation, Philadelphia	Watercolour, ink and crayon on paper, on paperboard
	1920; They're Biting	31.1 x 23.5	Tate Modern, London	Watercolour and oil on paper
	1920; Redgreen and Violet-Yellow Rhythms	37.5 × 33.7	Metropolitan Museum of Art, New York	Oil and ink on cardboard
	1920; Miraculous Landing, or the "112!"	31.1 x 38.1	Metropolitan Museum of Art, New York	Watercolour and ink on paper, on cardboard
	1920; Temple Gardens	18.4 x 26.7	Metropolitan Museum of Art, New York	Gouache on paper, on cardboard
	1920; Lovers	25.2 x 41.3	Metropolitan Museum of Art, New York	Gouache and graphite on paper, on cardboard
	1920; Theater-Mountain-Construction	47.9 x 62.9	Metropolitan Museum of Art, New York	Oil, gouache and ink on paper, on cardboard
	1920; Schoolhouse	36.8 x 31.8	Art Institute of Chicago	Oil on paper, on board
	1920; Landscape with Yellow Churchtower	48.2 x 54	Pinakothek der Moderne, Munich	Oil on cardboard
	1920; Arctic Dew	52 x 51 cm	Sezon Museum of Modern Art, Karuizawa	Oil on board
	1921 (From the Song of Songs) Version II	16.2 x 17.4	Solomon R. Guggenheim Museum, New York	Ink and watercolour on paper, on cardboard
	1921; Revolving House	37.7 x 52.2	Thyssen-Bornemisza Museum, Madrid	Oil and pencil on cotton cheesecloth, on paper
	1921; Fire Clown	21 x 17.5	National Gallery of Art, Washington D.C.	Watercolour on paper, on cardboard
	1921; Night Feast	36.9 x 49.8	Solomon R. Guggenheim Museum, New York	Oil on paper, on board
	1921; In the Spirit of Hoffmann	31.6 x 22.9	Several impressions	Lithograph
	1921; Comedy	30.5 x 45.4	Tate Modern, London	Watercolour and oil on paper
	1921; Goldfish Wife	35.2 x 51.4	Philadelphia Museum of Art	Watercolour on paper, on board
	1921; Tropische Dämmerung	33.5 x 23	Foundation Beyeler, Riehen	Oil on paper, on cardboard
	1921; The Pathos of Fertility	51.1 x 40.3	Several impressions	Watercolour and ink on paper, on verso of lithograph
	1921; Three House Pictures	19.4 x 42.9	Philadelphia Museum of Art	Oil and watercolour on paper, on board
	1921; All Souls' Picture	40 x 53.7	Metropolitan Museum of Art, New York	Watercolour and ink on paper, on cardboard
	1921; The Primeval Couple	31.2 x 48	Pinakothek der Moderne, Munich	Watercolour and oil on paper
	1921; Flower Family V	24.1 x 16.2	Solomon R. Guggenheim Museum, New York	Serigraph
	1921; Tropical Dawn with the Owl	27 x 30	Sprengel Museum, Hanover	Oil on cardboard
	1921; Saint of the Inner Light	38.9 x 23.5	Several impressions	Lithograph
	1921; Arrival of the Air Steamer	32.1 x 46	Detroit Institute of Arts	Oil transfer and watercolor on paper, on cardboard
	1921; Women's Pavilion	41.7 x 52.3 cm	Aichi Prefectural Museum of Art	Oil on board
	1922; Wallflower	28.9 x 34.9	Museum of Fine Arts, Boston	Watercolour and ink on paper
	1922; A Young Girl's Adventure	62.5 x 48	Tate Modern, London	Watercolour on paper
	1922; Fright of a Girl	29.7 x 22	Solomon R. Guggenheim Museum, New York	Watercolour and ink on paper
	1922; Senecio (Head of a Man)	40.3 x 37.4	Kunstmuseum Basel	Oil on canvas, on panel
	1922; The Twittering Machine	64.1 x 48.3	Museum of Modern Art, New York	Oil transfer watercolour and ink on paper
	1922; Red Balloon	31.7 x 31.1	Solomon R. Guggenheim Museum, New York	Oil on gauze, on board
	1922; Popular Wall Painting	47.6 x 28.9	Metropolitan Museum of Art, New York	Gouache and graphite on paper, on cardboard
	1922; Tower in Orange and Green	40 x 25.7	Metropolitan Museum of Art, New York	Watercolor, ink, and graphite on paper, on cardboard
	1922; Old Steamboat	23.4 x 24	National Gallery of Art, Washington D.C.	Watercolour and oil transfer on paper, on artist's mount
	1922; Mural from the Temple of Longing ↖Thither↗	30.2 x 39.4	Metropolitan Museum of Art	Watercolour and ink on fabric, on cardboard
	1922; Dance of the grieving child	33.7 x 23	Pinakothek der Moderne, Munich	Tempera on canvas
	1922; Monument in a Cemetery	30.9 x 42.4	Pinakothek der Moderne, Munich	Tempera and watercolour on cardboard
	1922; Growth of Night Plants	47.3 x 34	Pinakothek der Moderne, Munich	Oil on cardboard
	1922; Ghost of a Genius	50 x 35.4	Scottish National Gallery of Modern Art, Edinburgh	Oil transfer and watercolour on paper, on card
	1922; Red/Green Architecture (yellow/violet gradation)	37.9 x 42.0	Yale University Art Gallery, New Haven	Oil on canvas, on cardboard
	1922; Plants in the Moonlight	24.4 x 15.9	Detroit Institute of Arts	Ink, watercolor, and gouache on paper, on cardboard
	1922; Autumn Flower	38.1 x 30.9	Yale University Art Gallery	Oil on canvas
	1923; Open-Air Sport	22.9 x 25.4	Detroit Institute of Arts	Watercolour and ink on paper, on cardboard
	1923; Tropical Gardening	17.9 x 45.5	Solomon R. Guggenheim Museum, New York	Watercolour and oil transfer on paper, on cardboard
	1923; Diavolo Player	32.7 x 22.9	Philadelphia Museum of Art	Watercolour and oil transfer on paper, on board
	1923; Captive Pierrot	39.7 x 30.2	Detroit Institute of Arts	Oil transfer, watercolor, and ink on paper
	1923; Architecture	58 x 39	Alte Nationalgalerie, Berlin	
	1923; Vor dem Blitz	28 x 31.5	Foundation Beyeler, Riehen	Watercolour and pencil on paper, on card
	1923; The Man in Love	34.2 x 23.4	Several impressions	Lithograph
	1923; Landscape with Child	28.7 x 21.5	Museum of Grenoble	Oil on cardboard
	1923; The Barbed Noose with the Mice	31.1 x 40	Metropolitan Museum of Art, New York	Watercolor and gouache on paper, on cardboard
	1923; Postcard No. 4 for the 1923 Bauhaus Exhibition, Weimar	15.2 x 10.6	Several impressions	Lithograph
	1923; Episode before an Arab Town	25.4 x 32.7	Metropolitan Museum of Art, New York	Watercolour and ink on paper, on cardboard
	1923; Still Life with Dice	27 x 38	Thyssen-Bornemisza Museum, Madrid	Watercolour, chalk and ink on paper, on cardboard
	1923; Rotation	22.4 x 31.9	Sprengel Museum, Hanover	Oil, watercolour and pencil on paper
	1923; Christmas Picture	21.9 x 34.6	Philadelphia Museum of Art	Watercolour and ink on paper, on board
	1923; Abstract Trio	47.9 x 64.5	Metropolitan Museum of Art, New York	Watercolour and ink on paper, on cardboard
	1923; Static-Dynamic Gradation	43.5 x 29.2	Metropolitan Museum of Art, New York	Oil and gouache on paper, on cardboard
	1923; Ventriloquist and Crier in the Moor	41.9 x 29.5	Metropolitan Museum of Art, New York	Watercolour and ink on paper, on cardboard
	1923; Tightrope Walker	44 x 26.8	Several impressions	Lithograph
	1923; Tomb in Three Parts	33 x 45.1	Philadelphia Museum of Art	Watercolour and graphite on paper, on board
	1923; Castle Town (Feste Stadt)		Kunstsammlung Gera	
	1923; Strange Garden	53.3 x 39.4	Metropolitan Museum of Art, New York	Watercolour on fabric, on cardboard
	1923; Flowers in Pots	24.4 x 13.3	Philadelphia Museum of Art	Watercolour on paper, on board
	1923 to 1924; Garden on Debris	26.8 x 25.4	Art Institute of Chicago	Watercolour and ink on paper, on cardboard
	1924; River Construction Landscape	36 x 53.7	Staatliche Kunsthalle Karlsruhe	Oil on canvas
	1924; Structural II	25.7 x 21	Unknown	Gouache on paper
	1924; Signs in the Sky	19.7 x 28.6	Solomon R. Guggenheim Museum, New York	Oil on paper on cardboard
	1924; Sicilian Landscape	40 x 47.6	Barnes Foundation, Philadelphia	Gouache on paper, on paperboard
	1924; Jester	31.4 x 35.6	Detroit Institute of Arts	Watercolour, gouache and graphite on paper, on cardboard
	1924; Besessenes Mädchen	44.2 x 29.2	Foundation Beyeler, Riehen	Watercolour and oil transfer on paper, on cardboard
	1924; Curtain	18.1 x 9.2	Solomon R. Guggenheim Museum, New York	Watercolour on muslin, on paperboard
	1924; Actor's Mask	36.7 x 33.8	Museum of Modern Art, New York	Oil on canvas, on board
	1924; Green Plant-Blood-Louse	20.2 x 32.1	National Gallery of Art, Washington, D.C.	Watercolour and ink on cloth, on artist's mount
	1924; Astrological Fantasy Portrait	37.8 x 27.9	Metropolitan Museum of Art, New York	Gouache on paper, on cardboard
	1924; New House in the Suburbs	36.4 x 46.4	National Gallery of Art, Washington, D.C.	Gouache on canvas
	1924; Structural I	42.5 x 27	Metropolitan Museum of Art, New York	Gouache on cardboard
	1924; Asiatic God	56.5 x 35.6	Art Institute of Chicago	Oil and plaster, over gauze, on panel
	1924; Jörg	23.3 x 28.9	Philadelphia Museum of Art	Watercolour and ink on paper, on board
	1924; Still Life	21.8 x 28.6	Private collection	Oil on paper, on artist's mount
	1924; Bird Garden	27 x 39	Pinakothek der Moderne, Munich	Mixed media on newsprint, on cardboard
	1925; The Mask with the Flag	65 x 49.5	Pinakothek der Moderne, Munich	
	1925; Small Village in the Autumn Sun	37.8 x 54.5	Los Angeles County Museum of Art	Oil on cardboard on panel
	1925; Young Forest	9.8 x 32.2	National Gallery of Art, Washington D.C.	Watercolour and ink on paper, on artist's mount
	1925; Small Portrait of a Girl in Yellow	23.8 x 21.3	Metropolitan Museum of Art, New York	Gypsum and oil on canvas
	1925; May Picture	42.2 x 49.5	Metropolitan Museum of Art, New York	Oil on cardboard
	1925; Horizon, Zenith and Atmosphere	37.1 x 27	Solomon R. Guggenheim Museum, New York	Watercolour and graphite on paper, on paperboard
	1925; Ghost Chamber with the Tall Door (New Version)	61 x 42.2	Metropolitan Museum of Art, New York	Watercolour and ink on paper, on cardboard
	1925; The Goldfish	49.6 x 69.2	Kunsthalle Hamburg	Oil and watercolor on paper, on cardboard
	1925; The Flora of the Heath	24.1 x 32	Pinakothek der Moderne, Munich	Watercolour on paper
	1925; Oriental pleasure garden	41.3 x 42.1	Metropolitan Museum of Art, New York	Oil on cardboard
	1925; Still Life with Fragments	43.1 x 72.4	Art Institute of Chicago	Oil and watercolour on cardboard
	1925; Fish Magic	77.3 x 98.5	Philadelphia Museum of Art	Oil and watercolour on canvas, on panel
	1925; Abstraction with Reference to a Flowering Tree	39.3 x 39.1	National Museum of Modern Art, Tokyo	Oil on board
	1926; Magic Garden	52.1 x 42.2	Solomon R. Guggenheim Museum, New York	Oil on plaster
	1926; Demon as Pirate	29.8 x 43.2	Philadelphia Museum of Art	Watercolour on paper, on board
	1926; Animal Terror	35.2 x 48.4	Philadelphia Museum of Art	Tempera on canvas
	1926; Collection of Figurines	26.7 x 24.8	Metropolitan Museum of Art, New York	Oil on canvas
	1926; Bird Wandering Off	40.3 x 48.6	Metropolitan Museum of Art, New York	Gouache on paper, on cardboard
	1926; Place Signs	27.6 x 37.5	Barnes Foundation, Philadelphia	Watercolour on paper, on paperboard
	1926; Village Carnival	65.2 x 44	Philadelphia Museum of Art	Oil on canvas, on panel
	1926; Scholar in Dealing with Stars	44.4 30.5	Pinakothek der Moderne, Munich	Watercolour and tempera on paper
	1926; Glance of a Landscape	30.2 x 46	Philadelphia Museum of Art	Watercolour on paper, on board
	1927; Omega 5 (Traps)	57.3 x 43	Thyssen-Bornemisza Museum, Madrid	Oil and watercolour on canvas, on cardboard
	1927; Threatening Snowstorm	49.9 x 31.6	Scottish National Gallery of Modern Art, Edinburgh	Watercolour and ink on paper, on card
	1927; Still Life	47.9 x 64.1	Metropolitan Museum of Art, New York	Oil on gypsum
	1927; Journey in Corsica	48.9 x 66	Philadelphia Museum of Art	Watercolour and ink on paper, on board
	1927; Pavilion Decked with Flags	39.9 x 60	Sprengel Museum, Hanover	Oil on wood
	1927; Heavenly and Earthly Time	41.1 x 49.8	Philadelphia Museum of Art	Watercolour and ink on paper, on board
	1927; Coastal Town Decked with Flags	22.1 x 32.3	Sprengel Museum, Hanover	Watercolour and gouache on paper, on cardboard
	1927; Seaside Resort in the South of France	32.7 x 48.8	Tate Modern, London	Graphite, crayon and watercolour on paper, on board
	1927; Adventurer Ship	30 x 46.3	Pinakothek der Moderne, Munich	Watercolour and gouache on a black ground
	1927; Historical Site	35.5 x 48.7	Tate Modern, London	Watercolour and ink on paper, on board
	1927; Chosen Site	57.7 x 40.8	Pinakothek der Moderne, Munich	
	1927; Variations (Progressive Motif)	40.6 x 40	Metropolitan Museum of Art, New York	Oil and watercolour on canvas
	1927; Ships in the Dark	42.7 x 59	Tate Modern, London	Oil on canvas
	1927; Limits of Reason	56.3 x 41.5	Pinakothek der Moderne, Munich	Tempera on canvas
	1927; Comic Opera Singer	49 x 53	Pinakothek der Moderne, Munich	Tempera on cardboard
	1927; Prestidigitator	49.7 x 41.8	Philadelphia Museum of Art	Oil and watercolour on fabric, on cardboard
	1928; Cat and Bird	38.1 x 53.2	Museum of Modern Art, New York	Oil and ink on canvas, on wood
	1928; Small House in the Garden City	29.2 x 45.7	Philadelphia Museum of Art	Watercolour on paper, on board
	1928; Stakim	20.3 x 32.4	Art Institute of Chicago	Oil on plaster
	1928; Marjamshausen	41.7 x 31.3	Museum of Fine Arts, Houston	Watercolour and gouache on paper, on paperboard
	1928; Temple Quarter of Pert	27.5 x 42	Sprengel Museum, Hanover	Watercolour and ink on paper, on cardboard
	1928; Howling Dog	44.5 x 56.8	Minneapolis Institute of Art	Oil on canvas
	1928; Small Landscape with Garden Door	20.3 x 35.5	Detroit Institute of Arts	Oil on plaster
	1928; Passing by Red Pillars	24 x 32.2	National Gallery of Art, Washington D.C.	Gesso, watercolour and casein on paper
	1928; Fast getroffen (Nearly Hit)	50.8 x 39.3	San Francisco Museum of Modern Art	oil on cardboard
	1928; Castle and Sun		Private collection	Oil on canvas
	1929; Hauptweg und Nebenwege	83.7 x 67.5	Museum Ludwig, Cologne	Oil on canvas
	1929; In the Current Six Thresholds	43.5 x 43.5	Solomon R. Guggenheim Museum, New York	Oil and tempera on canvas
	1929; Salt	22.9 x 22.9	Museum of Fine Arts, Houston	Watercolor and ink on paper, on paperboard
	1929; Fire in the Evening	33.8 x 33.3	Museum of Modern Art, New York	Oil on cardboard
	1929; Into the Cave	41 x 52.4	Detroit Institute of Arts	Ink watercolor and pastel on paper, on cardboard
	1929; Monuments at G.	69.5 × 50.5	Metropolitan Museum of Art	Watercolour and gypsum on canvas
	1929; Fleeing Ghost	89.5 x 63.5	Art Institute of Chicago	Oil on canvas
	1929; The Balloon in the Window	32.5 x 24.2	Private collection	Watercolour on paper
	1930; Rhythmic	69.6 x 50.5	Musée National d'Art Moderne, Paris	Oil on burlap
	1930; Floating	84 x 84	Zentrum Paul Klee, Bern	Oil on canvas
	1930; The Castle Mountain of S.	36.8 x 46.7	Tate Modern, London	Gouache on paper, on board
	1930; North German City	48.3 x 46.7	Metropolitan Museum of Art	Gouache and watercolor on gesso, on paper, on cardboard
	1930; Scaffolding of a New Building in 1930.41	30.1 x 45.5	Pinakothek der Moderne, Munich	Gouache on paper
	1930; Doctor	64.8 x 47.9	Metropolitan Museum of Art	Watercolor, gouache, and oil wash on paper, on cardboard
	1930; Great Hall for Singers	39.4 x 58.7	Metropolitan Museum of Art	Watercolor and gouache on gesso, on paper, on cardboard
	1930; Strange Glance	65.4 x 38.1	Art Institute of Chicago	Oil on canvas
	1930; Portrait in the Arbor	33.3 x 24.1	Private collection	Gouache on paper, on artist's mount
	1930; Sunset	46.1 x 70.5	Art Institute of Chicago	Oil on canvas
	1931; Cliffs by the Sea	44 x 62	Lenbachhaus, Munich	Oil on canvas
	1931; Boy in Fancy Dress	62.9 x 47.9	Metropolitan Museum of Art, New York	Watercolor and gouache on paper, on cardboard
	1931; C. - C. = Fisch	23.2 x 31.4	Minneapolis Institute of Art	Watercolour and ink on paper, on board
	1931; Crosses and Pillars	38 x 53	Pinakothek der Moderne, Munich	Watercolour on copperplate paper
	1931; Diana	80 x 60	Foundation Beyeler, Riehen	Oil on canvas
	1931; Dredger and Sailboat	43.5 x 64	National Gallery of Art, Washington D.C.	Watercolour on paper
	1931; Rocky Coast	50.6 x 52.7	Kunsthalle Hamburg	Oil on plywood
	1931; Aufgehender Stern	63 x 50	Foundation Beyeler, Riehen	Oil on canvas
	1931; Das Licht und Etliches	95 x 97.5	Pinakothek der Moderne, Munich	Oil on canvas
	1932; Village among Rocks	46 x 56.5	Barnes Foundation, Philadelphia	Gouache and ink on canvas
	1932; Barbarian Sacrifice	62.9 x 48	Solomon R. Guggenheim Museum, New York	Watercolor on paper, on board
	1932; Pastor Kohl	50 x 65	Pinakothek der Moderne, Munich	Oil on cloth, on plywood
	1932; Two Ways	31.3 x 48.4	Solomon R. Guggenheim Museum, New York	Watercolour on paper
	1932; The Last Mercenary	32.7 x 21	Barnes Foundation, Philadelphia	Watercolour on paper, on paperboard
	1932; Mask of Fear	100.4 x 57.1	Museum of Modern Art, New York	Oil on burlap
	1932; Ad Parnassum	66.5 x 106	Kunstmuseum Bern	Oil on canvas
	1932; Hat, Lady and Little Table	63.5 x 35.5	Solomon R. Guggenheim Museum, New York	Gouache and watercolour on burlap, on board
	1932; Clarification	70.5 x 96.2	Metropolitan Museum of Art, New York	Oil on canvas
	1932; Spiral Screw Flowers II	37.4 x 48.3	Sprengel Museum, Hanover	Watercolour and pencil on paper, on cardboard
	1932; Walk in the Orient	21 x 33	Barnes Foundation, Philadelphia	Watercolour on paper, on paperboard
	1932; Athlete's Head	62.9 x 47.9	Metropolitan Museum of Art, New York	Watercolor, gouache, and graphite on paper, on cardboard
	1932; Two Red Flowers	21 x 28.3	Barnes Foundation, Philadelphia	Watercolour and ink on paper, on paperboard
	1932; Fermata	22.2 x 28.3	Philadelphia Museum of Art	Watercolour on paper, on board
	1933; La Kash-Ne	35.6 × 21.3	Metropolitan Museum of Art, New York	Oil on paper, on cardboard
	1933; Tragedy	57.6 x 43.7	Sprengel Museum, Hanover	Watercolour on gauze, on cardboard
	1933; Fire at Full Moon	50 x 65	Museum Folkwang, Essen	Watercolour over Paste on Canvas
	1933; Skeptically Smiling	32.3 x 20.3	Denver Art Museum	Watercolor and charcoal on paper

== 1934-40 Switzerland ==
Image	Date Title	Size (cm)	Museum	Medium
	1934; Botanical Theater	50 x 67	Lenbachhaus, Munich	Oil, watercolor and ink on paper, on cardboard
	1934; One Who Understands	54 x 40.6	Metropolitan Museum of Art, New York	Oil and gypsum on canvas
	1934; In the Magic Mirror	66 x 50	Art Institute of Chicago	Oil on canvas, on board
	1934; Hardy Plants	40.9 x 54.9	Minneapolis Institute of Art	Oil on pulpboard
	1935; But the Red Roof	60.3 x 90.6	Philadelphia Museum of Art	Tempera on fabric
	1935; Walpurgis Night	50.8 x 47	Tate Modern, London	Gouache on fabric, on plywood
	1935; At the Core	47.3 x 60	Dallas Museum of Art	Oil and mixed media on burlap, on board
	1935 A day in the forest	17.8 x 27.7	Galerie Knoell, Basel	Gouache and watercolor on paper on cardboard
	1936; Nach der Überschwemmung	47.9 x 62.6	Foundation Beyeler, Riehen	Colored paste and watercolor on paper, on cardboard
	1936; Southern Garden	26.5 x 31	Sprengel Museum, Hanover	Watercolour on canvas, on cardboard
	1936; Stricken City	45.1 x 35.2	Metropolitan Museum of Art, New York	Oil and gypsum on canvas
	1937; Zeichen in Gelb	83.5 x 50.3	Foundation Beyeler, Riehen	Pastel on cotton on colored paste on burlap
	1937; Still Life in Brown	29.5 x 20.8	Museum of Fine Arts, Houston	Oil on paper
	1937; Women Harvesting	50 x 54	Art Institute of Chicago	Pastel on canvas, on burlap
	1937; The Rhine at Duisburg	19.1 x 27.9	Metropolitan Museum of Art	Gypsum, oil, and charcoal on cardboard
	1937; Lying Comfortably	16.7 x 24.2	Sprengel Museum, Hanover	Pastel on paper, on cardboard
	1937; Chalice of the Heart	37.1 x 49.4	National Gallery of Art, Washington D.C.	Gouache
	1937; Reclining	34.3 x 61	Detroit Institute of Arts	Oil on burlap
	1937; City Core	37.8 x 42	Kunsthalle Hamburg	Mixed media on fine tissue on painted canvas
	1937; Revolution of the Viaduct	60 x 50	Kunsthalle Hamburg	Oil on cotton
	1938; Archangel	100 x 65	Lenbachhaus, Munich	Oil on fabric
	1938; Insula dulcamara	88 x 176	Zentrum Paul Klee, Bern	Oil on newsprint, on burlap
	1938; Wald-Hexen	99 x 74	Foundation Beyeler, Riehen	Oil on paper on burlap
	1938; Broken Key	50 x 66	Sprengel Museum, Hanover	Oil and paste on newspaper, on fabric
	1938; Harmonized Region	38.7 x 47	Art Institute of Chicago	Oil on burlap, on cardboard
	1938; Die Vase	88 x 54.5	Foundation Beyeler, Riehen	Oil on burlap
	1938; Heroic Strokes of the Bow	73 x 53	Museum of Modern Art, New York	Pigmented paste on newspaper, on dyed cloth, on board
	1938; Halme	50.9 x 35.7	Foundation Beyeler, Riehen	Colored paste on paper, on cardboard
	1938; Comedians' Handbill	54.6 x 36.2	Metropolitan Museum of Art, New York	Gouache on newsprint, on cardboard
	1938; Ein Weib für Götter	44.3 x 60.5	Foundation Beyeler, Riehen	Colored paste and watercolour on paper, on cardboard
	1938; Little Hope	46 x 51.8	Metropolitan Museum of Art, New York	Plaster and watercolor on burlap, on cardboard
	1939; Waterbirds	27 x 21.4	Museum of Fine Arts, Boston	Graphite and watercolour
	1939; Catastrophe in a Dream	23.5 x 52.5	Sprengel Museum, Hanover	Chalk and pencil on paper, on cardboard
	1939; Glüht Nach	29.5 x 21	Foundation Beyeler, Riehen	Watercolour and pencil on paper, on cardboard
	1939; On Wheels	29.6 x 25.6	Sprengel Museum, Hanover	Oil and paste on paper, on cardboard
	1939; Rocks at Night	20.9 x 25.5	Solomon R. Guggenheim Museum, New York	Watercolour and ink on paper
	1939; Baroque Centaur	32.1 x 24	National Gallery of Art, Washington D.C.	Gouache on paper
	1939; Girl in Mourning	66.4 x 50.2	Metropolitan Museum of Art, New York	Gouache, pastel, and charcoal on paper, on cardboard
	1939; Conch–Still Life II	27.9 x 21.9	Philadelphia Museum of Art	Watercolour on paper, on board
	1939; Angel Applicant	65.4 x 44.5	Metropolitan Museum of Art, New York	Gouache, ink, and graphite on paper, on cardboard
	1939; O die Gerüchte	75.5 x 55	Foundation Beyeler, Riehen	Tempera and oil on burlap
	1939; Blue-Bird-Pumpkin	34.3 x 49.2	Metropolitan Museum of Art, New York	Gouache on paper, on cardboard
	1939; This Bloom is about to Wither	29.2 x 20.8	Barnes Foundation, Philadelphia	Watercolour and crayon on paper, on paperboard
	1939; Exotics	71.1 x 55.9	Art Institute of Chicago	Oil on burlap
	1939; Ein Tor	31.6 x 14	Foundation Beyeler, Riehen	Tempera on paper, on cardboard
	1939; Historic Ground	26.8 x 22.2	Barnes Foundation, Philadelphia	Watercolour on paper, on paperboard
	1940; Nomad Mother	29.4 x 20.6	Museum of Fine Arts, Boston	Watercolour and crayon on paper
	1940; Schlamm-Assel-Fisch	34 x 53.5	Foundation Beyeler, Riehen	Coloured paste and crayon on newspaper, on cardboard
	1940; Death and Fire	46.7 × 44.6	Zentrum Paul Klee, Bern	Oil and paste on burlap
	1940; The Hour Before One Night	44.5 x 59.7	Metropolitan Museum of Art	Gouache on paper, on cardboard
	1940; Going next Door	34.6 x 52.2	Sprengel Museum, Hanover	Paste on paper, on cardboard
	1940; Ohne Titel	48 x 44	Foundation Beyeler, Riehen	Oil and colored paste on burlap

== See also ==
- Ab ovo (1917)
- Swamp Legend (1919)
- Villa R (1919)
- Angelus Novus (1920)
- Camel (in rhythmic landscape with trees) (1920)
- Senecio (1922)
- Twittering Machine (1922)
- Architecture (1923)
- Fish Magic (1925)
- Limits of Reason (1927)
- Cat and Bird (1928)
- Highway and Byways (1929)
- Has Head, Hand, Feet and Heart (1930)
- Ad Parnassum (1932)
- In the Magic Mirror (1934)
- Insula dulcamara (1938)
- Angel, Still Groping (1939)
- Death and Fire (1940)

== List of other works ==
- A Man Sinks Down Before the Crown, (1904), Chicago Art Institute
- A Phantom Crumbles, (1927), Chicago Art Institute
- Acrobats (Artisten) at the Guggenheim Museum
- Aged Phoenix (Invention 9) (Greiser Phönix) at the Guggenheim Museum
- An Angel Brings what is Desired, (1920), Chicago Art Institute
- Architecture, (1921), Chicago Art Institute
- Artistic Comedy, (1932), Chicago Art Institute
- A Pious One (Ein Frommer) at the Guggenheim Museum
- Blooming Plant, (1931), Chicago Art Institute
- Castle and Sun, (1928), Private collection
- Comedian (Invention 4) (Komiker) at the Guggenheim Museum
- Dancing Girl, (1940), Chicago Art Institute
- Departure of the Ghost, (1931).
- Dream City, (1921), Private collection
- Duke Leader Ladder, Not Alone, (1938), Chicago Art Institute
- Festival of the Lanterns, Bauhaus, (1922), Chicago Art Institute
- Fun on the Inland Lake, (1932), Chicago Art Institute
- Gemmi Pass, Valais Alps (Gemmi Passhöhe, Walliseralpen) at the Guggenheim Museum
- Great Harbor, (1932), Chicago Art Institute
- Height, (1928), Chicago Art Institute
- Hilterfingen at the Guggenheim Museum
- Hoffmannesque Fairy-Tale Scene, (1921), Chicago Art Institute
- In Angel's Care (In Engelshut) at the Guggenheim Museum
- In Readiness (Bereitschaft) at the Guggenheim Museum
- Inscription (Inschrift) at the Guggenheim Museum
- Jumping Jack (Hampelmann) at the Guggenheim Museum
- Mosaic-Like, (1932), Chicago Art Institute
- Portrait Sketch of a Costumed Lady (Bildnisskizze einer kostümierten Dame) at the Guggenheim Museum
- Public Duel (Öffentliches Duell) at the Guggenheim Museum
- Singed Garden, (1924), Chicago Art Institute
- Singer of the Comic Opera (Sängerin der komischen Oper) at the Guggenheim Museum
- Starving Spirits, (1934), Chicago Art Institute
- The Sublime Aspect, (1923), Chicago Art Institute
- Thunersee near Schadau (Thunersee bei Schadau) at the Guggenheim Museum
- Tree Culture (Baum Kultur) at the Guggenheim Museum
- Two Men Meet, each Believing the Other to be of Higher Rank, (1903), Chicago Art Institute
- Untitled, (1918), Chicago Art Institute
- Virgin Dreaming, (1903), Chicago Art Institute
