= Villa R =

Painting by Paul Klee

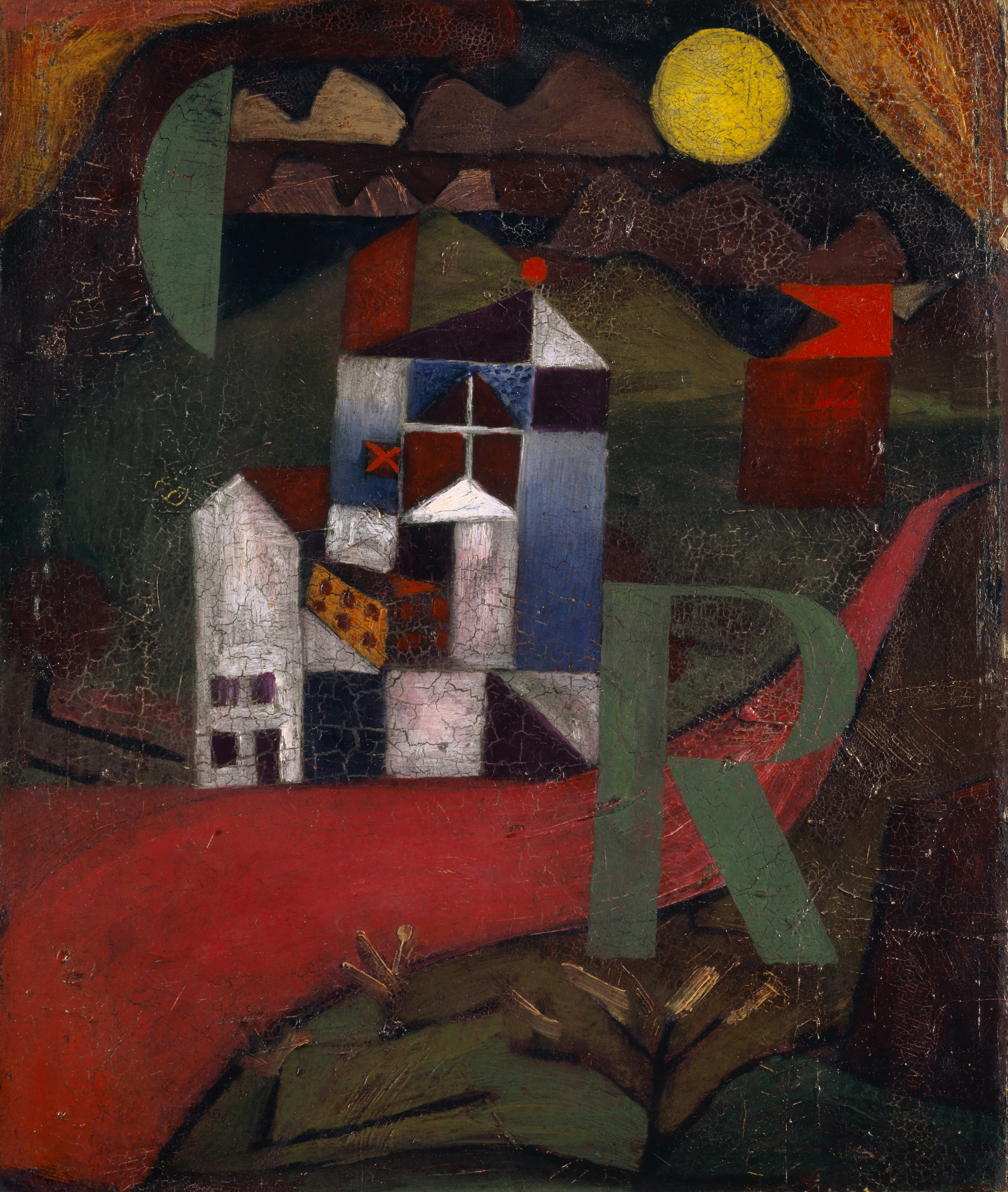
- Artist: Paul Klee
- Year: 1919
- Medium: oil on wooden panel
- Dimensions: 26.5 cm × 22.4 cm (10.4 in × 8.8 in)
- Location: Kunstmuseum Basel, Basel

Villa R is an oil-on-carton painting from 1919 by the Swiss-born German artist Paul Klee.

== Description ==
The work depicts a white villa standing beside a red road winding into the mountains beyond. A yellow full moon shines overhead. In the foreground is a large capital letter R which appears to be a part of the landscape. The red road forms a diagonal across the painting and a row of green shapes, including the green letter R, form a second intersecting diagonal. The villa is positioned at the intersection.

== Title ==
The significance of the letter R is not revealed in the painting's title, but is believed to stand for Rosa. Klee had seen a Villa Rosa in the early 1900s on his travels through Italy, accompanied by Goethe's travel diary Italian Journey.

== Provenance ==
In 1939 the painting was confiscated from an art gallery in Frankfurt am Main by the Nazis as "degenerate art" and sent with other confiscated works in the Degenerate Art auction by the Fischer gallery in the Grand Hotel National in Lucerne, Switzerland. There it was sold to its current owners, the Kunstmuseum Basel.

== See also ==
- List of works by Paul Klee
