= In the Magic Mirror =

1934 painting by Paul Klee

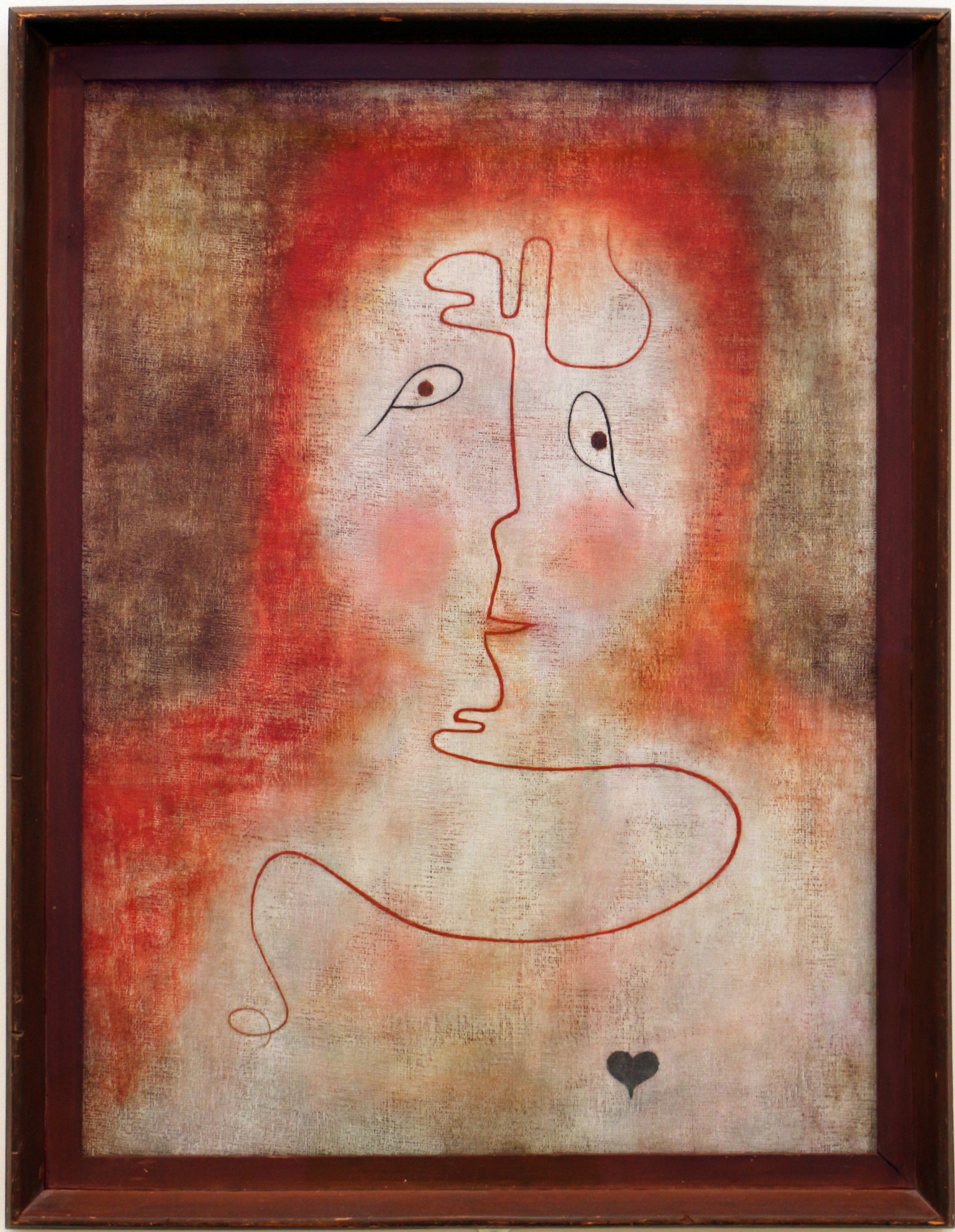
- Artist: Paul Klee
- Year: 1934
- Medium: oil on canvas on board
- Dimensions: 66 cm × 50 cm (26 in × 20 in)
- Location: Art Institute of Chicago, Chicago

In the Magic Mirror is an abstract oil painting produced in 1934 by the Swiss-based German artist Paul Klee. It is now in the collection of the Art Institute of Chicago.

== Description ==
The painting features a blank face on which a vertical line snakes from top to bottom. Klee was fond of describing his art as "taking a line for a walk," featuring a line that starts as an eyebrow and ends as a chin. In the process three faces evolve, one looking left, one looking right and one looking out of the canvas with two tear-shaped eyes. Below the faces is a single isolated black heart.

== Analysis ==
Produced shortly after Klee was branded a degenerate artist by the ruling Nazi Party in 1933, with the subsequent loss of his position in Germany and his forced move to Switzerland, the painting appears to represent his disillusionment. The knotted brow, the tear-shaped eyes and the black heart communicate anxiety, distress and bitterness.

== See also ==
- List of works by Paul Klee
