= Insula dulcamara =

Painting by Paul Klee

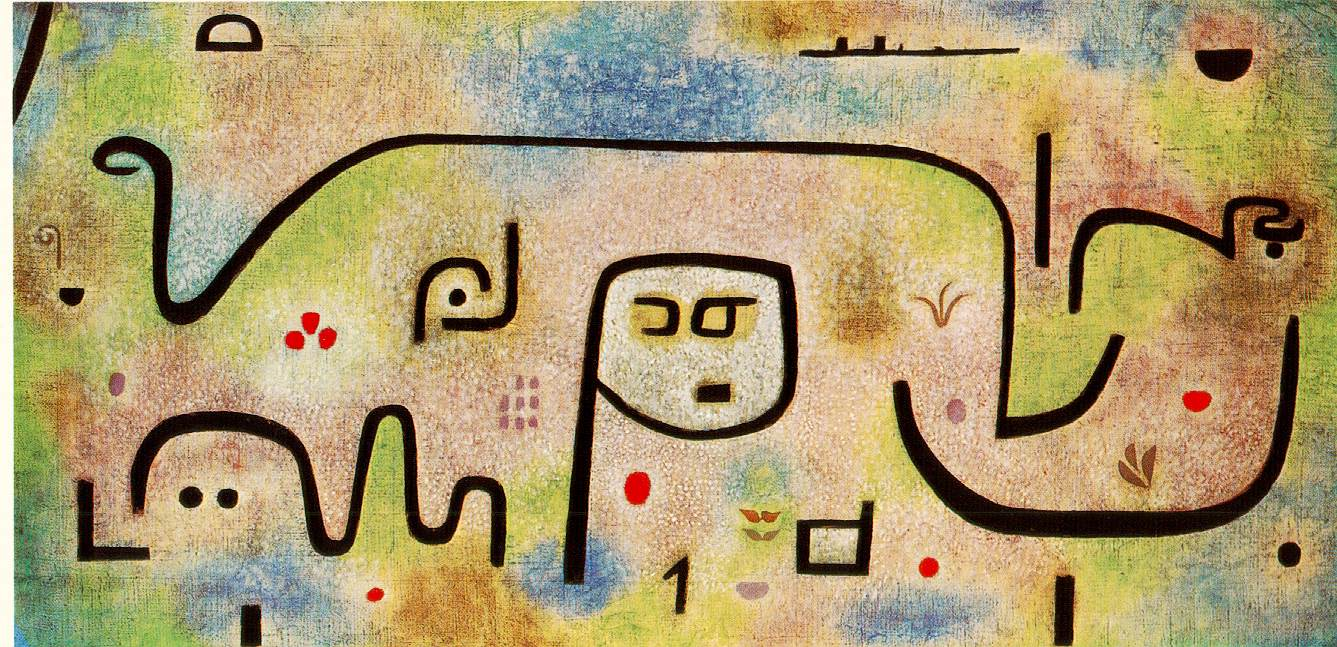
- Artist: Paul Klee
- Year: 1938
- Medium: oil on newsprint on burlap
- Dimensions: 88 cm × 176 cm (35 in × 69 in)
- Location: Zentrum Paul Klee, Bern

Insula dulcamara is an oil painting on newsprint pasted to burlap by the Swiss-based abstract artist Paul Klee, initiated in 1938 when he was suffering from the wasting disease scleroderma. It is his largest work and part of the collection of the Zentrum Paul Klee in Bern.

== Description ==
Like much of Klee's output, the image conveys a coded message, asking the viewer to reflect on the artist's thought processes during its creation. The conventional interpretation, led by the fact that the original title of the painting was to be Calypso's Island, is that the symbols arranged on a plain background represent a desert island complete with an idol and passing steamship.

== Analysis ==
However, a newer analysis by academic Chris Pike suggests that the symbols represent Klee's own identity and mortality, spelling out his name and referencing aspects of his life and interests. Starting at the centre-left enclosed dot sign representing "origin", it is possible to discern the letters of the word Paul. The letters of the word Klee are not as obvious but can be determined with imagination, especially in comparison with his written signature. The pale face in the letter P may represent his skin tones resulting from his medical condition and approaching death. The red spots may represent the berries of the Solanum dulcamara (woody nightshade) plant mentioned in the work's title.

== See also ==
- List of works by Paul Klee
