= Architecture (Klee) =

Painting by Paul Klee

- Architektur (German)
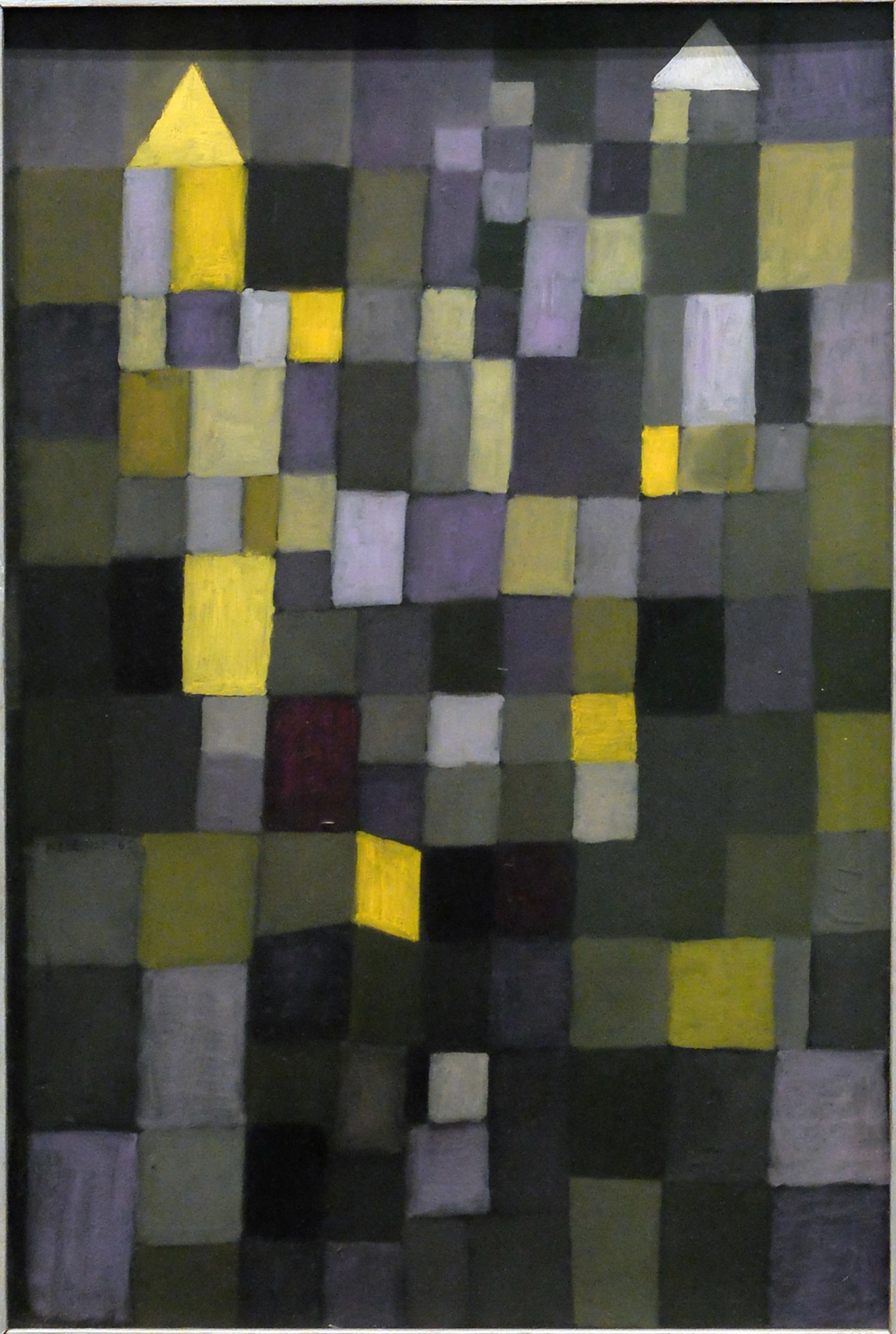
- Artist: Paul Klee
- Year: 1923
- Type: Oil on cardboard
- Dimensions: 57 cm × 37.5 cm (22 in × 14.8 in)
- Location: Neue Nationalgalerie, Berlin

Architecture is an oil on cardboard painting by the Swiss-German painter Paul Klee, created in 1923. It is part of his Magic Squares series, where Klee studied the effects of repeating the same elements, in a largely abstract style. It is held at the Neue Nationalgalerie, in Berlin.

== History and description ==
Klee was teaching at Bauhaus, in 1923, and it can be considered that for this painting he was influenced by the importance that architecture had in that art school. It has been speculated that this and other paintings of the same period were influenced by Austrian composer Arnold Schoenberg's recent development of a new, radical musical system of twelve tones, his Twelve-tone technique. A similar geometric approach to composition can be seen in this and other works of the same period.

Art critic and historian Will Grohmann states that he found a relation with Schoenberg's method in Klee's writings: "I found a slip of paper among Klee's papers on which was a plan for one of his pictures; numbers were written in the squares, a series of numbers ran first in one direction then in the other, crossing each other. When the numbers are added along the horizontals and verticals, the totals are equal, as in the well-known 'magic square.'"

== See also ==
- List of works by Paul Klee
