= Zentrum Paul Klee =

Coordinates: 46°56′57″N 7°28′26″E

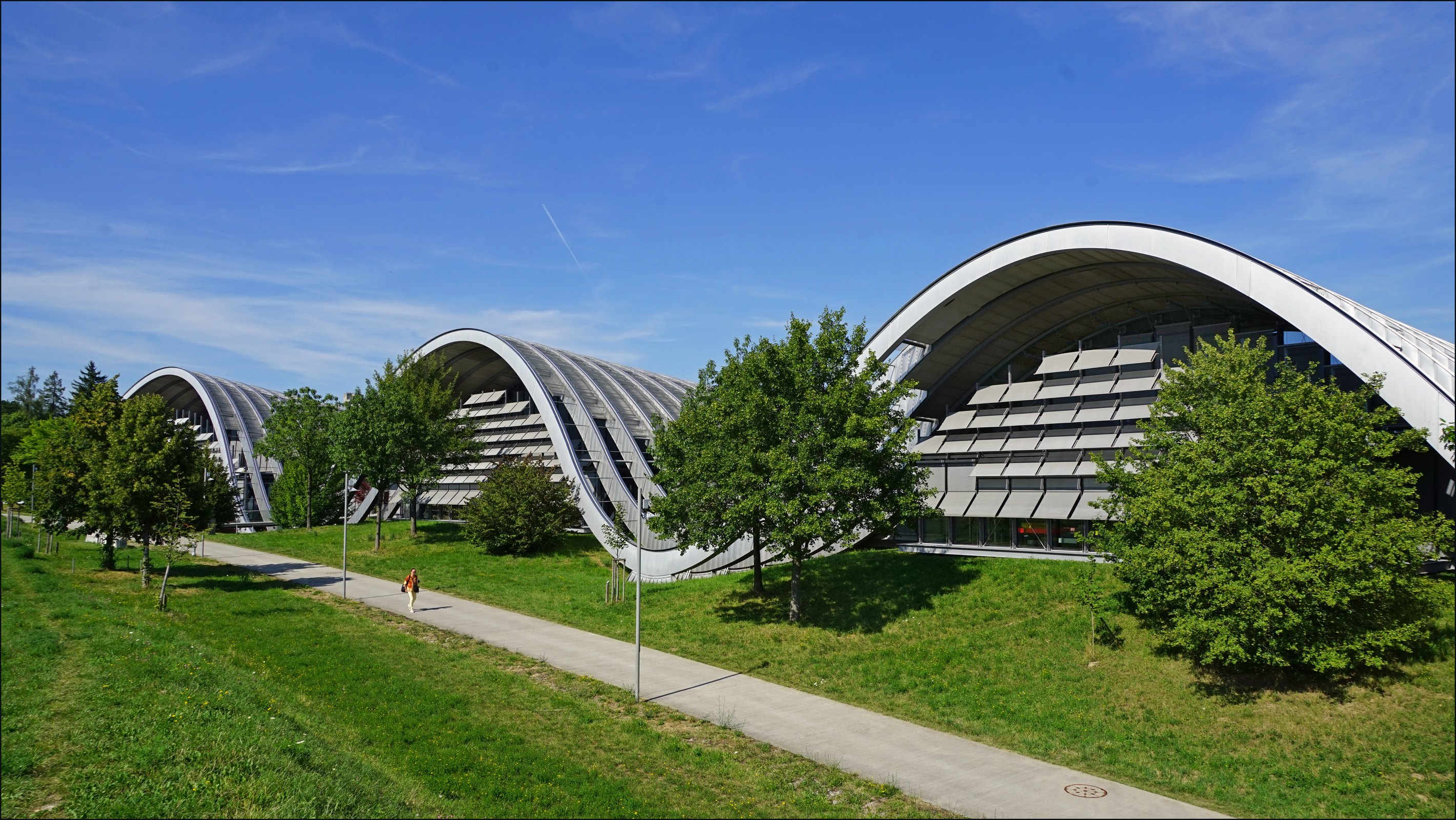
- The Zentrum Paul Klee
- Established: 2005
- Location: Bern, Switzerland
- Type: Art museum
- Collections: Focus on the work of Paul Klee
- Director: Nina Zimmer
- Website: zpk.org

The Zentrum Paul Klee is a museum dedicated to the artist Paul Klee, located in Bern, Switzerland, and designed by the Italian architect Renzo Piano. It features about 40 percent of Paul Klee's entire pictorial oeuvre.

In 1997, Livia Klee-Meyer, Paul Klee's daughter-in-law, donated her inheritance of almost 690 works to the city and canton of Bern. Additional works and documents donated and loaned by the family and the Paul-Klee-Foundation and a further 200 loans from private collections contributed to creating a very large collection of works by the artist. The decision to build the museum in the Schöngrün site on the eastern outskirts of the city was made in 1998, and renowned Italian architect Renzo Piano was contracted the same year. A preliminary project was elaborated in 2000. The building was completed in 2005, with a community garden added to the property in 2021. It takes the form of three undulations blending into the landscape, with each of the three Hills filling a purpose in conjunction with the landscape. Hill North houses Creaviva, an all-ages creative studio, Hill Center houses the museum exhibit space, and Hill South contains the collections and archives space.

== See also ==
- List of single-artist museums
- List of museums in Switzerland

== Other projects ==
Media related to Zentrum Paul Klee at Wikimedia Commons
