= Roberta =

Roberta is a feminine version of the given names Robert and Roberto. It is a Germanic name derived from the stems *hrod meaning "famous", "glorious", "godlike" and *berht meaning "bright", "shining", "light".

== People with the name ==
- Roberta Achtenberg (born 1950), American attorney
- Roberta Acioly (born 1978), Brazilian politician
- Roberta Alaimo (born 1979), Italian politician
- Roberta Alenius (born 1978), Swedish politician
- Roberta Alexander (1949–2025), American operatic soprano
- Roberta Allen (born 1945), American conceptual artist
- Roberta Amadeo (born 1970), Italian para-cyclist
- Roberta Anastase (born 1976), Romanian politician
- Roberta Joan Anderson (born 1943), birth name of Canadian–American singer-songwriter Joni Mitchell
- Roberta Angelilli (born 1965), Italian politician
- Roberta Annan (born 1982), Ghanaian investor and philanthropist
- Roberta Arnold (1896–1966), American stage and silent film actress
- Roberta A. Ballard, American pediatrician
- Roberta Baskin, American journalist and non-profit director
- Roberta Bayley, American photographer
- Roberta Bianconi (born 1989), Italian water polo player
- Roberta Bitgood (1908–2007), American organist, choir director and classical composer
- Roberta Bonanomi (born 1966), Italian road racing cyclist
- Roberta Bondar (born 1945), Canadian astronaut
- Roberta Brunet (born 1965), Italian athlete
- Roberta Bruni (born 1994), Italian pole vaulter
- Roberta Byrd Barr (1919–1993), American civil rights activist, educator and librarian
- Roberta Capua (born 1968), Italian television host, actress, model and beauty pageant titleholder
- Roberta Close (born 1964), Brazilian fashion model
- Roberta Colindrez, Mexican–American actress and playwright
- Roberta Collins (1944–2008), American actress
- Roberta F. Colman (1938–2019), American biochemist
- Roberta Cordano (born 1963), American lawyer
- Roberta Cowing (1860–1924), American artist and scientific illustrator
- Roberta Crenshaw (1914–2005), American civic leader and philanthropist
- Roberta Dapunt (born 1970), Italian poet
- Roberta Degnore (born 1946), American author, filmmaker and psychologist
- Roberta Del Core (born 1964), Italian rower
- Roberta Dodd Crawford (1897–1954), American lyric soprano
- Roberta Donnay (born 1966), American jazz singer
- Roberta Dunbar, American clubwoman and peace activist
- Roberta Eike, American oceanographer and marine geologist
- Roberta Einer, Estonian fashion designer
- Roberta Faccani (born 1968), Italian singer and actress
- Roberta Faccin (born 1957), Italian basketball player
- Roberta Farinelli (born 1975), Italian swimmer
- Roberta Farrell, American–New Zealand biotechnologist
- Roberta M. Feldman, American architect and professor
- Roberta Felotti (born 1964), Italian swimmer
- Roberta Fernández, Tejana novelist
- Roberta Fiandino (born 1985), Italian biathlete
- Roberta Findlay (born 1948), American filmmaker
- Roberta Flack (1937–2025), American jazz and folk singer
- Roberta Floris (born 1979), Italian journalist, television presenter and former model
- Roberta Foster, Barbadian dressage rider
- Roberta Fox (1943–2009), American attorney and politician
- Roberta Freeman, American singer
- Roberta Fulbright (1874–1953), American businesswoman
- Roberta Gale (1914–2008), American actress
- Roberta Gambarini, Italian jazz singer
- Roberta Geddes-Harvey (1849–1930), Canadian choirmaster, composer and organist
- Roberta Gellis (1927–2016), American writer
- Roberta Gemma (born 1980), Italian pornographic actress
- Roberta Gentini (born 1973), Italian equestrian
- Roberta Gilchrist (born 1965), Canadian archaeologist
- Roberta González, French painter
- Roberta Gottlieb, American academic and oncologist
- Roberta Gregory (born 1953), American comic book writer and artist
- Roberta Groner (born 1978), American long-distance runner
- Roberta Gropper (1897–1993), German political activist
- Roberta Grossman (born 1959), American filmmaker
- Roberta Guaspari (born 1947), American violinist and music educator
- Roberta Guerrina, English political scientist
- Roberta Hamme, Canadian chemical oceanographer
- Roberta Hanley, American actress and director
- Roberta Haynes (1927–2019), American actress
- Roberta L. Hazard (1934–2017), American Navy officer
- Roberta Helmer (1950–2018), American romance author
- Roberta Hill Whiteman (born 1947), Oneida poet
- Roberta Hodes (1927–2021), American film producer and script supervisor
- Roberta Hoskie, American real estate broker
- Roberta Howett (born 1981), Irish singer
- Roberta Hubley (born 1941), Canadian politician
- Roberta M. Humphreys (born 1944), American observational stellar astrophysicist
- Roberta Hyson, American actress and dancer
- Roberta Invernizzi (born 1966), Italian soprano and music teacher
- Roberta Jamieson, Canadian First Nations activist and lawyer
- Roberta Frances Johnson (1902–1988), American mathematician
- Roberta Jull (1872–1961), Scottish–Australian medical doctor
- Roberta Kalechofsky (1931–2022), American feminist, writer and animal rights activist
- Roberta Kaplan (born 1966), American lawyer and co-founder of Time's Up Legal Defense Fund
- Roberta Karmel (1937–2024), American attorney
- Roberta Kelly (born 1942), American gospel singer
- Roberta Kerr (born 1952), English actress
- Roberta Kevelson (1931–1998), American academic and semiotician
- Roberta Klatzky (born 1947), American psychology professor
- Roberta Knie (1938–2017), American dramatic soprano
- Roberta Lange (born 1957), American politician
- Roberta Lannes (born 1948), American horror writer
- Roberta Lanzarotti (born 1968), Italian swimmer
- Roberta Latow (1931–2003), American erotic author, gallery owner and interior designer
- Roberta Lawson (1878–1940), Lenape activist, musician and community organizer
- Roberta Leigh (1926–2014), English author, composer and television producer
- Roberta Lepper (born 1978), Fijian sailor
- Roberta Lima (born 1974), Brazilian–Austrian video and performance artist
- Roberta Linn (born 1931), American singer
- Roberta Lobeira Alanís (born 1979), Mexican painter and visual artist
- Roberta Lombardi (born 1973), Italian politician
- Roberta MacAdams (1880–1959), Canadian politician and military dietician
- Roberta MacGlashan, American politician
- Roberta Mancino (born 1980), Italian skydiver and wingsuit flyer
- Roberta Marques (born 1968), Brazilian film director, producer and screenwriter
- Roberta Marquez, Brazilian ballet dancer
- Roberta Marrero (born 1972), Spanish actress and singer
- Roberta Marinelli, American oceanographer
- Roberta Martin (1907–1969), American gospel composer, singer, pianist, arranger, and choral organizer
- Roberta Martinelli (born 1981), Brazilian journalist and radio presenter
- Roberta Marzani (born 1996), Italian fencer
- Roberta Materi (born 1975), Canadian curler
- Roberta Maxwell (born 1941), Canadian actress
- Roberta McCain (1912–2020), American socialite and oil heiress
- Roberta McCallum (born 1958), American tennis player
- Roberta McRae (born 1948), Italian–Australian politician
- Roberta Metsola (born 1979), Maltese politician and President of the European Union Parliament
- Roberta Michnick Golinkoff, American academic and author
- Roberta Millstein, American philosophy professor
- Roberta Miranda (born 1956), Brazilian singer
- Roberta Moretti Avery (born 1985), Brazilian cricketer
- Roberta Morris Purdee, American documentarian and film producer
- Roberta Naas (born 1958), American author and journalist
- Roberta J. Nichols (1931–2005), American engineer
- Roberta O'Brien, Irish Navy officer
- Roberta Panara (born 1984), Italian swimmer
- Roberta Pedranzini (born 1971), Italian ski mountaineer
- Roberta Pelosi (born 1960), Italian sport shooter
- Roberta Peters (1930–2017), American coloratura soprano
- Roberta Piket (born 1965), American jazz pianist, organist, arranger and composer
- Roberta Pinotti (born 1961), Italian politician
- Roberta Rabellotti, Italian economics professor
- Roberta Ratzke (born 1990), Brazilian volleyball player
- Roberta L. Raymond (1938–2019), American actress and sociologist
- Roberta Rees (born 1954), Canadian poet and writer
- Roberta Richman (born 1941), American painter, printmaker and corrections administrator
- Roberta Rodeghiero (born 1990), Italian figure skater
- Roberta Rodrigues (born 1982), Brazilian actress and singer
- Roberta Rogow (born 1942), American fanfiction writer
- Roberta Romano, American law professor
- Roberta Rosenthal Kwall, American law professor
- Roberta Rudnick (born 1958), American geologist and professor
- Roberta Sá, also known as Roberta de Sá, a Brazilian singer
- Roberta Seelinger Trites (born 1962), American English Literature professor
- Roberta Serra (born 1970), Italian alpine skier
- Roberta Sessoli (born 1963), Italian chemistry professor
- Roberta Semple Salter (1910–2007), American evangelist, daughter of Aimee Semple McPherson
- Roberta I. Shaffer (born 1953), American attorney and librarian
- Roberta Sheffield (born 1980), British-Canadian Para-equestrian
- Roberta Shepherd (born 1934), Australian physiotherapist
- Roberta Sheridan (1864–1918), American teacher
- Roberta Sherwood (1913–1999), American singer
- Roberta Shore (born 1943), American actress
- Roberta Sigel (1916–2008), American political scientist
- Roberta Silva (born 1971), Trinidadian artist
- Roberta Sinatra, Italian professor and scientist
- Roberta Sklar, American activist and theater director
- Roberta Smith (born 1948), American art critic
- Roberta Tamondong (born 2002), Filipino actress, model and beauty pageant titleholder
- Roberta Taylor (1948–2024), English actress and author
- Roberta Teale Swartz (1903–1993), American academic, poet and co-founder of the Kenyon Review
- Roberta Temes, American author and psychotherapist
- Roberta Thornley (born 1985), New Zealand photographer
- Roberta Tomber (1954–2022), English archaeologist
- Roberta Torre (born 1962), Italian director and screenwriter
- Roberta Tovey (born 1953), English actress
- Roberta Valderrama (born 1977), Peruvian actress
- Roberta Vinci (born 1983), Italian tennis player
- Roberta Voss (born 1965), American politician
- Roberta Washington, American architect
- Roberta Weiss (born 1961), Canadian actress
- Roberta Williams (born 1953), American video game designer and writer
- Roberta Wilson (1896–1977), American silent film actress
- Roberta Whyte (1897–1979), English Royal Air Force nursing administrator
- Roberta Wohlstetter (1912–2007), American military historian
- Roberta Woodgate (born 1956), Canadian nurse
- Roberta Zambrano (born 1971), Ecuadorian politician

== Fictional characters ==
- Roberta "Bobby" Bruna, from the fantasy novel book series Skandar and the Unicorn Thief by A. F. Steadman
- Rosarita "Roberta" Cisneros, from the anime and manga series Black Lagoon
- Roberta Tubbs, from the animated series The Cleveland Show
- Rexy, also known as Roberta, from Jurassic Park
- Roberta "Bobbie" Draper from the science fiction books The Expanse
- Roberta "Bobbi" Anderson, from the sci-fi/horror novel The Tommyknockers by Stephen King
