= University Laboratory High School =

University Laboratory High School may refer to:

- Louisiana State University Laboratory School in Baton Rouge
- University Laboratory High School (Urbana, Illinois)
