= Milen Minkov =

Bulgarian-Austrian pediatrician

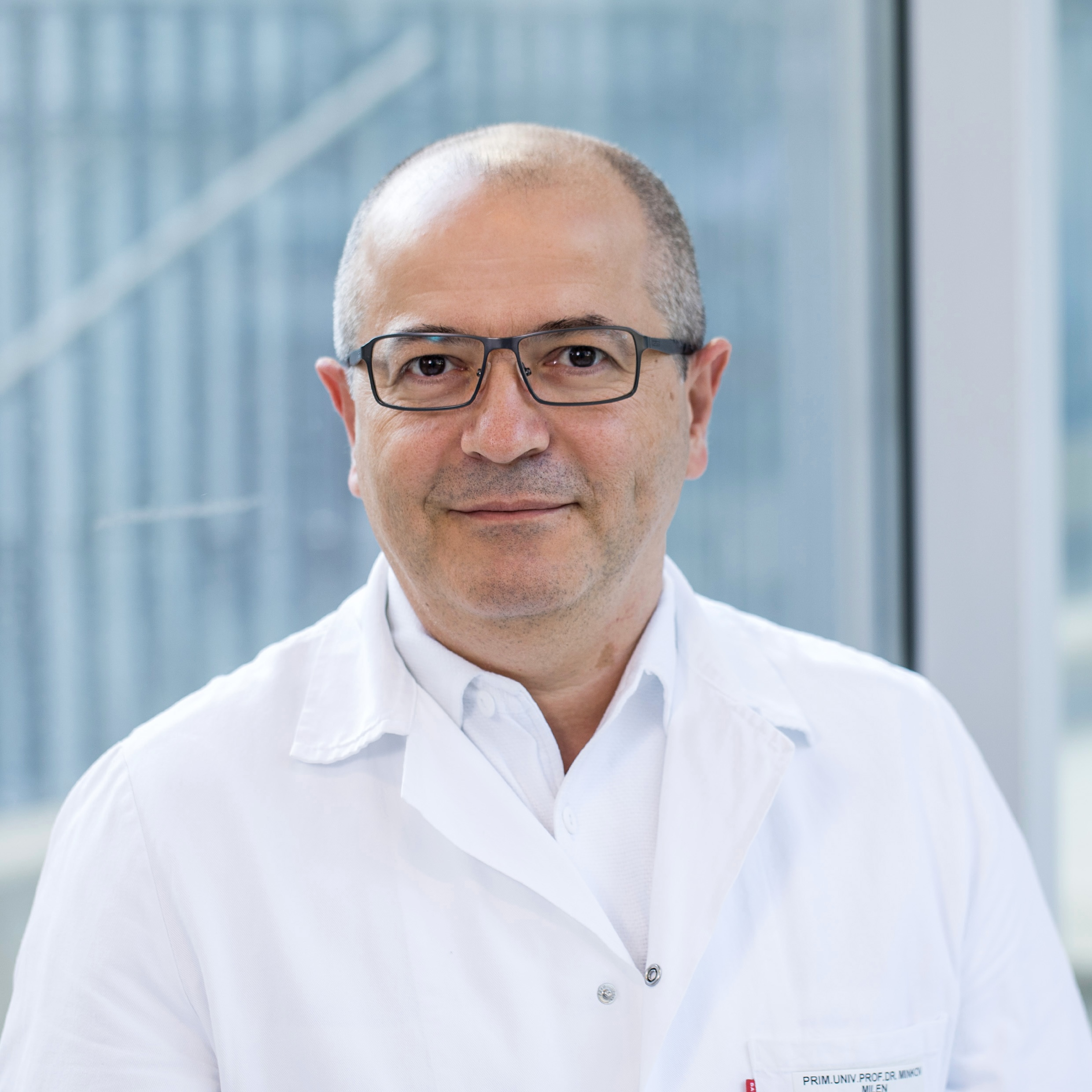
- Born: June 29, 1965 (age 60)
- Occupation: Pediatrician
- Medical career
- Field: Pediatrics, Oncology, Cancer Research
- Website: drminkov.at

Milen Minkov (born June 29, 1965) is a Bulgarian-Austrian pediatrician and pediatric hematologist/oncologist who has contributed to pediatric hematology, particularly Langerhans cell histiocytosis.

Minkov is Full Professor of Pediatrics and Director of the Center for Child Health, Growth and Development at the Faculty of Medicine, Sigmund Freud Private University, head of the International LCH Study Centre at St. Anna Children's Cancer Research Institute, and President of the European Consortium for Histiocytosis.

== Early life and education ==
Minkov was born in Dalbok Dol, Bulgaria. He graduated with honors and received his medical degree from the Russian State Medical University in 1991. He completed his residency and fellowship in pediatrics and pediatric hematology (1991-1995) at the Russian Federal Institute for Pediatric Hematology, Immunology, and Oncology in Moscow. He was trained in pediatric hematology/oncology (1995-2000) by Professor Helmut Gadner at St. Anna Children’s Hospital in Vienna.

== Career ==
Minkov has been actively involved in managing pediatric patients with LCH and has also been a key figure in developing international treatment protocols for LCH. His work has helped improve the survival rates of children with LCH worldwide. In addition, he has been involved in clinical trials and research studies related to pediatric oncology. He has contributed significantly to developing novel treatment strategies for children with blood disorders and cancer. He leads the LCH-Studies at St. Anna Children's Cancer Research Institute, Vienna as Chair of the International LCH Study Reference Center and PI of the LCH-IV Clinical Trial. He runs a private practice that specializes in general pediatrics, pediatric hematology and cancer aftercare in Strasshof an der Nordbahn, Lower Austria.

Minkov is recognized for his contributions to Pediatric Hematology and Oncology. He is particularly noted for his pioneering work in the treatment of histiocytic disorders, especially Langerhans Cell Histiocytosis (LCH).

Since 1991, Minkov has provided clinical care, supervised trainees, and conducted clinical research. He has been the medical director of the Departments of Neonatology, Pediatrics, and Adolescent Medicine of the Rudolfstiftung Hospital (2012-2019) and the Clinic Floridsdorf (2019-2023) of the Vienna Hospital Association.

Between 1997 and 2023, he taught and mentored medical students at the Medical University of Vienna (Assistant Professor 1997-2007, Assoc. Professor 2007-2012, and Professor of Pediatrics since 2012). In 2017, Sigmund Freud University in Vienna appointed him a full professor of specialized pediatrics.

Since March 2023, Minkov has headed the Center for Child Health, Growth, and Development at the same university. He also served as a mentor at the Open Medical Institute of the American Austrian Foundation from 2013 to 2023.

His research has focused on LCH and other histiocytoses. His scientific treatise encompasses over 150 peer-reviewed papers and nine book chapters. He was president of the Histiocyte Society from 2016 to 2019 and is currently president of the European Consortium for Histiocytosis (ECHO). He is a member of several professional societies and networks and a medical advisor of patient and parent organizations.

Minkov has written book chapters and consensus papers and also published numerous peer-reviewed articles relating to his field of research in medical journals such as Pediatric Blood & Cancer and Haematologica.

== Awards and recognition ==
- Awarded the title of University Professor by the Medical University of Vienna, 2012
- Awarded the title Honored Professor of the Federal Research and Clinical Center of Pediatric Hematology, Oncology, and Immunology, Moscow, Russia, 2016.
- Histiocyte Society Golden Pin Award 2024
