= Woodgate =

Woodgate may refer to:

== Locations ==
- Woodgate, Birmingham, West Midlands, England
- Woodgate, Cumbria, England
- Woodgate, Devon, a location in England
- Woodgate, Indiana, United States
- Woodgate, Leicestershire, England
- Woodgate, New York, United States
- Woodgate, Norfolk, a location in England
- Woodgate, Queensland, Australia
- Woodgate, West Sussex, in Aldingbourne, England
- Woodgate, Worcestershire, a location in England

== People ==
- Agustina Woodgate (born 1981), Argentinian artist
- Clare Woodgate (born 1975), Birth name and original stage name of actress Georgina Cates
- Daniel Woodgate (born 1960), Drummer of the band, Madness
- Edward Woodgate (1845–1900), British general
- Jonathan Woodgate (born 1980), English footballer
- Leslie Woodgate (1900–1961), English choral conductor
- Roberta Woodgate (born 1956), Canadian nurse and academic
- Terry Woodgate (1919–1985), English footballer
- Thomas Woodgate (1857–1929), English cricketer
- Walter Bradford Woodgate, (1841–1920), British lawyer and oarsman
