= Hans Hartung =

German-French painter

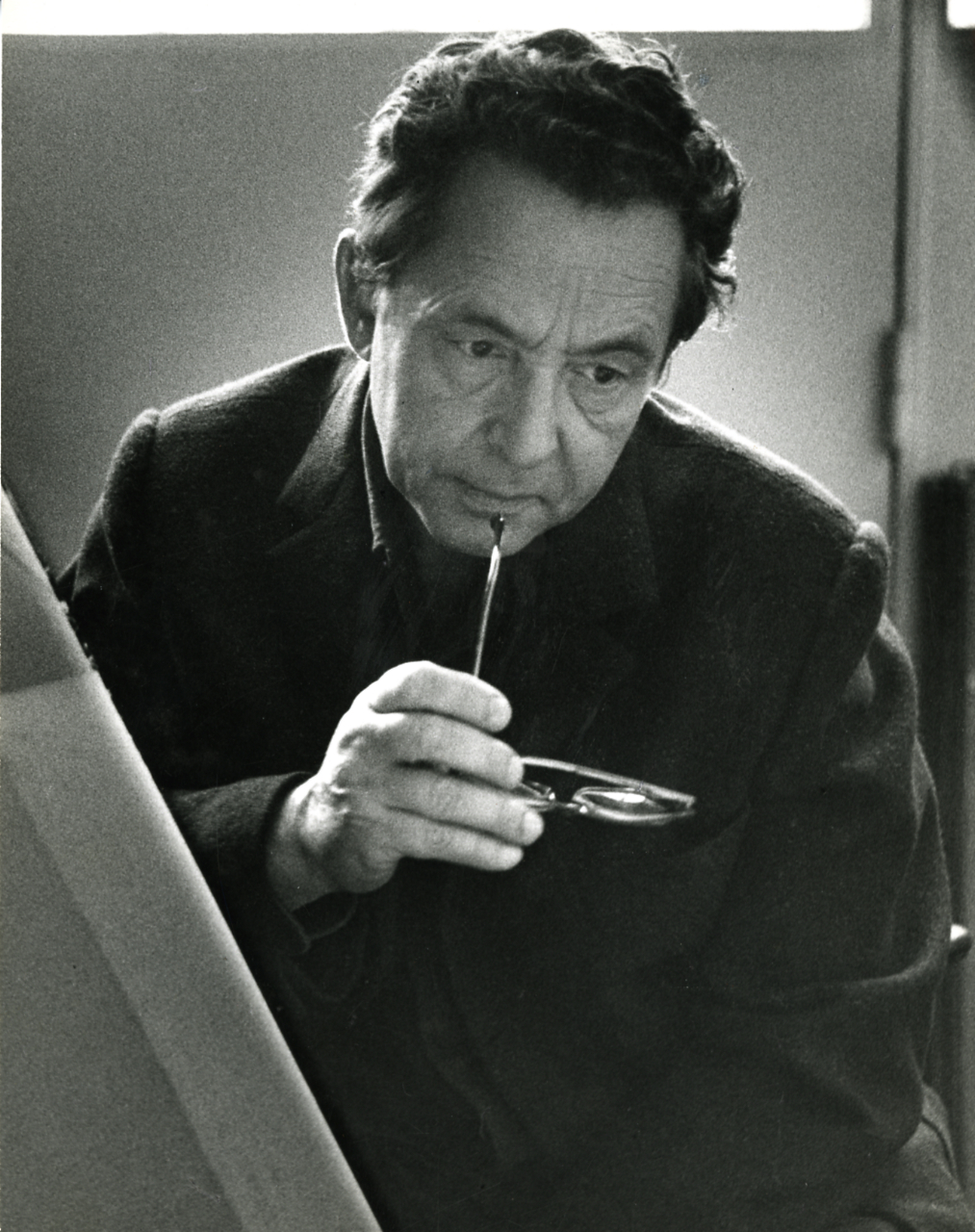
- Hans Hartung, photo by Paolo Monti, 1960 (Fondo Paolo Monti, BEIC)
- Born: 21 September 1904; Leipzig, German Empire
- Died: 7 December 1989 (aged 85); Antibes, France
- Movement: Tachism, Lyrical Abstraction
- Awards: Venice Biennale Grand Prix

Hans Hartung (21 September 1904 – 7 December 1989) was a German-French painter, known for his gestural abstract style. He was also a decorated World War II veteran of the Legion d'honneur.

== Life ==
Hartung was born in Leipzig, Germany, into an artistic family. He developed an early appreciation of Rembrandt, German painters such as Lovis Corinth, and the Expressionists Oskar Kokoschka and Emil Nolde. In 1924, he enrolled in Leipzig University, where he studied philosophy and art history. He subsequently studied at the Fine Arts academy of Dresden, where he copied the paintings of the masters. The modern French and Spanish works he saw in 1926 at the Internationale Kunstausstellung in Dresden were a revelation to him, and he decided that he would leave his native country to prevent succumbing to provincialism. Consequently, after a bicycle trip through Italy, he moved to Paris.

In Paris, Hartung had little contact with other artists and copied the works of old and modern masters. He visited the south of France, where the landscape inspired him to a close study of the works of Cézanne, and he developed a great interest in principles of harmony and proportion such as the golden section. In 1928 he visited Munich where he studied painting technique with Max Doerner. In 1929, he married the artist Anna-Eva Bergman and established himself in the French towns of Leucate, and then in the Spanish Balearic Islands, eventually settling in Menorca. He exhibited for the first time in 1931 in Dresden.

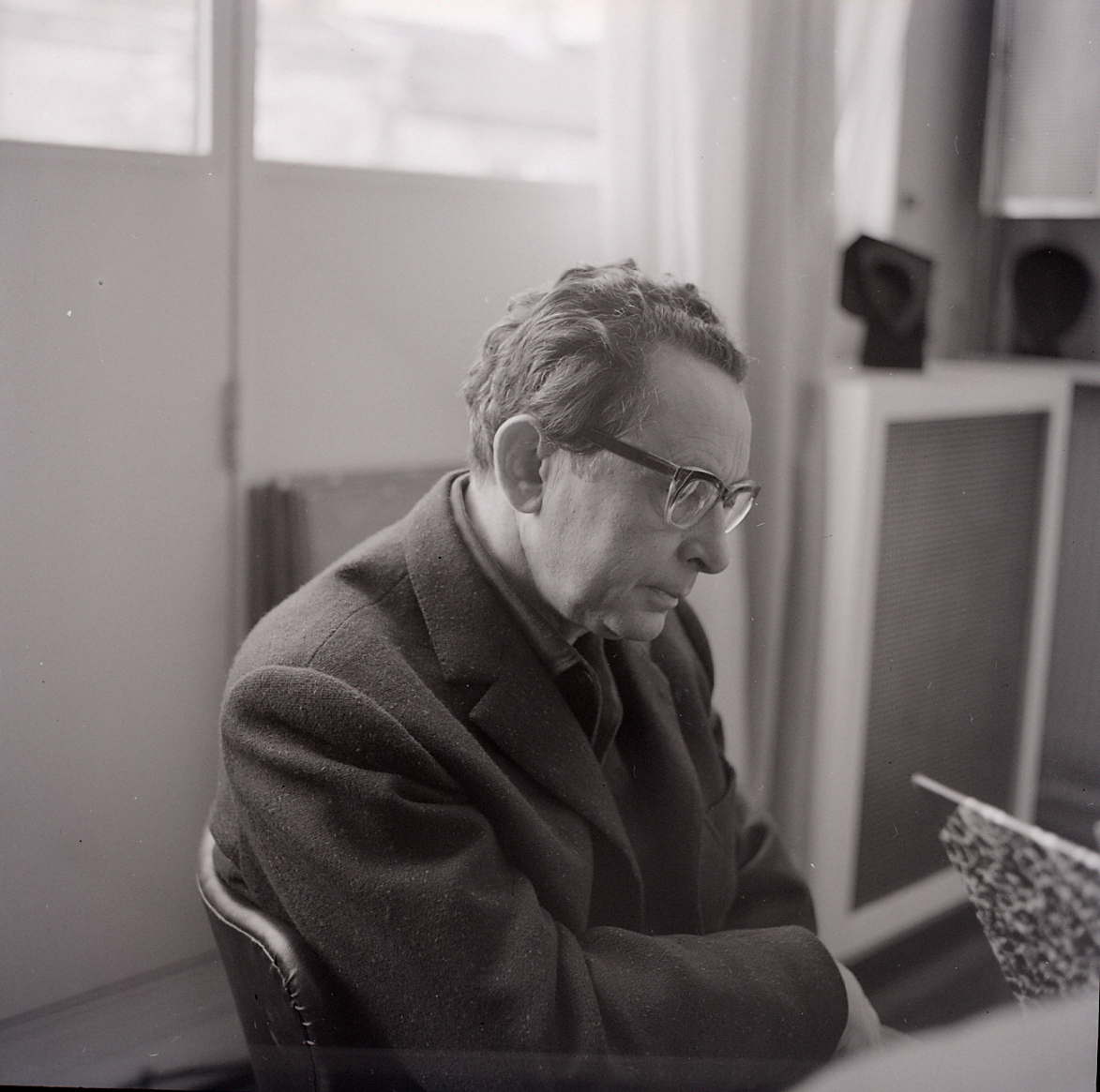
Hans Hartung, 1955. Photo by Paolo Monti, 1955 (Fondo Paolo Monti, BEIC)

The death of his father in 1932 severed Hartung's last bonds with Germany. He was rejected from Nazi Germany on account of being a 'degenerate', because his painting style was associated with Cubism – an art movement incompatible with Nazi Germany's ideals. In 1935, when he attempted to sell paintings while visiting Berlin, the police tried to arrest him. He was able to flee the country with the help of his friend Christian Zervos.

After he returned to Paris as a refugee, Hartung and his wife divorced, and he became depressed. His paintings were becoming more abstract and did not sell well. His friends tried to help him with his financial difficulties, and the sculptor Julio González offered him the use of his studio. In 1939 Hartung married González's daughter Roberta.

In December 1939, he became a member of the French Foreign Legion. He was closely followed by the Gestapo and arrested for seven months by the French police. After they learned he was a painter, he was put in a red cell in an attempt to disturb his vision. After being released he rejoined the Legion to fight in North Africa, losing a leg in a battle near Belfort. He earned French citizenship in 1945, and was awarded the Croix de Guerre.

In 1947, in Paris he had his first solo exhibition. By the late 1950s, he had achieved recognition for his gestural paintings, which were nearly monochromatic and characterized by configurations of long rhythmical brushstrokes or scratches. In 1960, he was awarded the International Grand Prix for painting at the Venice Biennale. In 1957, Hans Hartung was the first painter to receive the Rubens Prize of the City of Siegen.

Hartung's freewheeling abstract paintings set influential precedents for many younger American painters of the 1960s, making him an important forerunner of American Lyrical Abstraction of the 1960s and 1970s. He was featured in the 1963 film documentary School of Paris: (5 Artists at Work) by American filmmaker Warren Forma.

In 1957, Hartung and Anna-Eva Bergman remarried. He died on 7 December 1989, in Antibes, France.

== Exhibitions ==
- 2012: Hans Hartung Paintings 1960's–1970's, De Sarthe Gallery, Hong Kong (February 16 – April 13, 2012)
- 2017-2018: Hans Hartung (1904-1989) Abstraction: A Human Language, De Sarthe Gallery, Hong Kong (November 25, 2017 – January 20, 2018)

== See also ==
- Tachisme
- School of Paris
- L'Art Informel
- Union des Artistes Allemands Libres
