= Roberta Gottlieb =

American oncologist

Roberta Anne Gottlieb
- Occupations: Oncologist, academic, and researcher
- Known for: Research on mitophagy and mitochondrial biogenesis
- Awards: Women Who Mean Business Award, San Diego Business Journal; Fellow, International Society for Heart Research (FISHR); Fellow of the American Heart Association (FAHA); Dorothy and E. Phillip Lyon Endowed Chair in Molecular Cardiology

Academic background
- Education: The Johns Hopkins University School of Medicine

Academic work
- Institutions: University of California, Los Angeles; Cedars-Sinai Medical Center

Roberta Anne Gottlieb is an American oncologist, academic, and researcher. She is a Professor, and Vice-Chair of Translational Medicine in the Department of Biomedical Sciences at Cedars-Sinai Medical Center, and a Professor of Medicine at the University of California, Los Angeles.

Gottlieb published over 150 papers and has 6 patents awarded. Her research primarily focuses on the molecular basis of myocardial ischemia/reperfusion injury and on developing ways to mitigate damage. She has given over 200 invited talks both at scientific conferences, professional organizations and for the general public.

Gottlieb is a Fellow of the International Society for Heart Research (FISHR), and the American Heart Association (FAHA), and was the Founder and CEO of Radical Therapeutix, from 2005 till 2014, and Co-Founder and Scientific Advisory Board Co-Chair, TissueNetix, from 2011 till 2018.

== Education ==
Gottlieb received her B.A. degree from the Johns Hopkins University in 1980, and her M.D. degree from The Johns Hopkins University School of Medicine in 1984. She completed her Residency in Pediatrics at the University of Texas Health Science Center in 1987, and her Fellowship in Pediatric Hematology & Oncology at the University of Texas M.D. Anderson Cancer Center in 1990. Following this, she became a Postdoctoral Fellow in Michael Karin's lab at the University of California San Diego School of Medicine until 1992, and at The Scripps Research Institute in the lab of Bernard Babior until 1995.

== Career ==
Gottlieb began her career as a Research Biochemist in the Department of Veterans Affairs Medical Center, San Diego in 1994. During this appointment, she also held concurrent appointments at Scripps Research Institute as an Assistant Member in the Department of Molecular and Experimental Medicine in 1995, and as an Associate Member from 1997 till 1998. In 1997, she was appointed as an Adjunct Assistant Professor in the Department of Medicine University of California San Diego School of Medicine, and from 1999 to 2006, she served at Scripps Research Institute as an Associate Professor in the Department of Molecular and Experimental Medicine. Gottlieb was appointed as the Director of San Diego State University BioScience Center from 2007 till 2013. Since 2013, she has been serving as a Research Scientist IV, and a Professor of Cardiology and Biomedical Sciences at Cedars-Sinai Medical Center, and as a Professor of Medicine at the University of California Los Angeles. At Cedars-Sinai Medical Center, she serves as the Director of Metabolism and Mitochondrial Research Core, as Curriculum Director for CSMC Clinical Scholars Program, and as Vice-Chair of Translational Medicine in the Department of Biomedical Sciences. Gottlieb retired from full-time research in March, 2022, but remains involved in several ongoing collaborations.

== Research ==
Gottlieb leads ongoing research focused on autophagy, mitophagy and biogenesis, with particular attention to the molecular basis of myocardial ischemia/reperfusion injury and in developing ways to mitigate damage. Her current projects are focused on the development of small-molecular cardioprotective agents for the treatment of reperfusion injury, mitochondria and stem cells in anthracycline-induced heart failure, rescue and role of complex I in myocardial ischemic injury, and microbial basis of cardiovascular disease.

=== Molecular Basis of Myocardial Ischemia/Reperfusion Injury ===
In 1994, Gottlieb described the occurrence of programmed cell death (apoptosis) in the ischemic and reperfused heart, and highlighted that programmed cell death taking place during reperfusion is a regulated process that might be blocked to salvage myocardium. Her subsequent work has explored the role of proteases and mitochondrial dysfunction in ischemia/reperfusion injury, and most recently, the importance of autophagy in mitigating reperfusion injury. She has developed tools and techniques in her lab for studying autophagy in cells and in ex vivo and in vivo models.

Gottlieb was the first to suggest that autophagy served a protective role in the setting of myocardial stress. These concepts, tools, and approaches have extended beyond the cardiac field and have led to novel findings in the fields of infectious disease, diabetes, and neurology. Current efforts in her lab are focused on autophagic clearance of mitochondria and mitochondrial biogenesis as essential elements of cardioprotection; efficient removal of damaged mitochondria is important for limiting inflammation mediated by damage associated molecular pattern receptors. In another study, she examined the effect of impaired autophagy on cardioprotection, and the Program Project Grant was focused on the impacts of age and obesity. Her current work is focused on mitophagy and mitochondrial biogenesis as linked processes that are tightly controlled in the heart. In 2018, she with the collaboration of Jennifer Van Eyk, developed polysome profiling and azidohomoalanine labeling to interrogate the newly-synthesized proteome. They also developed advanced proteomic methods to interrogate mitochondria (Mitoplex) and to image mitochondrial turnover (MitoTimer). In 2017, her research identified a new potential way to help cardiac muscle recover from procedures, and revealed that cardiomyocytes can be damaged by the process of stopping and starting the heart during surgeries that use cardiopulmonary bypass machines to take over the heart's functions.

Gottlieb has been at the leading edge of research on mitochondria in cardiac homeostasis, which led her into the study of autophagy and mitophagy including being the first to demonstrate the critical role of Parkin in clearing damaged mitochondria during ischemic stress. Her work, in collaboration with cardiac surgeon Robert M. Mentzer, Jr., has extended to human studies, further validating the importance of Parkin in the human heart.

=== Role of Autophagy and Mitophagy in Pancreatitis ===
Gottlieb has worked to determine the role of autophagy and mitophagy in pancreatitis. She initially studied cerulein-induced pancreatitis and now has expanded the focus to pancreatitis induced by ethanol and cigarette smoke. This work is done in collaboration with Honit Piplani and Stephen Pandol. In 2019, she highlighted how simvastatin induces autophagic flux to restore cerulein-impaired phagosome-lysosome fusion in acute pancreatitis, and also discussed the role of simvastatin in enhancing autophagic flux to prevent pancreatic cell injury and pancreatitis. She also contributed to a SEER-Medicare analysis focusing on the association of statin use after cancer diagnosis with survival in pancreatic cancer patients, and found out that statin treatment after cancer diagnosis is associated with enhanced survival in patients with low-grade, resectable PDAC.

== Awards/honors ==
- 1990 - Fellowship, Cancer Research Foundation of America
- 1991-93 - Physician Postdoctoral Fellowship, Howard Hughes Medical Institute
- 1994-95 - Minority Scientist Development Award, American Heart Association
- 1996-98 - Clinical Investigator Award, National Institutes of Health
- 1997-99 - Junior Faculty Scholar Award, American Society of Hematology
- 1997-2001 - Pew Scholars Program in the Biomedical Sciences
- 2005 - Black Belt in TaeKwonDo, World Martial Arts Ranking Association
- 2009 - Best Overall, San Diego Tech Coast Angels Quick Pitch Competition
- 2012 - Women Who Mean Business Award, San Diego Business Journal
- 2009 - Fellow, International Society for Heart Research (FISHR)
- 2010 - Fellow of the American Heart Association (FAHA)
- 2014 - Dorothy and E. Phillip Lyon Endowed Chair in Molecular Cardiology

== Bibliography ==
- Gottlieb, R. A., Burleson, K. O., Kloner, R. A., Babior, B. M., & Engler, R. L. (1994). Reperfusion injury induces apoptosis in rabbit cardiomyocytes. The Journal of clinical investigation, 94(4), 1621-1628.
- Hamacher-Brady, A., Brady, N. R., & Gottlieb, R. A. (2006). Enhancing macroautophagy protects against ischemia/reperfusion injury in cardiac myocytes. Journal of Biological Chemistry, 281(40), 29776-29787.
- Huang, C., Andres, A. M., Ratliff, E. P., Hernandez, G., Lee, P., & Gottlieb, R. A. (2011). Preconditioning involves selective mitophagy mediated by Parkin and p62/SQSTM1. PloS one, 6(6), e20975.
- Andres, A. M., Tucker, K. C., Thomas, A., Taylor, D. J., Sengstock, D., Jahania, S. M., ... & Gottlieb, R. A. (2017). Mitophagy and mitochondrial biogenesis in atrial tissue of patients undergoing heart surgery with cardiopulmonary bypass. JCI insight, 2(4).
- Germano, J. D. F., Huang, C., Sin, J., Song, Y., Tucker, K. C., Taylor, D. J., ... & Andres, A. M. (2020). Intermittent use of a short-course glucagon-like peptide-1 receptor agonist therapy limits adverse cardiac remodeling via parkin-dependent mitochondrial turnover. Scientific reports, 10(1), 1-13.
