= Hera Gallery =

Artist cooperative in Rhode Island, US

Hera Gallery is a small, non-profit artist cooperative in Wakefield, Rhode Island USA. Created within the context of the feminist art movement, Hera Gallery was a pioneer in the genesis of artist-run spaces. Its founding objective in 1974 was to provide a venue for women artists, under-represented at the time in commercial galleries. As the cultural climate changed in the 1980s, the gallery broadened its scope to include visual artists of more gender identities. Concurrently, Hera curated more topical exhibitions with a broadened spectrum of social awareness and activism. To this day, the gallery provides contemporary artists with the opportunity to address cultural, social, and political issues and to maintain creative control.

== History ==
Hera Gallery was created in 1974, the year that the alternative gallery movement burst beyond major cities and into more remote locations, like Wakefield, Rhode Island. It was conceived from a consciousness-raising group consisting mostly of artists, and often associated with the nearby University of Rhode Island, that started meeting in 1969. One of the common topics to discuss were the difficulties of balancing the domestic responsibilities of being wife and mother with a professional artistic career. The women discussed the difficulty in having their work represented in Manhattan galleries, where apparent sexism from gallery owners caused their work to be disregarded. Hera Gallery was thus created in order to foster a professional community of women artists, in the vein of other recently established women-run artist cooperatives, such as New York City's A.I.R. Gallery. At the time, a Providence Journal writer commented that "...a women's art center named after a bitchy Greek goddess and housed in a barn that used to be a laundry is New England's only art gallery completely owned and controlled by women..."

The gallery continues to host topical exhibitions. Their 2022 exhibition, "Erosion," highlighted artist's emotional responses to the 2022 U.S. Supreme Court Case, Dobbs v. Jackson Women's Health Organization. The gallery also hosts community outreach programs; from September 2020 to June 2021 the gallery ran the program The Green Stitch: Knitting Community Together, in which Hera Gallery, The Rhode Island Natural History Survey, and Save the Bay RI hosted monthly environmentalist presentations and corresponding craft activities.

Photograph of Hera Gallery's exterior

== Organizational structure ==
Initially the organization of Hera Gallery consisted of non-hierarchical egalitarian committees, influenced by feminist ideals. As the gallery grew, its board of directors, once only represented by artist-members, was appended with a community Advisory Board from 1986–2000, according to the gallery's unpublished “Addendum to the History of Hera”. Furthermore, when the Advisory Board was discontinued in 2000, the Board of Directors began including external community members (Addendum). Since 1992 (Addendum) there has also been a Gallery Director part-time paid position.

Hera Gallery offers its members an annual solo exhibition, inclusion in group exhibitions, curatorial opportunities, and positions on the Board of Directors. It serves the surrounding community by “encouraging ethnic and cultural diversity in both audience and program development. ”

== Developments ==
Since its inception, Hera Gallery has resided in a building that was a garage in the 1920s, then a laundromat, and later a flea market, before finally being outfitted by the founding artists and their loved ones. Its landlord throughout this time was a sympathetic URI professor who kept the rent low for them. After his recent demise, the family put the land on the market but waited for a buyer whose plan included preserving the gallery. In September 2007 it was announced that a buyer plans on demolishing the existing building to create a mixed-use development including residential condominiums and inclusion of the gallery.

In 2022 the gallery opened their BackSpace Gallery, a space dedicated to showing experimental, multi-media, and installation art.

== Selected artists ==
- Dale Chihuly
- Judy Gelles
- Ana Mendieta
- Italo Scanga
- Carolee Schneeman
- Susan Weil
- Roberta Richman, a founding member.
