= Julio González (sculptor) =

Spanish sculptor and painter

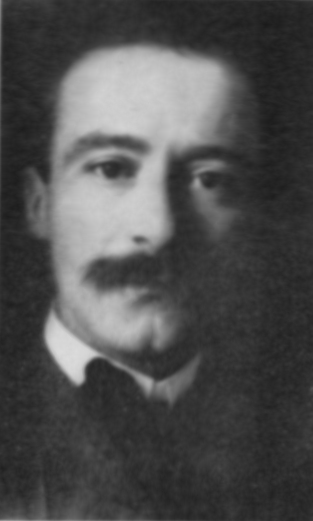
- Julio González, 1912
- Born: Julio González Pellicer; 21 September 1876; Barcelona, Spain
- Died: 27 March 1942 (aged 65); Arcueil, France
- Education: Cercle Artístic de Sant Lluc
- Known for: Painting, Sculpture
- Movement: Cubism

Julio González i Pellicer (21 September 1876 – 27 March 1942), born in Barcelona, was a Spanish sculptor and painter who developed the expressive use of iron as a medium for modern sculpture. Known as "the father of all iron sculpture of this century", he was associated with the Spanish circle of artists of Montmartre. He came from a lineage of metalsmith workers and artists.

== Biography ==
=== Early life ===
Julio González Pellicer was born in Barcelona, on September 21, 1876. He came from a line of metalsmith workers; his grandfather was a goldsmith in Galicia. González's father, Concordio González, owned a workshop and as a young boy, González learned from him the techniques of gold, silver, and iron metalwork. He and his older brother, Joan González, both studied these techniques. Further, all three González children studied at Circol Artist Sant Luc, a Catholic school that remodeled its education on the medieval art guilds, influenced by the Arts and Crafts movement in England. In 1896, González's father, died. The family workshop was passed onto the older son, Joan. With Joan directly involved with the family workshop, Joan and Julio focused on their metalwork techniques and artistic aspirations. By the end of the century, both brothers began to frequent Els Quatre Gats, a café which was the meeting point of many artists, especially those related with modernisme. It was there where they met artists like Joan Miró and Pablo Picasso.

By the turn of the 20th century, Pablo Picasso and González became great friends. González moved to Paris in 1902, but traveled to Barcelona several times in the early 20th century. At the Picasso Museum in Barcelona, their close friendship is verified by a drawn portrait, entitled "Julio González and the Robust Man Seen from Behind". They remained close friends until 1908; scholars do not know why their friendship ended at this time, but based on González archival materials, it appears to be related to an earlier dispute with Julio's brother, Joan.

=== Paris ===
In Paris he associated with the Spanish circle of artists of Montmartre, including Pablo Gargallo, Juan Gris and Max Jacob. In 1918, he developed an interest in the artistic possibilities of welding, after learning the technique whilst working in the Renault factory at Boulogne-Billancourt. This technique would subsequently become his principal contribution to sculpture, though during this period he also painted and—especially—created jewellery pieces. In 1920 he renewed his acquaintance with Picasso, for whom he later provided technical assistance in executing sculptures in iron, participating in Picasso's research on analytic cubism. He also forged the infrastructures of Constantin Brâncuși's plasters. In the winter of 1927–28, he showed Picasso how to use oxy-fuel welding and cutting. When their friendship re-established itself, Picasso and González collaborated on a piece called Woman in the Garden between 1928 and 1930. From October 1928 till 1932, both men worked together—and in 1932, González was the only artist with whom Picasso shared his own personal art notebook. Influenced by Picasso, the fifty-year-old González deeply changed his style, exchanging bronze for iron, and volumes for lines. González began to formalize a new visual language in sculpture that would change the course of his career.

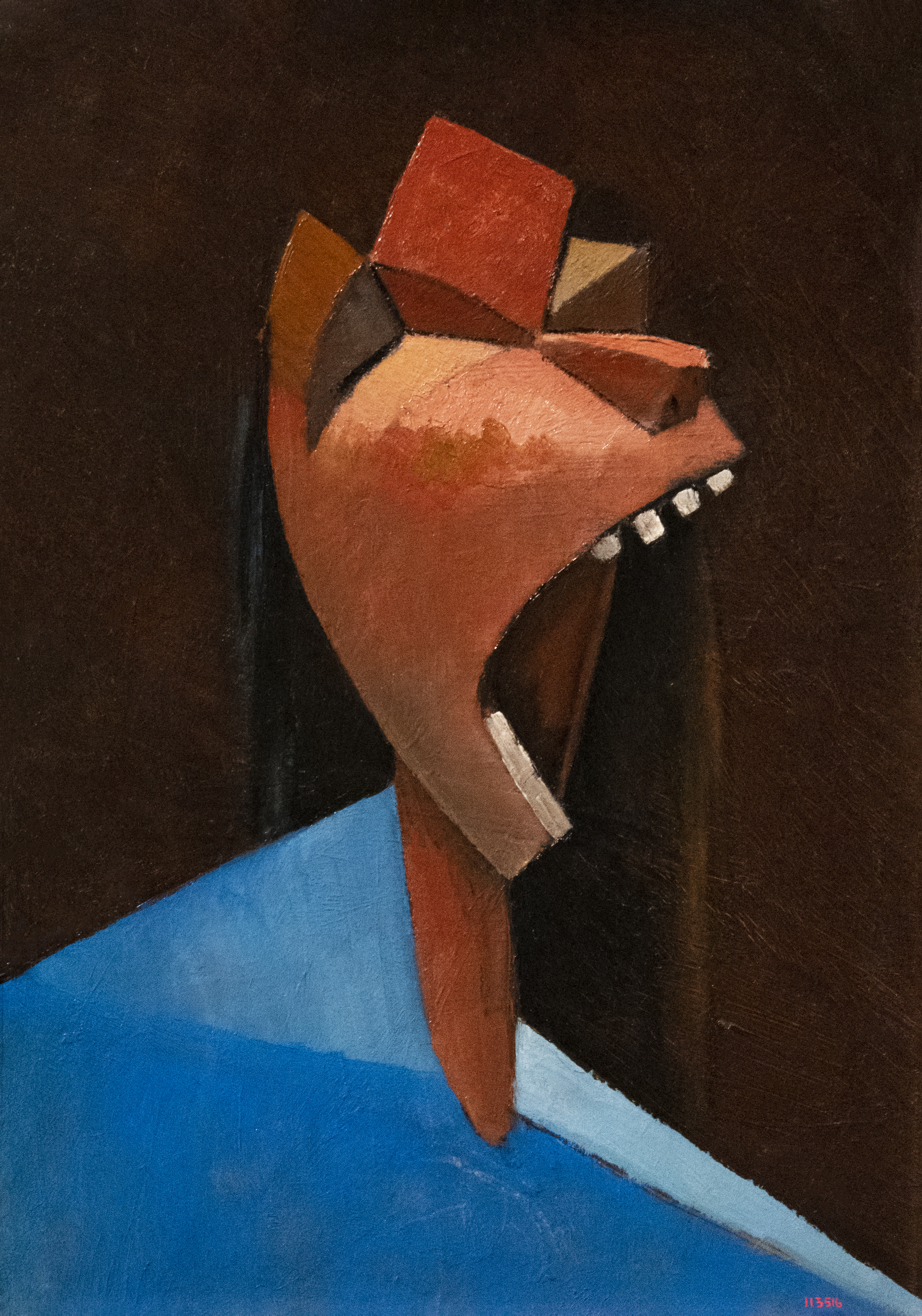
Cap cridant, Museu Nacional d'Art de Catalunya

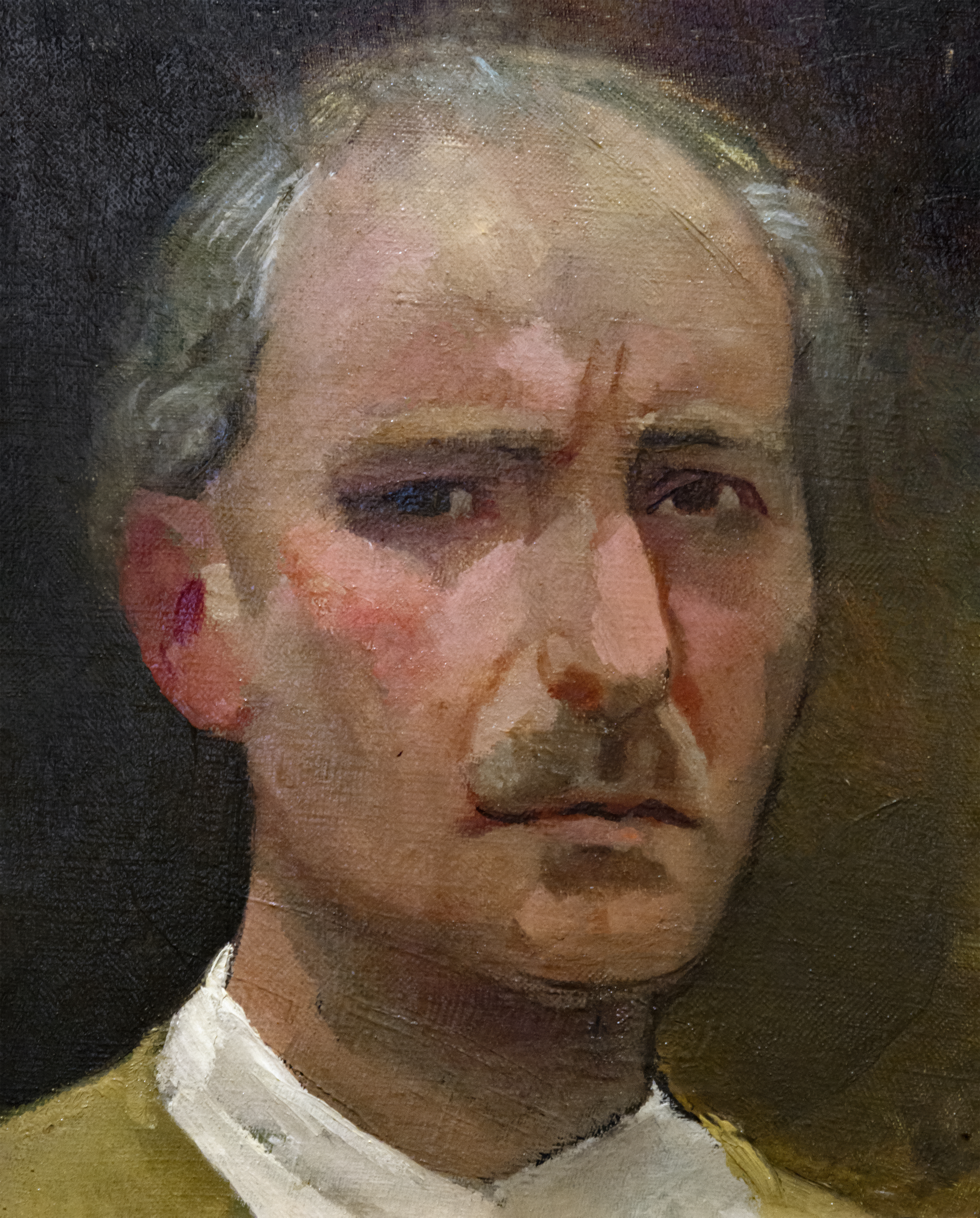
Self-portrait 1920, Museu Nacional d'Art de Catalunya

Visage criant a la grande main, 1941.

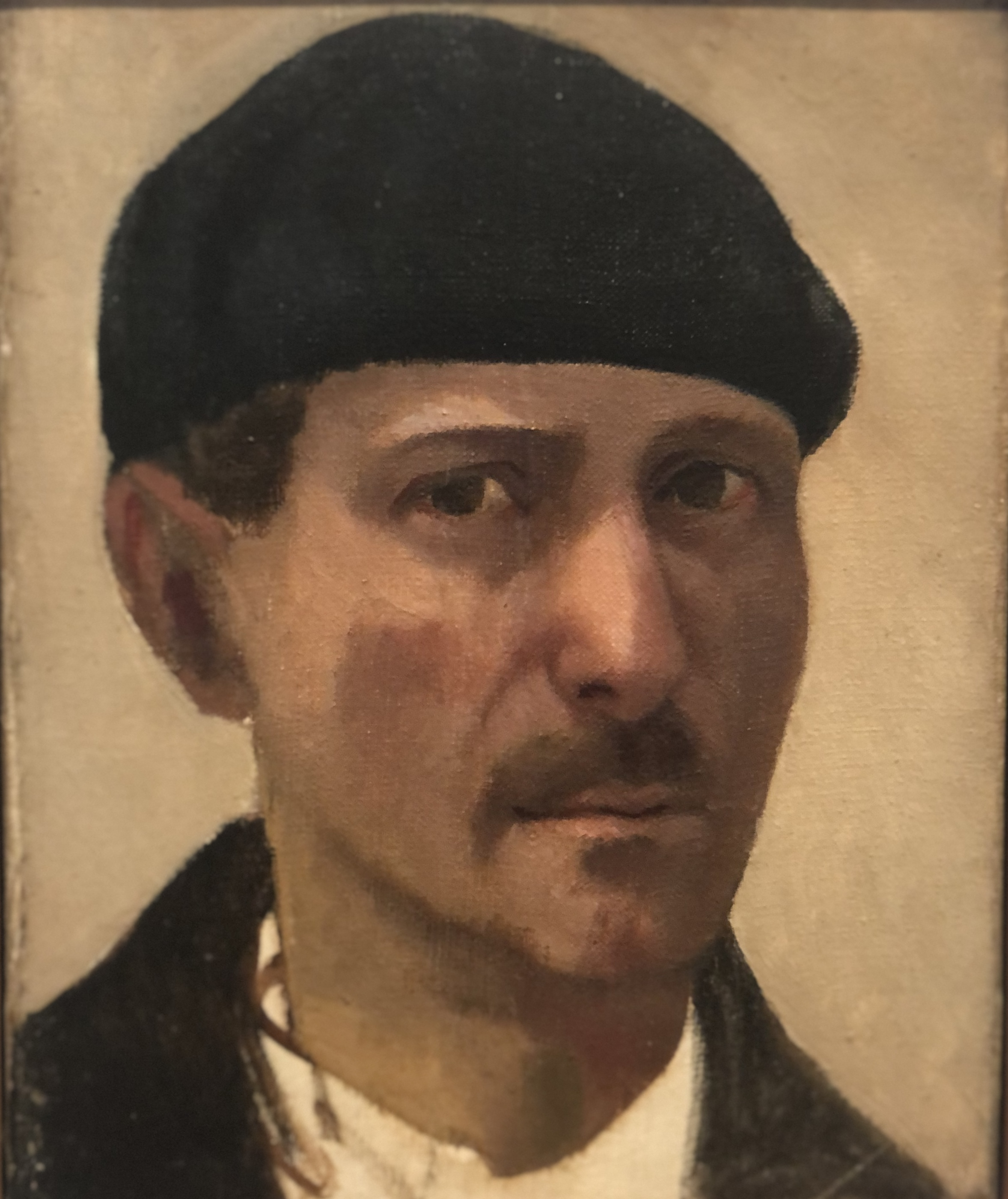
Self portrait, 1920, Institut Valencià d'Art Modern[edit]

=== Ironwork (1932–1937) ===
González created ironwork at this time that would establish him as "the father of all iron sculpture of this century". During the early 1930s, few artists utilized forged or welded metal as a potential medium for their art. This is because, at the time, many artists did not directly work with the medium. Rather, artists worked with a foundry and expert technicians to execute the works of art. González was unique in this instance because his work demanded an active interaction- something that required the skills shaped by a long and specialized apprenticeship. In 1937 he contributed to the Spanish Pavilion at the World Fair in Paris (La Montserrat, standing near Guernica), and to Cubism and Abstract Art at the Museum of Modern Art in New York.

=== Later years (1938–1942) ===
Monsieur Cactus (Cactus Man I), 1939

In the late 1930s González worked with naturalistic and abstract forms. The art he produced during this period, similar to other Spanish loyalist republican artists living abroad during the Spanish Civil War, reflected the pain and torment they felt. Significant amongst these pieces was his 1939 abstract sculpture Monsieur Cactus (Cactus Man I) which was influential on the development of avant-garde sculpture. Several of the exploratory drawings for the sculpture " .... suggest that the figure is shrieking; the prickly nails intensify the aggressive effect of the work, recalling Picasso’s use of nails in his Guitar of 1926."

As González aged between 1938 and 1940, he drew more. These later works, as scholar Joseph Withers states, "touch on larger problems and personal concerns which necessitated our discussion of these works in the context of González's evidently pessimistic reaction to the Spanish Civil War and the Second World War. González was directly affected by the Second World War; his daughter Roberta González married German painter—and Julio's assistant—Hans Hartung in 1938. When the German invasion occurred in France, the couple had to separate from the rest of the family since Hans Hartung was an anti-Nazi and was wanted by the German secret police. While separated from his daughter and son-in-law, González drew figurative drawings and worked on plaster casts. The drawings and castings produced during the last two years of his life are testimonies to the suffering and despair González felt towards tyranny and war. González died in Arcueil on March 27, 1942.

== Public collections ==
The Art Institute of Chicago, the Cleveland Museum of Art, the Hirshhorn Museum and Sculpture Garden (Washington D.C.), the Honolulu Museum of Art, the Kröller-Müller Museum (Otterlo, Netherlands), the Los Angeles County Museum of Art, the Luís Ángel Arango Library (Bogotá, Colombia), the Mary and Leigh Block Museum of Art (Northwestern University, Evanston, Illinois), Musée des Beaux-Arts de Rennes (France), Museo Nacional Centro de Arte Reina Sofía (Madrid), Museo Patio Herreriano de Valladolid (Spain), Museu Nacional d'Art de Catalunya (Barcelona, Spain), the Museum of Modern Art (New York City), the Nasher Sculpture Center (Dallas, Texas), the National Gallery of Scotland (Edinburgh), the Peggy Guggenheim Collection (Venice), the Philadelphia Museum of Art, the Pompidou Center (Paris), the Solomon R. Guggenheim Museum (New York City), and the Tate Gallery (London) are among the public collections holding work by Julio González.

The biggest collection of this artist's work is held by the IVAM (Valencia's Institute of Modern Art), in the city of Valencia, Spain, with close to 400 pieces.

== Gallery ==
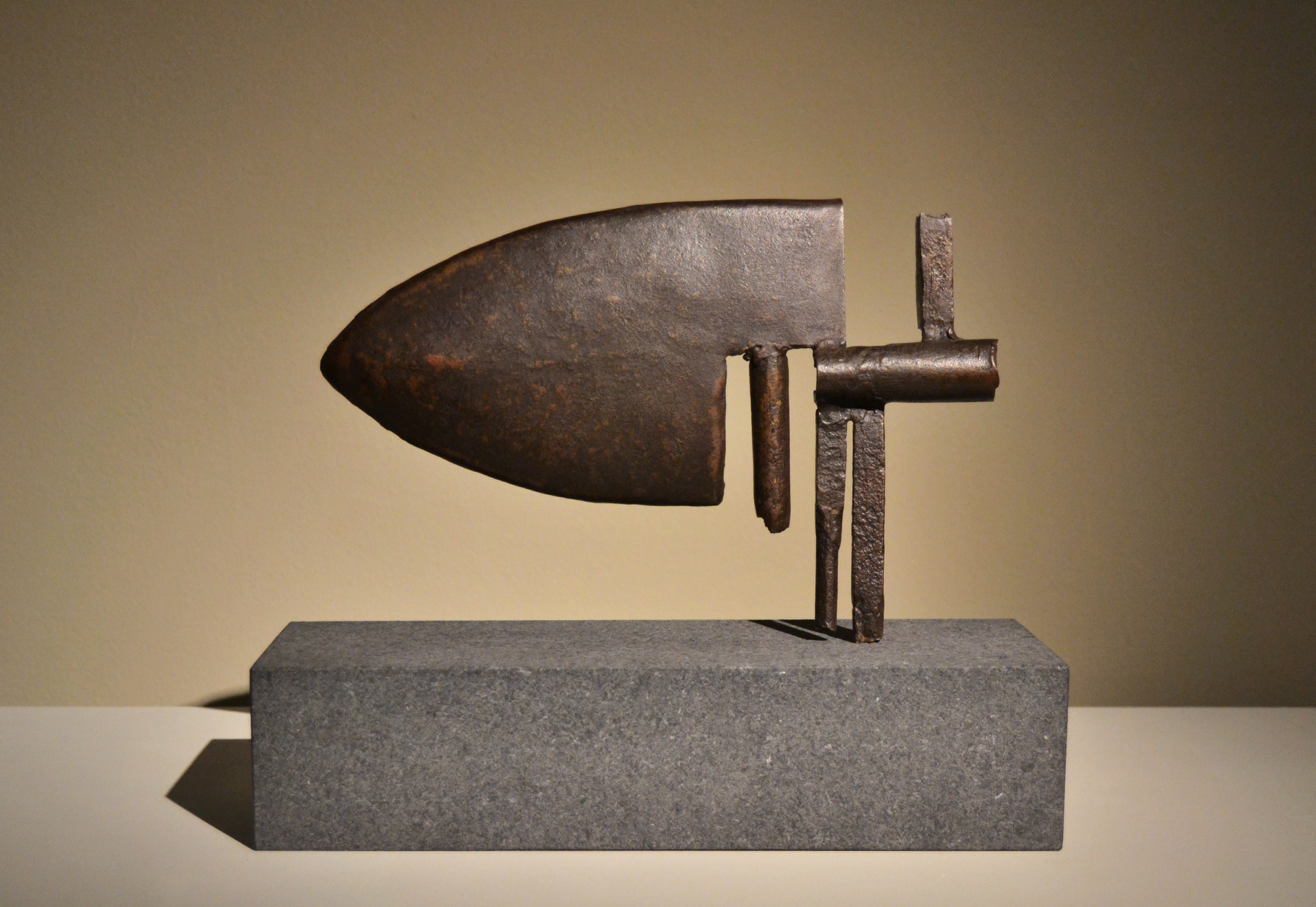
Mà gitada (Main couchée), 1937, wrought iron, 19 x 29,5 x 2,7 cm. Institut Valencià d'Art Modern

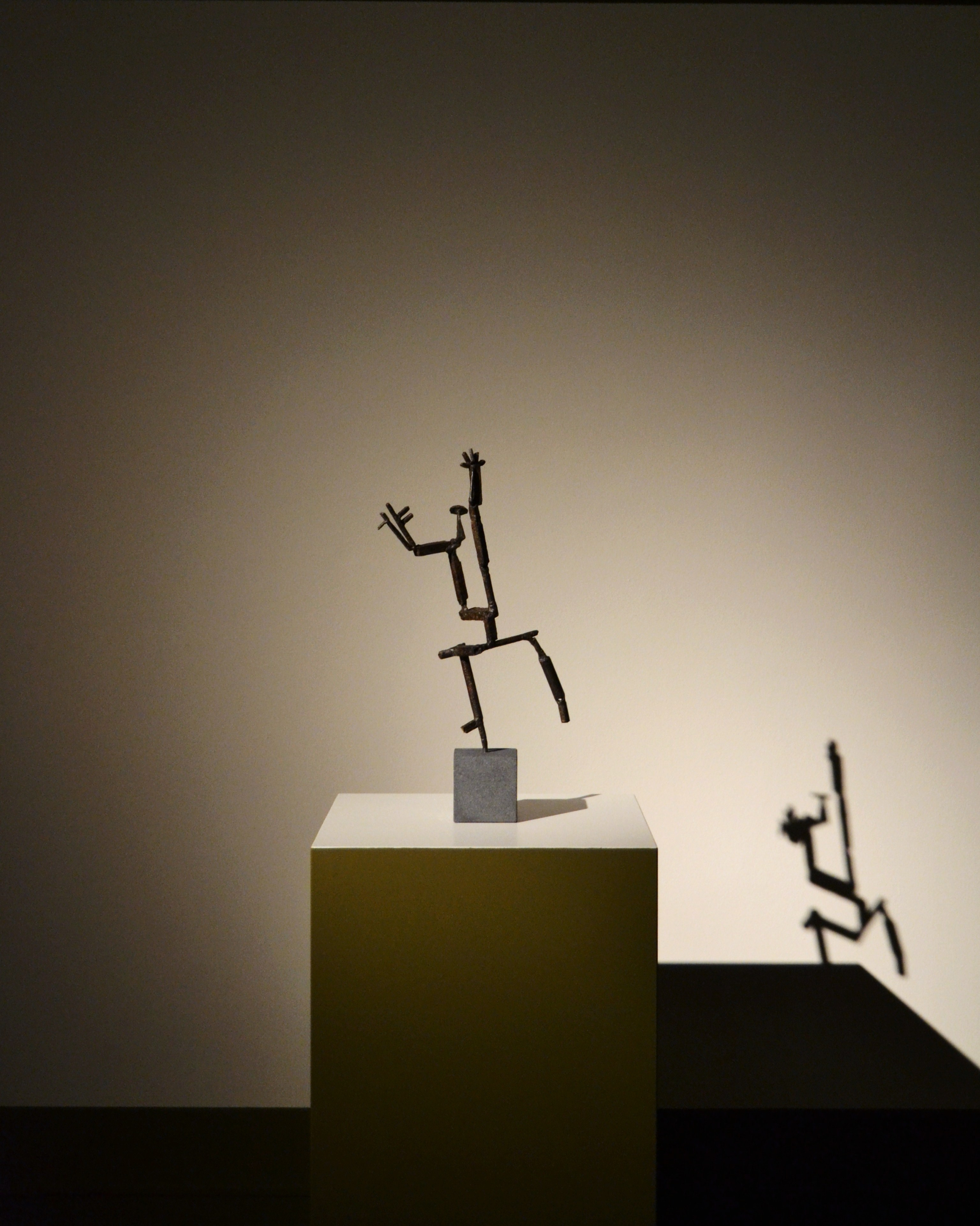
Ballarina amb margarida, (Danseuse à la marguerite), 1937, wrought iron, 48,3 x 29,2 x 10 cm, Institut Valencià d'Art Modern

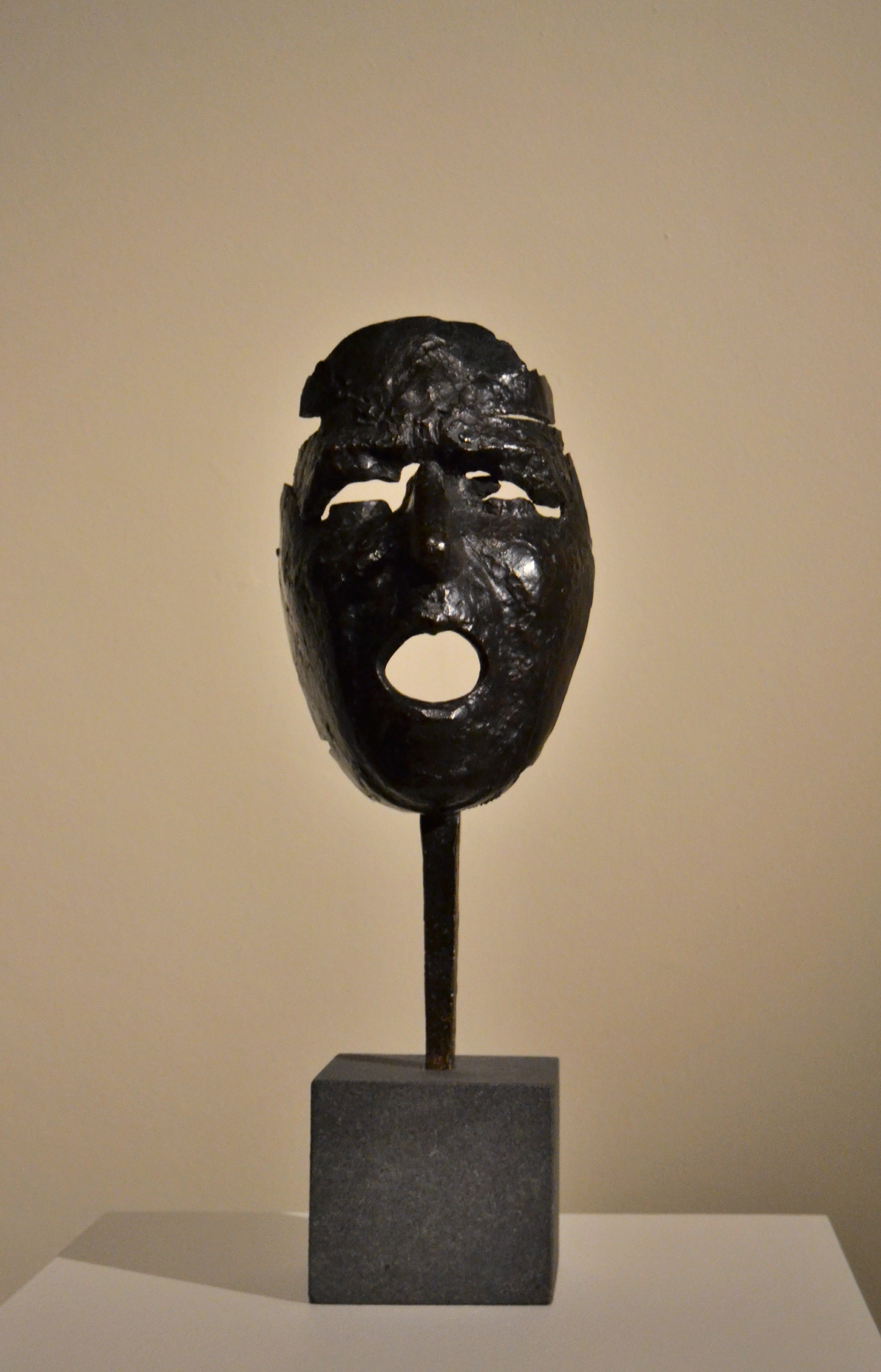
Màscara de Montserrat cridant (Masque de Montserrat criant), bronze, 32,8 x 14,9 x 12 cm, c. 1938–39, Institut Valencià d'Art Modern

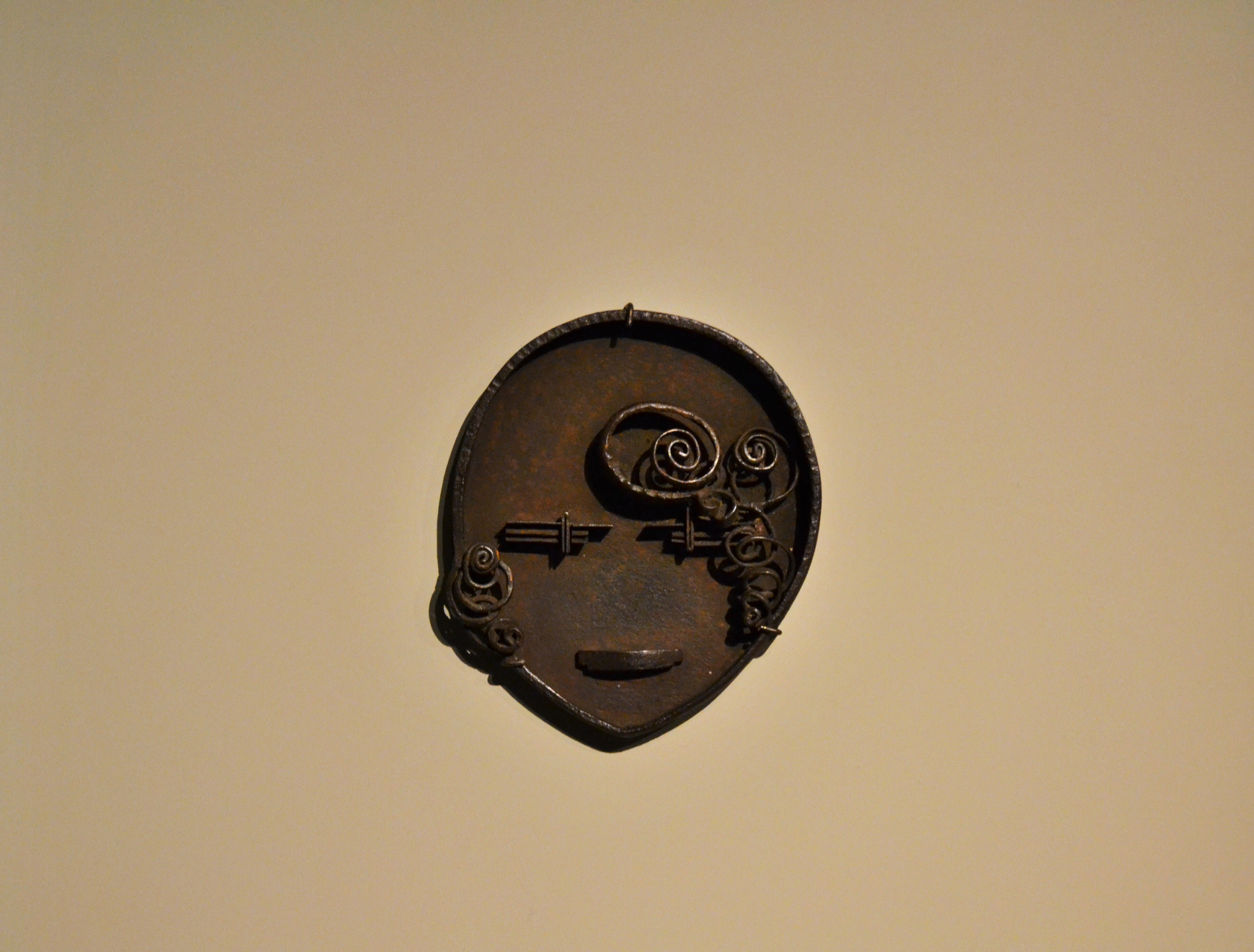
Petite masque baroque (Xicoteta màscara barroca), wrought iron, 12,5 x 11,2 x 1,8 cm, c. 1927–1929, Institut Valencià d'Art Modern

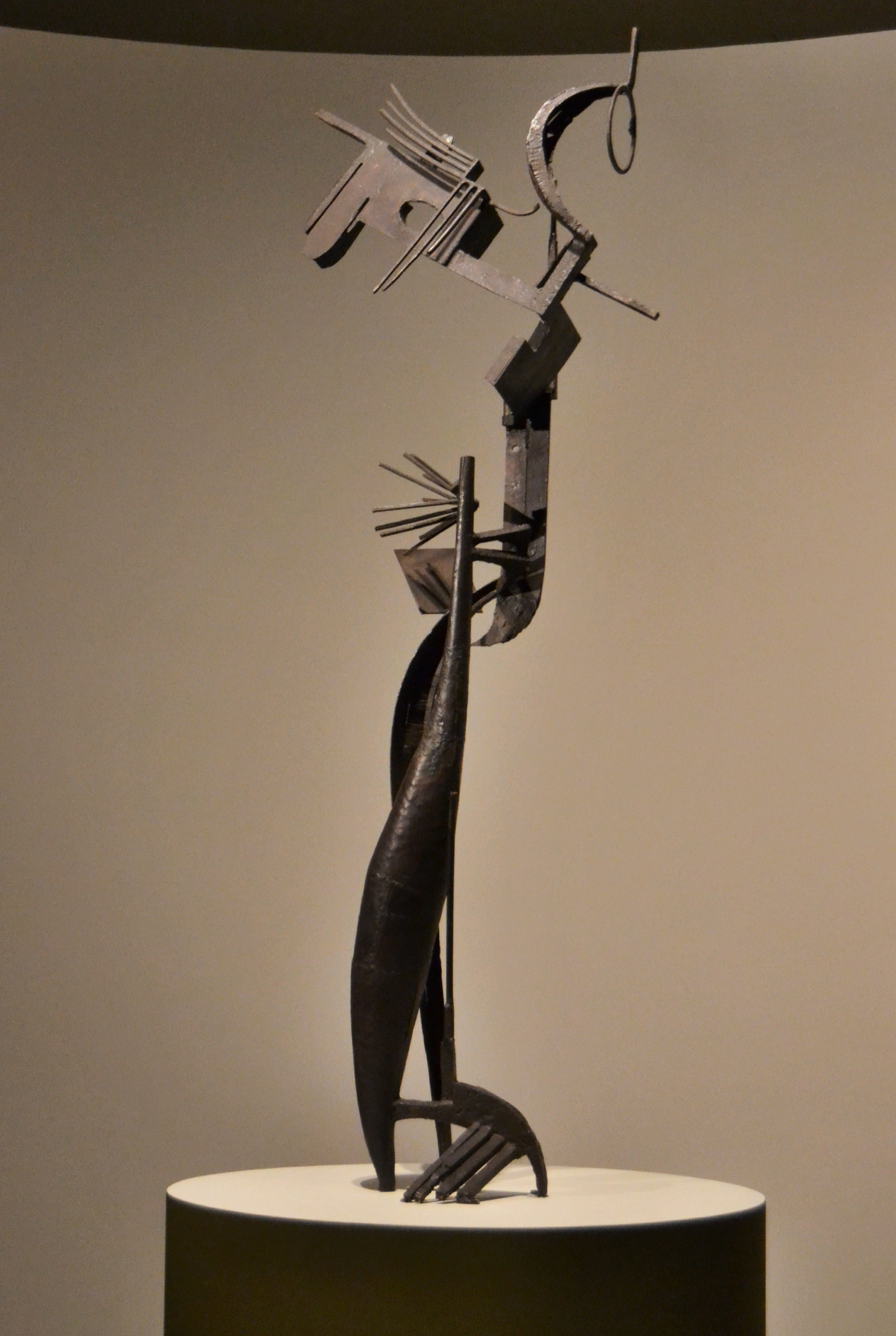
Dona davant l'espill (Femme au miroir), wrought iron, 208,8 x 60 x 46 cm, c.1936–1937, Institut Valencià d'Art Modern

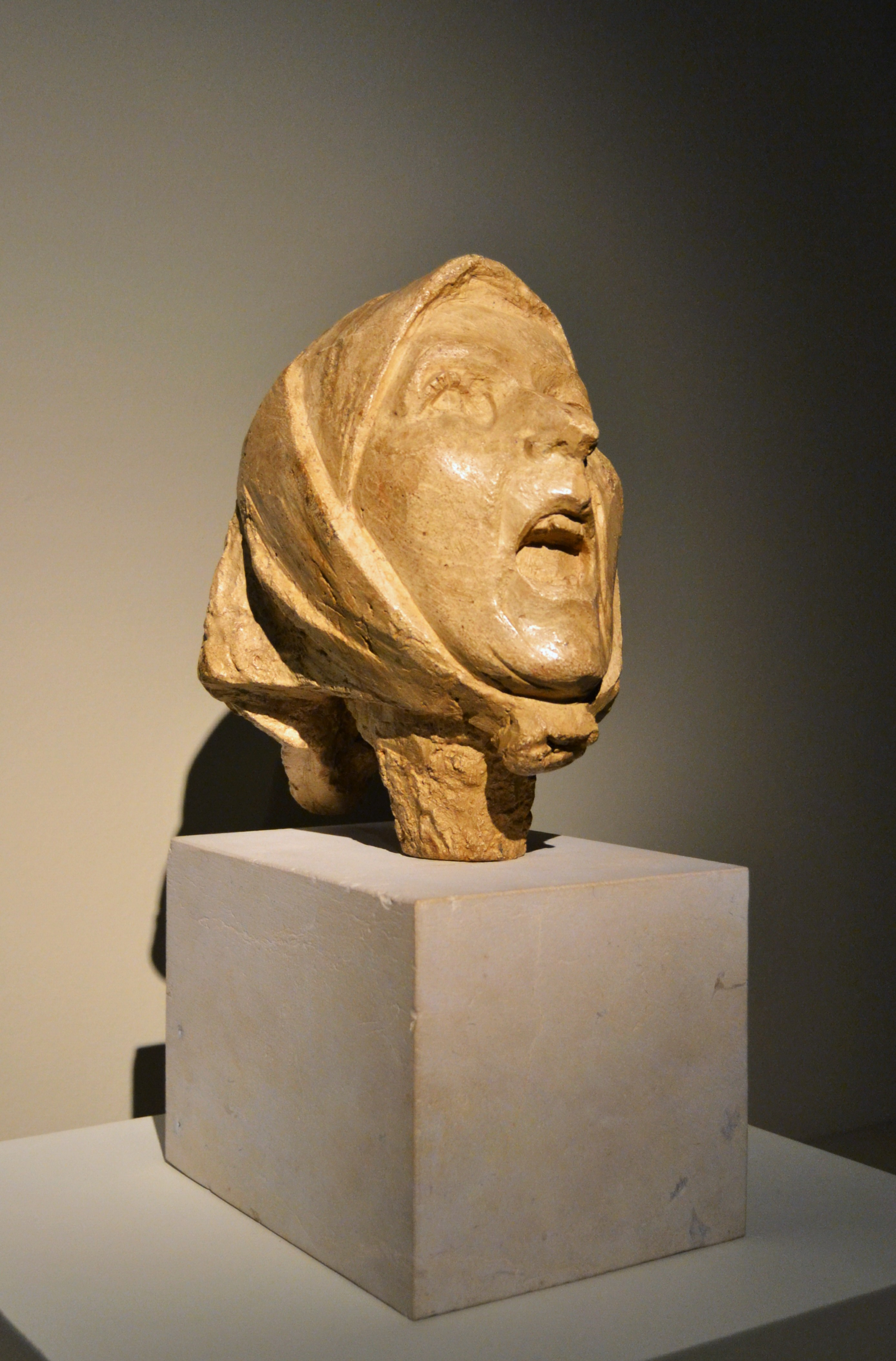
Cap de Montserrat cridant (Tête de Montserrat criant), 1942, chalk, 32 x 20 x 30 cm. Institut Valencià d'Art Modern

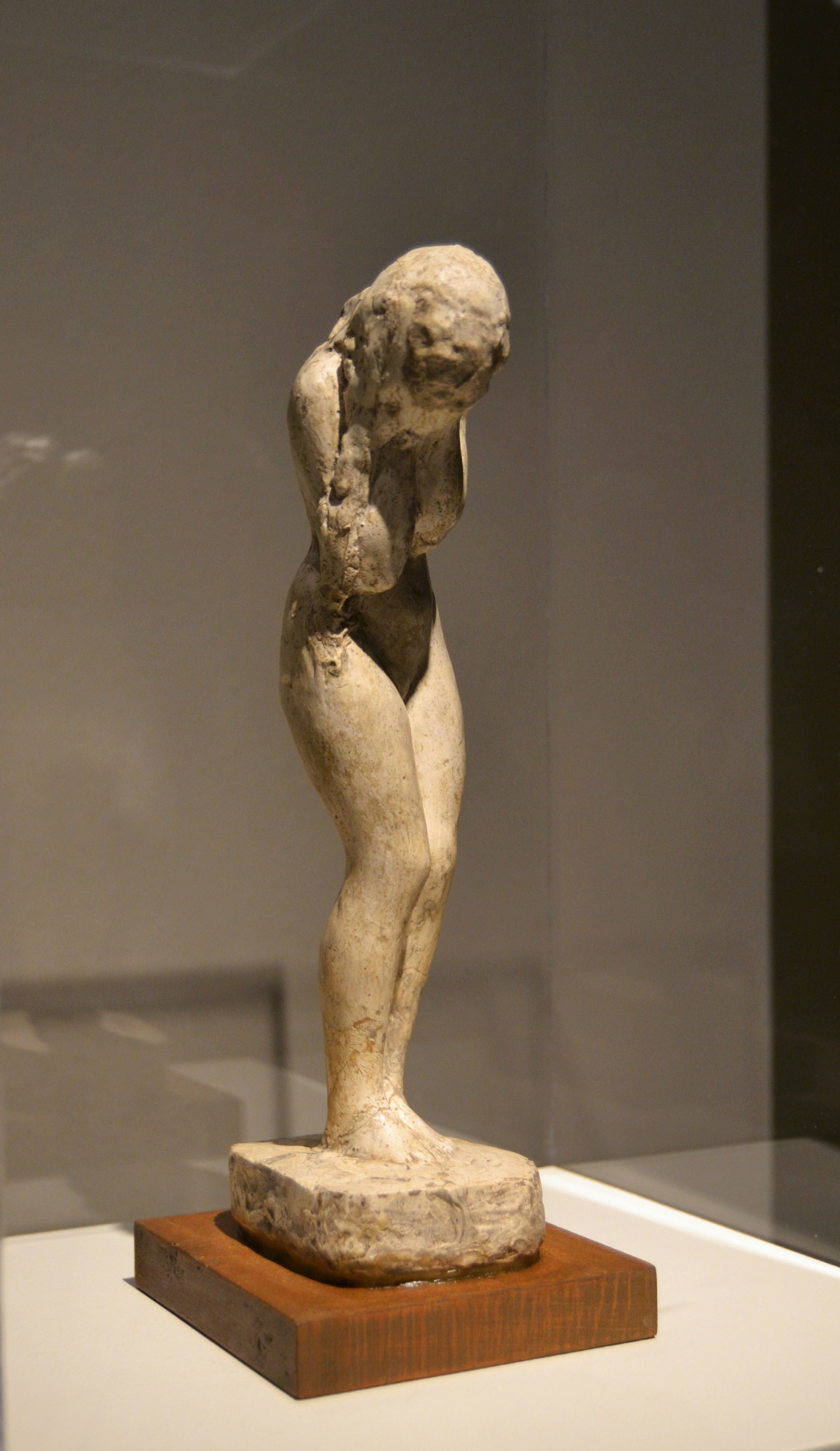
Nu dempeus melangiós (Nu debout mélancolique), c. 1910–14, chalk, 26'5 x 6'5 x 9'5 cm, Institut Valencià d'art Modern

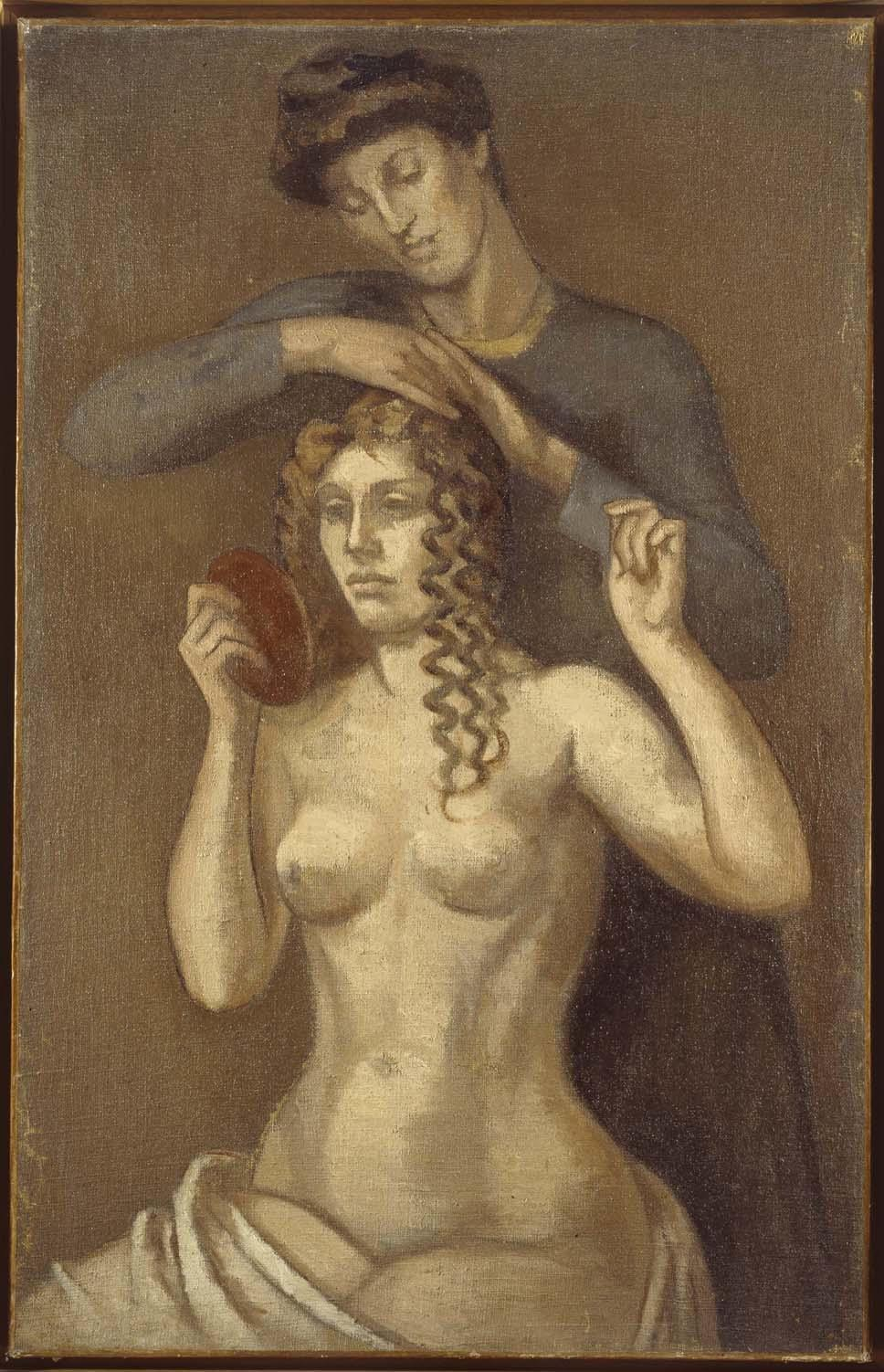
Femme coiffant une jeune fille (Mujer peinando a una joven), c. 1912–14, Museo Nacional Centro de Arte Reina Sofía, Madrid

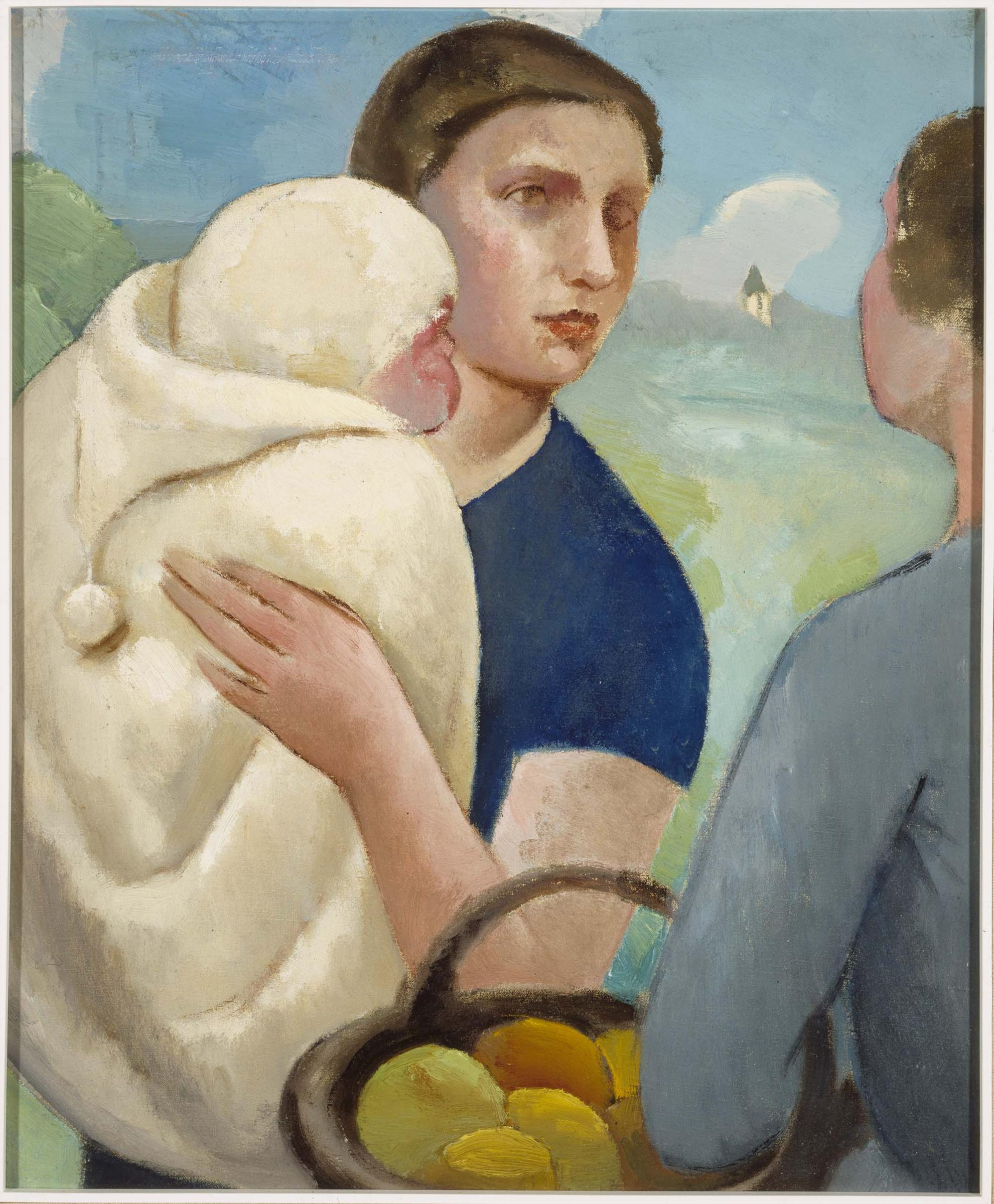
Maternité au clocher (Maternidad del campanario), c. 1920–28 Museo Nacional Centro de Arte Reina Sofía, Madrid

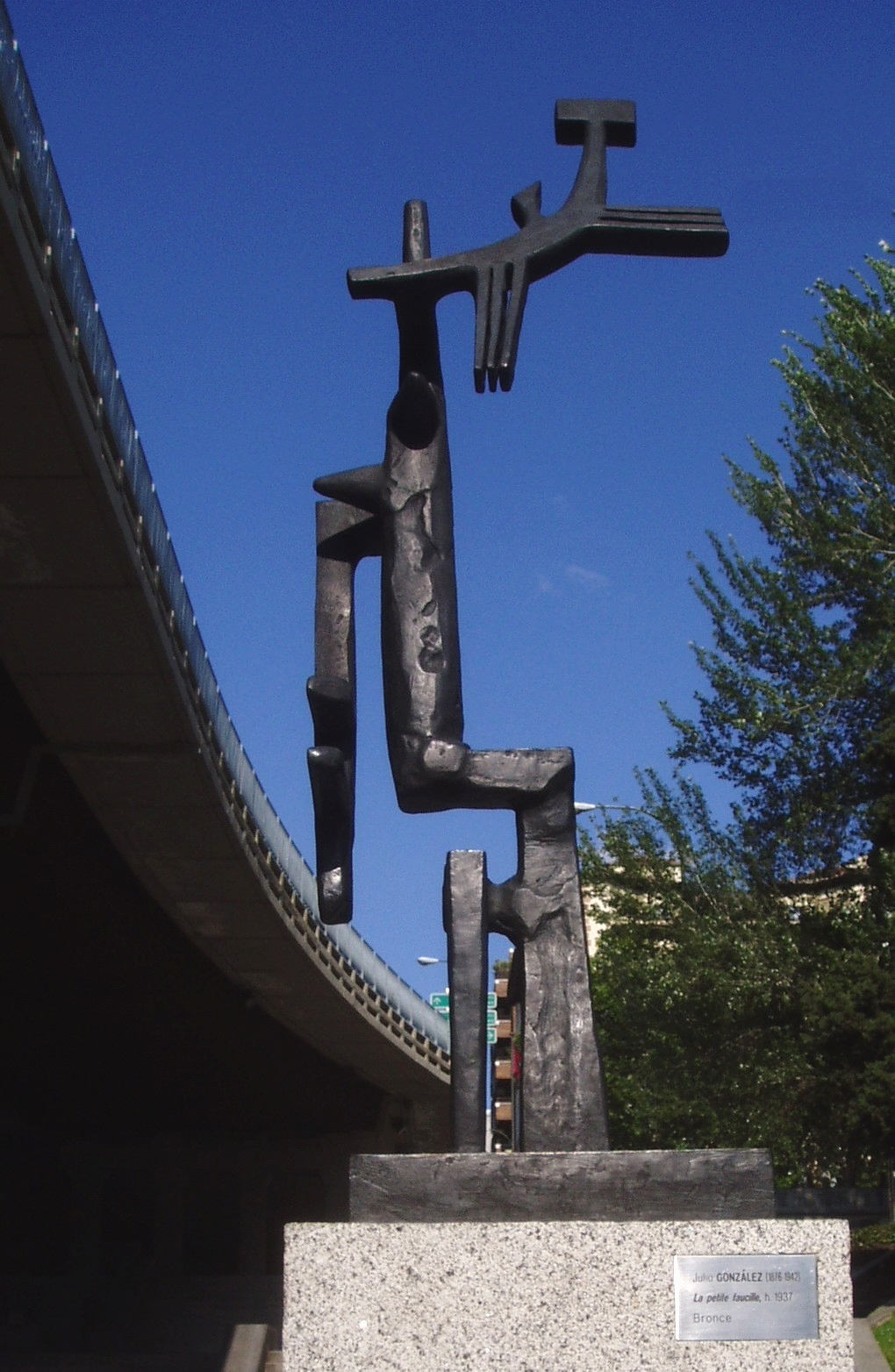
La petite faucille (La pequeña hoz), c. 1937, bronze, Museo de Escultura al Aire Libre de la Castellana, Madrid
