= Roberta Einer =

Estonian fashion designer

Roberta Einer (born March 1992) is an Estonian creative director and fashion designer. She has worked for luxury fashion houses Balmain and Alexander McQueen, prior to starting her eponymous brand. She is known for her contemporary knitwear virtuosity, and the use of crystals in her dresses, including one design with over 30,000 crystals applied by hand. She entered the North American market in 2021, at The Webster Miami.

== Early life and education ==
Einer grew up in Tallinn, Estonia and hand made her first collection at age 12. She spent her childhood learning how to sew, crochet and embroider with her grandma. Einer completed a foundation from Central Saint Martins, and a fashion degree from University of Westminster.

== Career ==
In 2012, Einer at age 16 started working, alongside Irina Fedotova and Olivier Rousteing, as an embroidery assistant at the Parisian heritage brand Balmain. In 2017, she won the inaugural Saks Emerging Designer Showcase, and was invited to present at London Fashion Week one year after founding her own brand, bypassing the usual requirement of three years of establishment set by the British Fashion Council. Her entire Spring 2019 collection was featured in Vogue magazine. Her brand has been worn by Kylie Jenner, Megan Fox, Rihanna, Jorja Smith, Dua Lipa, and Lady Gaga. In 2020, she was featured in the Forbes 30 Under 30 List.

== Personal life ==
Einer is a campaigner for gender equality in Estonia, and has collaborated with Christian Louboutin and Care Bears in the past on public-benefit projects.
