= University Laboratory High School (Urbana, Illinois) =

High school in Urbana, Illinois

Coordinates: 40.112907°N 88.225402°W

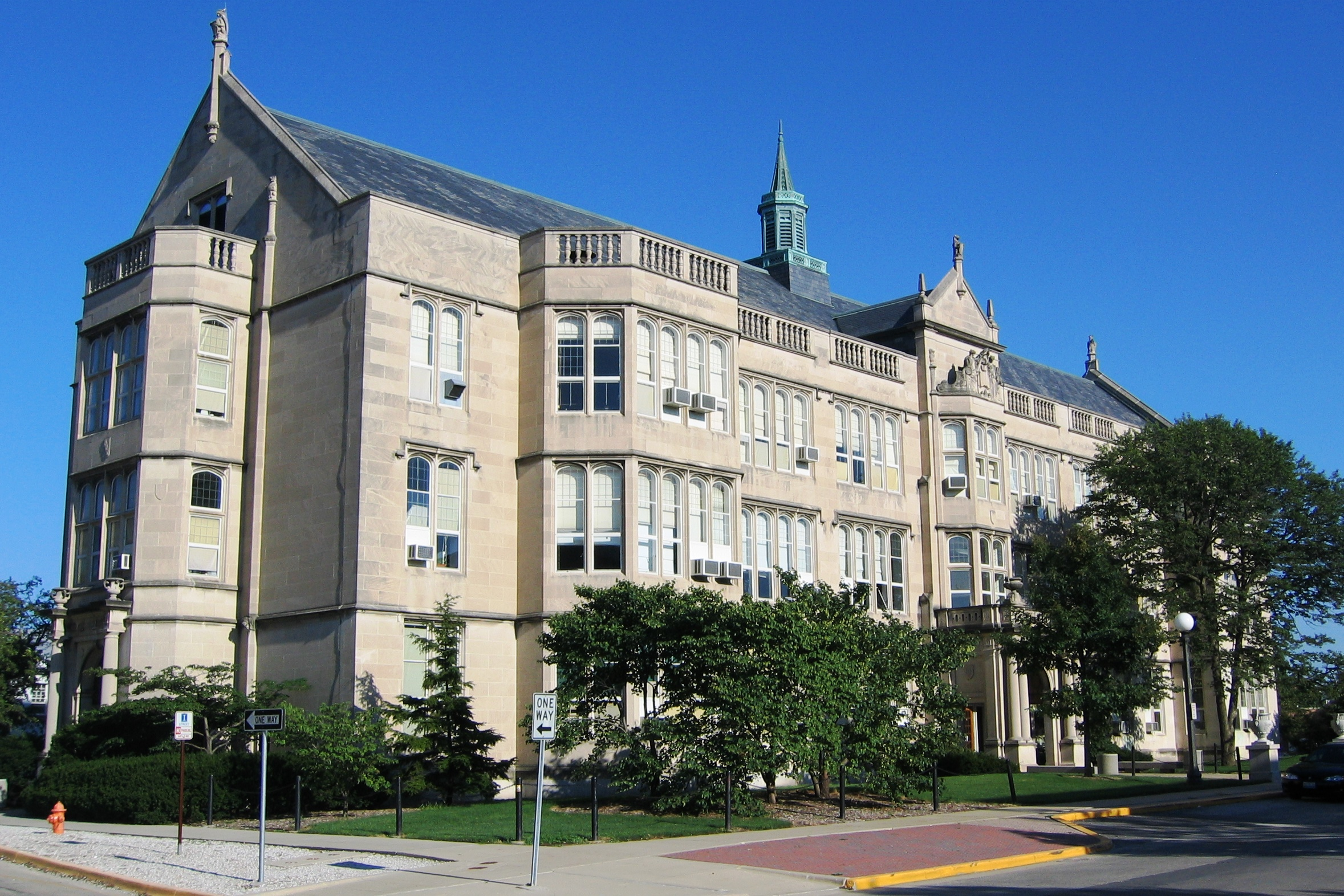

Location
- 1212 West Springfield Avenue; Urbana, Illinois 61801

Information
- School type: Public, High school, selective admission
- Founded: 1921
- School board: none
- Grades: 7/8–12
- Enrollment: 314 (2023-2024)
- Language: English
- Colors: Orange; Blue
- Athletics: IHSA
- Athletics conference: East Central Illinois Conference
- Team name: Illineks
- Website: Official website

The University Laboratory High School (also known as Uni High or just Uni) is a laboratory school located in the engineering section of the University of Illinois campus in Urbana, Illinois. It was established in 1921. It enrolls about 300 students, spanning five years (the traditional grades 9–12, preceded by an 8th grade year known as the "subfreshman" year).

== Funding and relationship to the University of Illinois ==
Uni's two primary sources of funding are private donations and the statewide per-pupil distribution financed in the Illinois state budget. It is also supported by mandatory school fees and a contribution from the University of Illinois Provost's office. Uni does not receive any property tax revenue due to enrollment being competitive vs. dependent upon residency in a particular district.

For many years, the school was funded by the University of Illinois at Urbana–Champaign as an institution to experiment with educational curriculum and to teach university students majoring in education. The University of Illinois withdrew most of its support in the early 1980s. The "laboratory" aspect persists in certain classes. An experimental math course was taught in the early 2000s and teachers continue to experiment in small, creative, ways.

The relationship to the university provides a number of benefits to the students. Students get full access to the university's library system†. Junior and senior students can enroll in courses at the university. Credit earned in this manner may then be applied to future study at the university level. Additionally, Kenney Gym, the university's former men's gymnasium, is used by Uni for physical education and by the volleyball and basketball teams.

† The high school library is a branch of the university library system and for this reason has been called "the largest high school library in the world."

In 2022, the school changed its colors to match those of its parent institution.

== Admissions and academics ==
Students apply to enter Uni as part of the incoming "subfreshmen" class which completes a year at eighth grade level before continuing on to the ninth grade. Roughly 65 students are admitted each year, keeping the school's total enrollment near 320 students. Admission decisions are based on previous academic history, extracurriculars, teacher recommendations, a personal statement, and a timed writing sample. The school no longer requires scores on the Secondary School Admission Test as part of its admission process. Students may apply during their sixth or seventh grade years. Whether immediately after graduation, the vast majority of students go on to enter a four-year college or university, although some choose to defer a year to study abroad, volunteer, or work.

Uni High has an excellent academic reputation. Many students are among the most accomplished in the nation every year. For example, the school had three national merit scholarship winners in both the 2021 and 2022 academic graduating classes. Given that only 2,500 winners are selected nationwide every year out of about 4 million high school graduates, Uni High graduates were approximately 74 times more likely than an average high school student to become national merit scholarship winners.

== Extracurriculars ==
Uni has had numerous successes in interscholastic competitions, including competitive chess (administered by the Illinois High School Association) and academic competitions. Students also participate in many clubs through the school, both for fun and to give back to their community.

=== Chess ===
The school's chess team has won the IHSA's team chess tournament seven times (1978, 1979, 1986, 1991, 1992, 1994, and 2009), and has been runner-up three times (1976, 1980, 1989). They came in second in the US National Championship in 1978 on a tiebreak. Members of that team included Thomas Krause, Robert Sah, Mark Zvilius, Jonathan Atkin, and Steven Schran. The team was coached by David Sprenkle, a Uni alum and ranked chess master. Currently, the school has rebuilt its competitive chess program.

=== Toshiba ExploraVision ===
Since the competition's inception, students at the school frequently participate in Toshiba ExploraVision, a science competition where students submit projects imagining theoretical inventions for the future. Under Biology teacher David Stone, ten teams placed first in the regional competition and of those, five went on to place first nationally (1996, 1997, 2009, 2010, and 2016) and one placed second (1998). Stone's last team, May Yang and Maher Adoni (both class of 2021), placed first at regionals in 2019. Under Biology teacher Cynthia Smyser (class of 1992), one team has placed second nationally (2020). Lawrence Zhao and Dina Hashash of the class of 2022 also placed first nationally in the competition before coming to Uni in 2017.

=== Academic teams ===
Uni High has several academic teams that compete each year and typically place highly in their respective competitions. These include Science Olympiad, Scholastic Bowl, WYSE Academic Challenge, Japan Bowl, and various math competitions.

The Uni High Scholastic Bowl team has qualified for the IHSA State Competition in four consecutive years, placing 4th in 2014 and 1st in 2015 in Class A before being bumped to Class AA and finishing 2nd in 2017. Throughout the season, which roughly runs from September to March, the team participates in a variety of tournaments and competitions. The program was started as a club in 2013 by Bruce Li and members of the Class of 2015, who then secured sponsorship from the school's administration to begin competing as a team in the 2013-2014 season. Uni has since grown into one of the strongest teams in the state, winning the NAQT State Championship in 2018 and the IHSA Class AA State Championship in 2019. In 2019, Uni placed second at the National Academic Quiz Tournaments High School Championship and third at the Partnership for Academic Competition Excellence National Scholastic Championship. In 2023, Uni won the IHSA Class A State Championship.

Tim Cho (class of 2019), member and leader of the Scholastic Bowl team, competed on Teen Jeopardy in 2018 and returned for the Reunion Tournament in 2023.

Since 1997, Uni has been an annual participant in the Academic Challenge, which consists of a series of tests in various academic fields, including biology, chemistry, computer science, engineering design, English, mathematics, and physics. The competition is open to high schools in Illinois and Missouri. For nine consecutive years from 1998 to 2006, as well as in 2008, 2009 and 2011, Uni was the state champion in the smallest division (enrollment under 300). In 2007, Uni competed in the next larger division and placed 2nd, despite the school's smaller enrollment in the 9th through 12th grades.

=== Service clubs ===
Uni High's Habitat for Humanity club works with the Habitat affiliate in Clarksdale, Mississippi. They hold several fundraisers throughout the year in order to send money to Clarksdale, as well as having an annual trip to Clarksdale every February during Agora Days where students work on houses. The club was founded by history teacher Bill Sutton and run by him until his retirement in 2017. The club is now run by history teacher Ben Leff (class of 2001). Several Uni alums have moved to the Clarksdale area to work with Habitat for Humanity or to work in various schools and after-school programs. Uni High's connection to Clarksdale allowed Anja Theissen and Uni High alumni Bianca Zarahescu, class of 2007, to found Spring Initiative, a program which mentors students and prepares them for greater academic success, personal growth, and an opportunity to overcome poverty. Habitat and Spring host events throughout the school year for students including the Sprabitat Dodgeball Tournament and Sprabitat Haunted House.

Uni has a Food Pantry club that volunteers at and raises money for the Wesley Food Pantry. The school also has a club called United for Uganda, which raises money for a grassroots organization in Uganda called Come Let's Dance. During the 2013-2014 school year, the club started a program through Come Let's Dance to sponsor a child in Uganda's education each year.

=== Madrigals ===
The Madrigals are a group of student singers who perform throughout the year, most notably at the Winter Party at the end of the fall semester. Before the Winter Party, the madrigals typically lead students through the halls, out of their last final exam, with candles and singing. The group was founded in 1948 and originally consisted of twelve members but now has grown to seventeen. In the 1970s, the group adopted Elizabethan style attire which they still wear at their appearances. In 2017, music director Richard Murphy organized a reunion of past Madrigals including some singers from the 1950s.

== School traditions ==
=== Agora Days (since 1977) ===
Agora Days, a four-day school week in late February when students, parents, faculty, alumni and friends of the school can teach hour-long classes about a wide range of topics, which have included popular cake decorating and massage classes. Students are required to take a number of academic-oriented classes, but classes based on playing sports, watching films or TV series, and studying video games also exist. Students have the same eight-hour schedule on each of the four days.

During Agora Days, for the past two decades, Sprabitat Club has sent about a dozen upperclassmen (primarily seniors) to Clarksdale, Mississippi to build houses, meet locals, and learn about local history. After a year off due to COVID-19, the 2022 trip split students among two sites to mitigate the virus: one in Tutwiler, Mississippi and the other in Clarksdale. Students also wore masks when indoors. The two groups ate dinner together at Meraki Roasting Company.

=== Handprints (since 1979) ===
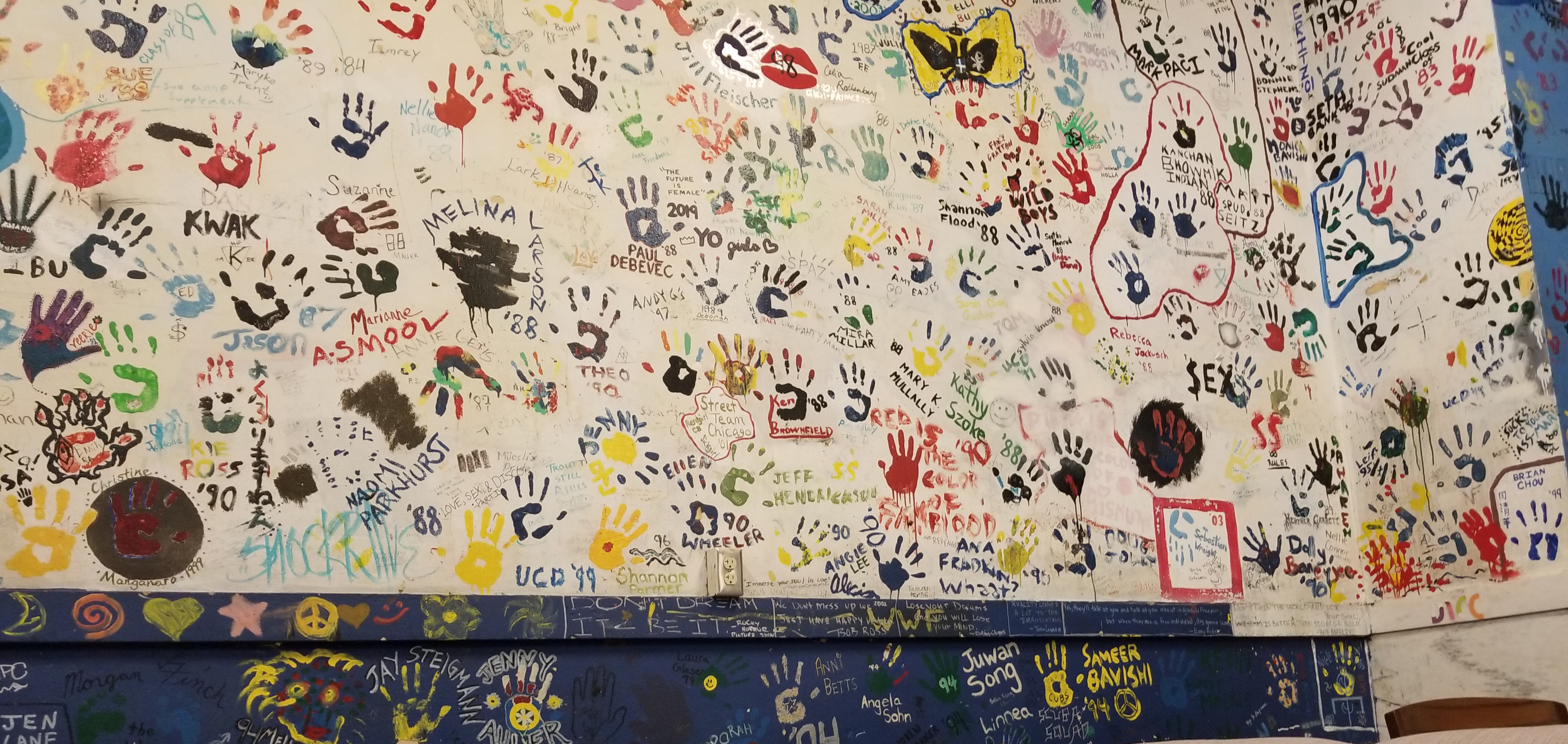
Colorfully painted alumni handprints on the junior/senior lounge wall (2021)

After graduation, each senior has the opportunity to leave a painted handprint on the walls of the school, a tradition that began in the lounge and has since expanded along the first-floor hallway.

=== Big Show (since 197?) ===
Big Show is a student directed and acted sketch comedy show that is put on by the school every year in the South Attic during the weeks after the spring musical. Since its inception as a variety talent show for the school, it has evolved into the comedy program that students know now. In the 1980s, Big Show began to take on themes rather than remain just a talent show, in the 1990s, students experimented with improvisational comedy, and in the 2000s, students began creating video sketches.

=== The Wylde Q. Chicken Award (since 1998) ===
The Wylde Q. Chicken Award, sponsored by the graduating class of 1972, is meant to recognize "spontaneous creativity," "unbidden originality," and "extraordinary acts in ordinary circumstances." It is awarded annually at the end of the school year; recipients are chosen by a panel of judges from the class of 1972 along with past winners of the award. Previous winners have included a series of promotional posters for the 50 states in the first floor restrooms, the staging of the American Revolution in comic strip form, and a Gilbert and Sullivan-style adaptation of Shakespeare's Macbeth.

=== X-Week (2013–20??) / X-Dinner (since 20??–present) ===
X-Week is an annual fundraising tradition at the school. Members of Student Council choose one or two charities, which are usually local, to donate the money to. Each day, a different class hosts a fundraiser. The senior class hosts the annual Senior Auction during the Friday of X-Week every year. They auction off a wide variety of items, which usually include class notes and baked goods, as well as more eccentric options such as a movie night at a teacher's house or the opportunity to go on a safari with a few members of the senior class. Big Show is the culminating event of X-Week. In recent years, the multiple events of X-Week have been discarded in favor of a joint X-Dinner leading up to Big Show.

=== Senior Project (since 2014) ===
The Senior Project was developed in 2014 by Assistant Director of Student Life Karl Radnitzer, who got the idea from a similar program at New Trier High School in Winnetka, Illinois. The project allows second-semester seniors to explore interests in a more career-oriented way than they would in a typical classroom. The project connects students with mentors in the Champaign-Urbana community who can help them explore their academic interests outside of the school building. Students come up with ideas for projects and submit them for approval to a Senior Project committee. If a project is approved, students then spend their second semester doing work for their project around three times a week. Students have worked in various labs at the University of Illinois, at the Crisis Nursery, at Carle Hospital, and at Krannert Center for the Performing Arts.

=== Quad Day (since 201?) ===
Mirroring the University of Illinois event by the same name, Uni holds an annual club fair near the start of the Fall semester dubbed "Quad Day" for both incoming subfreshmen and returning students to explore the school's offerings. This event is held in the green space between the high school and Uni Gym.

=== Subfreshman Oral History Project (since ??) ===
Every year, the subfreshman social studies class spends part of the second semester working on an oral history project. Social Studies teacher Melissa Schoeplein (class of 1994) and her class works with WILL radio station to conduct interviews on a certain topic, which varies by year. Past topics have included inside views of the military, people with disabilities, counterculture, the right to marry, and affirmative action in education. Subfreshmen are split into groups to conduct interviews. Each group member is assigned a role (either interviewer, team captain, technician, or scribe) in the interview, and the groups spend several weeks researching relevant information on their subject's life before conducting the interview. A group of older students, called WILL Interns, work with the interview material produced by the subfreshmen and turn it into an hour-long documentary published on the WILL Illinois Youth Media page.

=== Subbie Retreat and Subbie Buddies (since ??) ===
High schoolers known as "subbie buddies" are assigned subfreshmen at the beginning of the schoolyear as advisors on adapting to the school. At the end of their first week, subfreshmen participate in a day of class bonding through games and activities known as the "subbie retreat." The retreat usually ends with a capture the flag game which pits the subfreshmen against the subbie buddies. Throughout the year, subbie buddies host events for the subfreshmen which, in the past, have included a tri-holiday party, dodgeball games, and a corn maze.

=== Sprabitat Dodgeball Tournament (since ??) ===
Formerly the Habitat Dodgeball Tournament, the Sprabitat (Spring and Habitat for Humanity) Dodgeball Tournament occurs every year during the fall semester in Kenney Gym. Students compete in games in a bracket format to win the tournament but teams also have the opportunity to dress up and compete for the title of best costume.

=== Sprabitat Haunted House (since ??) ===
In October, Sprabitat holds a haunted house in Kenney Gym where students decorate a locker room and dress up as an array of scary characters. Students waiting to go through the haunted house can participate in a variety of events in the gymnasium and buy tickets to enter a raffle. The winners of this raffle have to opportunity to pie volunteers.

== Athletics ==
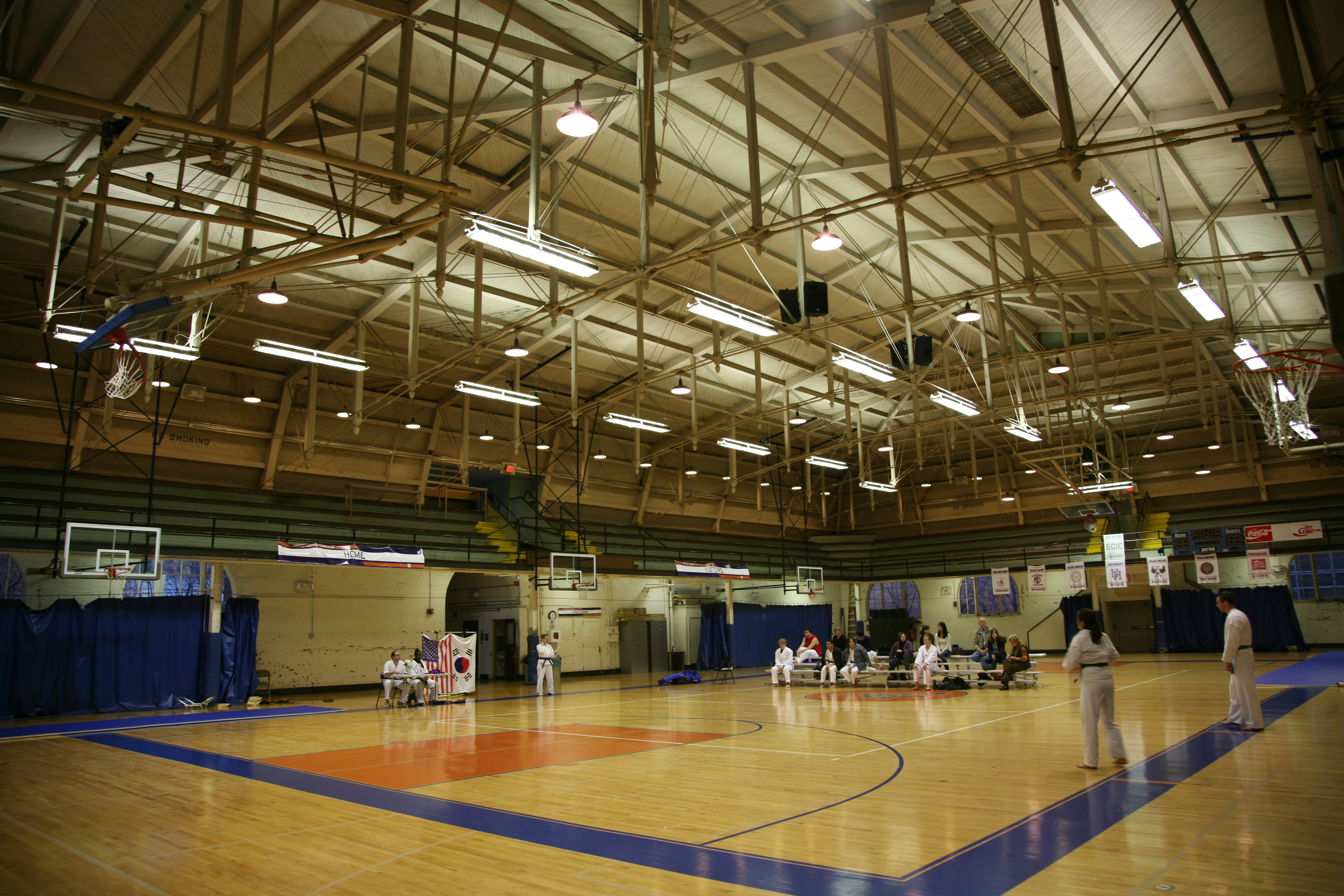
The interior of Kenney Gym Annex, which Uni High uses as their main gymnasium

Uni offers five no-cut sports for boys (Cross Country, Soccer, Basketball, Track & Field and Tennis) and six no-cut sports for girls (Cross Country, Swimming, Volleyball, Basketball, Soccer, and Track & Field), which usually compete in the IHSA 1A division. Members of the subfreshman class may participate in Cross Country, Track & Field, and Basketball.

While the high school teams use Kenney Gym, the subfreshmen basketball teams use the smaller secondary gym facility, called Uni Gym for their practice and games.

Students in P.E. class also run in the annual Illinois 5k.

For the 2025-26 school year, Uni updated its Athletic Code Forms to reflect a change to the no-cut policy. Though athletes still may not be dismissed from teams due to a lack of athletic prowess or skill, they are now liable to be cut if they miss more than 10 total practices in a season or more than one practice per week, including due to injury and excused absences.

=== Boys Basketball ===
Uni High is the record holder for the most consecutive boys basketball game losses in the state of Illinois with a streak of 96 games. The losing streak started in February 1974 and finally ended in November 1979 when they beat Tri-Valley High school with a score of 46-40. The losing streak extended through seven seasons including five winless seasons from the 1974/75 season through the 1978/79 season.

In 2024, Uni held a series of "Kenney Krush" games, a campaign put on by the Athletics Department to increase student involvement and attendance at games. Despite free shirts being offered, only one student signed up for the first game which ended in a loss of 28-74.

=== Swimming ===
Every year from 2014 until 2019, a Uni High swimmer was named Swimmer of the Year by The News-Gazette. This streak was maintained by Ema Rajić (class of 2018), Reed Broaders (class of 2021), and Sally Ma (class of 2022) who hold most of the swimming records at the school. The diving related records are held by Samaia Jones (class of 2020). The records that Rajić set in 100 breast and 200 IM are also Illinois State Records. During her time on the team, Rajić was also a repeat two-event state champion or four time state champion. Rajić and Shiela Findley (class of 1986), who was a two time state champion in 100 backstroke, are the only team members who have won a state competition for Uni.

The team used to practice in Kenney Gym but the pool closed in 2017 due to asbestos. The team practices and competes at the Urbana Aquatic Center.

Swimming as a team sport is only available for girls at Uni but some male alumni have also joined college teams such as Jake Regenwetter and Andrew Lin (both class of 2022). A number of boys have competed for Uni unofficially in the 2022 and the 2023 IHSA sectionals. Lin and Regenwetter also competed individually at the state tournament.

=== Tennis ===
The school's tennis team did not achieve a winning team record until 2014, but recently has enjoyed a period of regional dominance behind a variety of star players. Uni achieved an 8-1 record in 2017, powered by the duo of Van Gundersen and Samuel Li. Gundersen and Li won second place at the IHSA Sectional tournament, and finished tied for 25th. In 2018, Gundersen and Li were joined by freshman singles player Zachary Donnini (class of 2021). The team achieved a 10-3 record and won their first sectional championship. Donnini was joined by Krishna Subbiah on the News-Gazette all-area first team. In 2019, Donnini and Arjun Tangella achieved a second consecutive sectional championship for the team, defeating Centennial High School 4-6, 6-1, 6-2. Li and Subbiah qualified for state as a doubles pair and Akash Pardeshi qualified as a singles player, making it the second year in a row Uni had sent five players to state. Subbiah retired as the winningest player in Uni High History, collecting 74 varsity wins in his four years on the team.

After the 2020 season was cancelled because of the COVID-19 outbreak, only Donnini and Arav Jagroop (now senior double partners) returned in 2021. The team achieved a 12-3 record, the most regular season wins in school history. Donnini and Jagroop finished third in the IHSA sectional tournament after a semi-final loss to Central High School in the semifinals. Uni finished second as a team in their IHSA Sectional, breaking their streak of team sectional championships. As the 16 Seed entering the IHSA State Tournament, Donnini and Jagroop enjoyed a surprise run to the state semifinals. The duo defeated (#5) Mount Zion 6-4, 6-4 to qualify for the quarter-finals and subsequently beat (#12) Vernon Grove 6-2, 6-0 to make the semi-finals. Although Donnini and Jagroop lost 6-0, 7-6(4) loss to (#2) Metamora, they led Uni High to a Top 10 finish at the State Tournament for the first time in school history and were the first tennis players from the Champaign-Urbana metro area to make the state semi-finals in over 65 years.

=== Badminton ===
Though the school does not have an official badminton team, Andrea Li (class of 2024) won the IHSA state title in 2022 after a second-place finish in 2021. Li was Uni High's first state champion and the first from Central Illinois Li successfully defended her state champion title in 2023 and 2024.

=== Football ===
Uni currently has no football team. In the 1950s the administration fielded a 6-man team that included Donald Neville (class of 1950), Steve McNamara (class of 1951), and Peter Stearns (class of 1953).

Despite no football experience, Camden Coleman (class of 2018) walked-on to the Vanderbilt football team his freshman year. He played safety for the team and became team captain the following year which he retained through his 5th year in the 2022-2023 season.

=== IHSA Academic All-State Winners ===
Five Uni alumni have won the IHSA Academic All-State award: Ariel Zodhiates (class of 2000), George Gunter (class of 2014), Annemarie Michael (class of 2017), Arielle Summit (class of 2018), and Kate Ahmari (class of 2023). Every year each school can nominate one female and one male athlete who have at least a 3.50 GPA over their first seven semesters and have participated in two IHSA sports in both their senior and junior years. 12 spots are awarded annually.

== Building ==
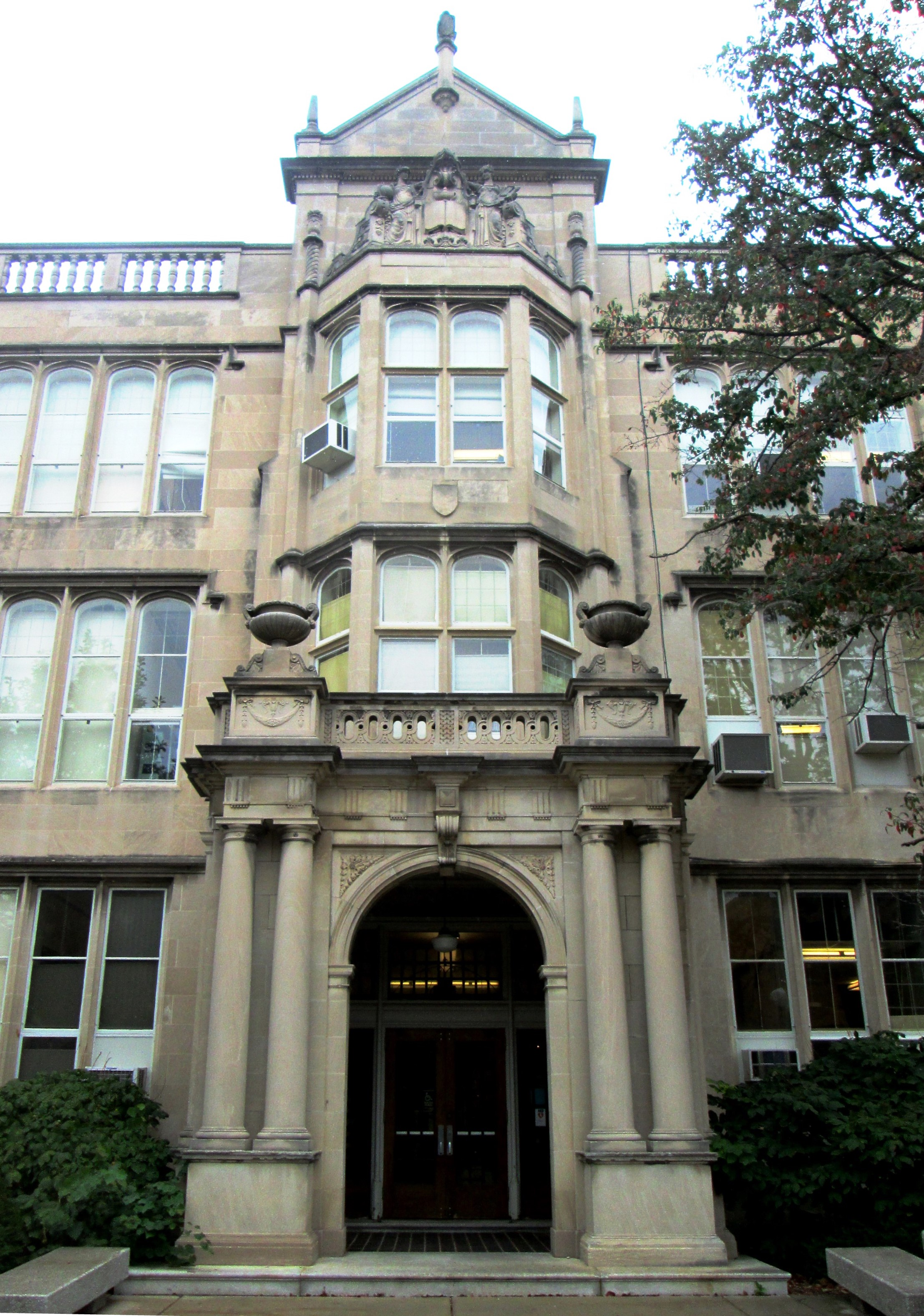
Main entrance to Uni (2013)

The building that houses University Laboratory High School was built from 1917 through 1918 and was designed by Holabird & Roche in the Late Gothic Revival style, with James M. White as the supervising architect. An earlier design for an H-shaped structure with two wings had been rejected in 1914, and it was not until May 1916 that the go-ahead was given to begin construction on the new design, which was estimated to cost $143,500.

When the building was completed, it was almost immediately converted into a general hospital for the Students’ Army Training Corps and School of Military Aeronautics for the duration of World War I. It was released to the high school before the 1921-22 school year.

=== Kenney Gym ===
Two blocks west of Uni sits the Kenney Gym and Annex, which is used by the school for athletics. Kenney predates Uni by two decades and was used by the University of Illinois for a variety of needs including their men's basketball team, women's volleyball team, and men's wrestling team. Uni shares the gym with the men's gymnastics team. As well as athletic team practices, the school holds P.E. class at Kenney Gym, making use of the gymnasium, track, and weight room.

Because of piping below the 100-year-old hardwood, the floors have warped, creating dead spots where balls do not bounce correctly and a safety hazard for students. In 2022, Uni sanded the floors to remove these spots and started a fundraiser to get the floors completely renovated. In May 2025, the school began a project to replace the gym floors, which had not been resurfaced in over 12 years. The new floors were completed in July in time for the 2025-26 school year and are expected to last for over 50 years.

=== Eastward demolition and construction plans ===
For some time, two houses sat on the east side of the school. One building housed the humanities departments (foreign language, fine arts, and English) and advancement offices while the other housed the math department. These buildings were torn down due to their deteriorating state sometime before 2017 which caused these departments to move to the main building and Kenney Gym. In 2022, Director Majerus submitted a proposal to University of Illinois to expand the school into the green space which has occupied the lot adjacent to the school since the houses were torn down. This proposal, if approved, would demolish Uni Gym which sits on the other side of the green space. Many students and faculty have expressed support for the demolition of Uni Gym. Suggested replacements include a cafeteria, a pool, and more classrooms.

In 2025, the environmental science teacher, Christian Millán-Hernandez, and the student Ecological Restoration Coalition Gardening Workshop announced intentions to update the existing green space. The total desired changes would cost between $50,000 and $80,000, so the team is applying to grants through the Illinois Green Fund. Due to the cost, Millán-Hernandez is seeking to first expand the existing butterfly garden at the southwest corner of the field next to the parking lot.

== Century celebration ==
The school celebrated its hundredth anniversary in 2021. Beginning in October 2021 and lasting until October 2022, the school promoted different themes throughout a "year of celebration" including Athletics and the Arts. During the year, the school named 99 alumni to their Class of Century, spanning from the class of 1924 to the class of 2018. As of January 16, 2023, the school has raised $4,959,401 through donations to the Century Celebration fund. The year of celebrating was capped off with a Century Celebration Weekend from October 14 through 16. During this weekend, the school hosted a dance for alumni, a gala, and a "state of the UNIon" address delivered by Dr. Elizabeth Majerus, the director of the school. George Will, class of 1959, gave the keynote speech at the gala. The school also used the celebration to change its school colors from royal blue and orange to the navy blue and orange to match the colors of the University of Illinois.

== Controversies ==
=== Financial deficit ===
In 2014, an accounting review revealed that Uni had accumulated a debt of $1.05 million because teacher salaries had been charged to an account that was no longer active. As an effort to correct this error, (now former) director Jeff Walkington assembled a Strategic Vision Task Force to improve Uni's budget model. The task force concluded that Uni's budget was unsustainable. Proposed solutions included charging tuition, making Uni into a charter school, and requesting more funding from the office of the provost at UIUC. As of spring 2019, this debt had not been rectified.

=== 2006 girls track assistant coach arrest ===
In 2007, Uni High girls' track assistant coach Yuri Ermakov was convicted of criminal sexual assault of a 15-year-old girl in 2005-2006, and distributing alcohol to minors in 2006. He was given a 12-year prison sentence, which he served in 2010-2020 in the Illinois Department of Corrections facility.

=== 2020 girls cross country head coach arrest ===
In 2020, after a 20 years of coaching the girls' and boys' cross country and track teams, head coach Doug Mynatt was convicted of three counts of distribution and possession of child pornography, which he had viewed both from his home in Savoy, Illinois, and from University of Illinois IP addresses. He pleaded guilty to all charges, and also admitted to having sexual relationships with two former students after they had graduated. Mynatt was sentenced to 10 years in federal prison, a sentence on the low end of the sentencing guidelines and motivated in part by the 45-page letter of support he received from sympathetic Uni teachers, faculty, and parents, along with several UIUC professors.

== Notable alumni and faculty ==
Three alumni are Nobel Prize laureates:

- Philip W. Anderson (class of 1940), for Physics in 1977
- Hamilton O. Smith (class of 1948), for Medicine in 1978
- James Tobin (class of 1935), for Economics in 1981

Other major award winners include:

- George Will (class of 1959), Pulitzer Prize for Commentary (1977)
- Eugie Foster (class of 1988), Nebula Award–winning (2009) author

Other notable alumni include (sorted by class year):

- Charlotte H. Bruner (class of 1934), scholar who was inducted into the Iowa Women's Hall of Fame in 1997
- Ross Bell (class of 1946), entomologist who studied carabid beetles
- Tina Howe (class of 1955), American playwright best known for Painting Churches and Coastal Disturbances; the latter received a Tony Award nomination for best play in 1987
- Roberta A. Ballard (class of 1957), pediatrician who contributed to neonatal medicine and is an author of the book Avery's Diseases of Newborns
- Mary Murphy Schroeder (class of 1958), Chief Judge of the United States Court of Appeals for the Ninth Circuit
- Clara D. Bloomfield (class of 1959), physician, cancer researcher, and the first woman to reach full professor at the University of Minnesota
- George Thomas Frampton Jr. (class of 1961), lawyer and environmentalist
- Fred Ausubel (class of 1962), molecular biologist
- Francine Patterson (class of 1965), an animal psychologist noted as the teacher of Koko, the gorilla who could sign 1000 words and understand 2000 signs.
- J. Peter Burkholder (class of 1971), musicologist and author
- Frederick Marx (class of 1973), film-maker, producer of the award-winning documentary Hoop Dreams
- Dorothea Blostein (class of 1976), computer scientist at Queen's University at Kingston
- Andrew Appel (class of 1976), computer scientist at Princeton University and son of Kenneth Appel who proved the Four color theorem
- Theodore Gray (class of 1982), a co-founder of Wolfram Research and winner of the Ig Nobel Prize for chemistry in 2002
- Iris Chang (class of 1985) was a journalist and author (The Rape of Nanking), and was the subject of the book Finding Iris Chang.
- Nina Paley (class of 1986), cartoonist, animator, free culture activist
- Rahul Pandharipande (class of 1986), mathematician and professor at Swiss Federal Institute of Technology in Zurich (ETH), Clay Research Award recipient
- Daniel Shapiro (class of 1986), U.S. ambassador to Israel
- Shamit Kachru (class of 1987), string theory specialist at Stanford University
- Paul Debevec (class of 1988), Academy Award–winning (2010, 2019) and Emmy Award–winning (2022) researcher in computer graphics
- Ben Scott (class of 1995), policy advisor and former advisor to Hillary Clinton
- Erika Harold (class of 1997 but transferred to Urbana High School), Harvard educated attorney, politician, and former Miss America
- Helen Estabrook (class of 1999), film producer who produced Whiplash (2014 film)
- Jeremy Hobson (class of 1999), co-host of NPR's Here and Now
- Tony Khan (class of 2001), Founder, co-owner, president, and CEO of All Elite Wrestling, co-owner and Vice Chairman/Director of Football Operations of Fulham F.C., co-owner and Senior Vice President of Football Technology & Analytics of Jacksonville Jaguars
- Sasha Velour (class of 2004), Rupaul's Drag Race season 9 winner
- Jonathan Kuck (class of 2007), speedskater who won a silver medal in the team pursuit for the U.S. in the 2010 Winter Olympics
- Ema Rajić (class of 2018), swimmer who competed for the Croatian team in the 2020 Summer Olympics
