= Roberta González =

French painter

Roberta González (1908 in Paris – 1976) was a French painter. She was the daughter of the sculptor Julio González. After taking an initial interest in the works of the Surrealist painters who came to her father's studio, she found herself entirely in harmony with the work of Hans Hartung, whom she married. She painted heads, nudes, still-life elements and birds, reducing them to their simplest features.

== Education ==
González attended the Académie Colarossi.
