= Roberta A. Ballard =

American pediatrician

Roberta A. Ballard is recognized for her contributions to neonatal medicine. In 1965, she graduated from the University of Chicago's medical school and has dedicated much of her life to research on newborn prenatal health. Specifically, Dr. Ballard studies ways to treat and prevent chronic lung disease in premature infants. Some of her research includes the collection of data regarding how inhaled Nitric Oxide can help premature infants who are suffering from lung disease and are undergoing medical ventilation. From her studies she was able to find that Nitric Oxide reduced the risk of death and shortened hospitalization time for infants born prematurely who suffer from lung disease. These contributions have helped to prevent chronic lung disease and brain injury harming infants. Hospitals that Dr. Ballard is associated with include the Hospital of the University of Philadelphia, University of PA Medical Center/Presbyterian, Saint Christopher's Hospital for Children, and Children's Hospital of Philadelphia. Dr. Ballard also served as a Professor of Pediatrics at the University of California, San Francisco School of Medicine. Currently, she is Emeritus Professor of Pediatrics and Obstetrics and Gynecology at the University of Pennsylvania. While also being a professor, Dr. Ballard has contributed her knowledge in articles including the New England Journal of Medicine, Pediatrics, Journal of Perinatology, and more. She has served on a number of scientific and medical boards including the American Board of Pediatrics in 1972 and is an author of the book Avery's Diseases of Newborns. The book focuses on the care and treatment of neonates. Dr. Ballard's research and contributions have helped enhance technology and prevent infant death. Her improvements in technology have not only improved the lives of premature infants, but she also seeks to help women who are pregnant to assure they receive proper prenatal attention.

== Education ==
Roberta Ballard spent fifteen years educating herself in a variety of places after graduating from University Laboratory High School. From 1957-1961 she was at Earlham College in Richmond, IN, AB. Ballard went on from 1965-1967 receiving her MD at the University of Chicago, School of Medicine in Chicago, IL. Roberta did a Pediatrics Internship from 1965-1967 at the University of Chicago Hospital in Chicago, IL. She would also do a Pediatrics Residency there from 1966-1967. Ballard would then go to Stanford University, Palo, Alto, CA from 1967-1968 doing another Pediatrics Residency. She would then travel to Washington, DC to do a Neonatology Fellowship at George Washington University Hospital from 1968-1969. Roberta Ballard's would end her education in San Francisco, CA at the Cardiovascular Research Institute doing a Neonatology Fellowship from 1970-1972. She would then stay in San Francisco as a professor of pediatrics at the University of California.

== Board Certification ==
Roberta Ballard would get her board certifications in 1972 through American Board of Pediatrics. Also through Sub-Board of Neonatal-Perinatal Medicine in 1975 and again in 1992.
