= Roberta Sheridan =

American school teacher (c. 1864–1918)

Roberta B. Sheridan (c. 1864–1918) was the first African American public school teacher in a Baltimore City public school.

Sheridan was born in Baltimore County to Daniel and Arietta Sheridan. A graduate of the city's "colored high and grammar school, and colored normal school," Sheridan was appointed as teacher at the Waverly Colored Public School in 1888. Prior to her teaching appointment in Baltimore, Sheridan was employed as a teacher in Baltimore County, during the 1882–1883 and 1887–1888 school years. Her appointment at Waverly quelled seven years of protest over the lack of African-American teachers at the school.

While at Waverly, Sheridan married fellow teacher, George W. Biddle on July 26, 1892. A daughter, Hester Maud Biddle, was born in 1893. The couple separated after two years of marriage after claims of abuse by Sheridan towards Biddle. While Sheridan was denied a divorce twice, Biddle was granted a divorce in 1903 on the grounds of desertion. She began to use her maiden name again and resumed her work as a teacher in Baltimore. From the time of her divorce until her death in 1918 from "natural insufficiency" and "shock," Sheridan lived with her mother and daughter at 1441 North Carey Street in the neighborhood of Sandtown-Winchester.
