= Roberta Richman =

- Born: 1941
- Known for: painting, printmaking

Roberta Richman is an artist, former corrections administrator, and founding member of the arts organization Hera Gallery located in Wakefield, Rhode Island.

== Work ==
=== Corrections ===
Richman is known as an advocate for prisoner reentry and reform of conditions for female offenders. She worked in corrections for 33 years before retiring in 2012. She began coordinating arts programs for the incarcerated, and would eventually serve as warden of the Adult Correctional Institutions' Women's Facilities in Rhode Island for 10 years. She later served as Director of Rehabilitative Services. In retirement, she continues to advocate for the rights of the incarcerated and currently serves on the board of directors at the Nonviolence Institute in Providence, Rhode Island. She also serves as interim director and board member of Welcome House, an emergency shelter for people living in Washington County, Rhode Island.

=== Visual arts ===
Roberta Richman is a printmaker and painter. She studied printmaking at Indiana University, where she earned her MFA. She was one of the founding members of Hera Gallery a feminist art space in Wakefield, Rhode Island. She has served on the leadership of the organization since its inception in 1977.

== Awards ==
- 2020; Acts of Leadership Award, Leadership Rhode Island
- 2012; She Shines Women of Achievement, YWCA Rhode Island
- 2012; Criminal Justice Hall of Fame, Rhode Island.
- 1999; Goodrich Award for Distinguished Public Service, awarded by the Rhode Island Public Expenditure Council.
- 1998; Woman of the Year, awarded by the Rhode Island Commission on Women.
