= Roberta Woodgate =

Canadian nurse and academic

- Born: 1956 (age 69–70); Canada

Academic background
- Education: BSN, 1989, MN, 1993, PhD, 2001, University of Manitoba
- Thesis: The experience of acute pain in the hospitalized young child: a qualitative study (1993)

Academic work
- Institutions: University of Manitoba

Roberta Lynn Woodgate (born 1956) is a Canadian nurse. She is a Distinguished Professor and Tier 1 Canada Research Chair in Child and Family Engagement in Health Research and Healthcare at the University of Manitoba.

== Early life and education ==
Woodgate was born in Canada in 1956. She completed her Bachelor of Nursing degree in 1989 and her Master of Nursing degree in 1993 at the University of Manitoba (U of M). Woodgate then accepted a one-year Pat Scorer Fellowship from the Medical Advisory Committee and the Children's Hospital Foundation of Manitoba Inc before earning her PhD in 2001.

== Career ==
Upon completing her PhD, Woodgate accepted a faculty position at the University of Manitoba where she received the 2002 Boehringer Ingelheim Oncology Nurse of the Year Award. As a professor at U of M, Woodgate led studies on children's perceptions of their cancer symptoms through the use of video games. She also researched the concept of transition in childhood illness and death, and parents' and children's decisions and experiences in childhood clinical research. As a result of her paediatric work, Woodgate was recognized by Prime Minister Stephen Harper as one of Manitoba's "Nurse to Know" and was a nominee for Winnipeg's 2009 Women of Distinction.

Woodgate continued to study the use of videos games in the health care industry throughout her tenure which led to the development of EMÜD. The video game was developed to help pediatric cancer patients inform healthcare professionals on their mental health and what may be helping to improve their feelings. She also studied teenagers with anxiety and co-produced a series that used dancers from the Royal Winnipeg Ballet Aspirant Program to describe the experiences of young people living with an anxiety disorder. Her research earned her a 2017 Merit Award in Research, Scholarly Work and Creative Activities.

In 2018, Woodgate was appointed a Tier 1 Canada Research Chair in Child and Family Engagement in Health Research and Healthcare to promote and fund her research in children's health and alternative methods to enhance health policy and practice. Upon accepting this role, she began three research studies which focused on improving children's mental health. Her first research project focused on developing better supports and services for non-suicidal youth who engage in self-injury. Her second project involved designing a new model of respite care while her third project aimed to improve services and support for older teenagers who were ageing out of the child welfare system.

During the start of the COVID-19 pandemic, Woodgate received a Partnership Engage Grant from the Social Sciences and Humanities Research Council to fund her project "Finding Solutions for the Challenges Faced by Young Workers in the COVID-19 Era." In July 2020, Woodgate and two other faculty members were recognized as Distinguished Professors at the institution. Later, in 2021, Woodgate's research was recognized with a Canadian Association of Schools of Nursing Research Excellence award. As the pandemic progressed, Woodgate also started a 4-year study is to understand and document the lived experience of families of immunocompromised children. She also began a five-year project to evaluate the impact of the enhanced telemental health services model on children in the four First Nations communities of Island Lake Anishininew Nations.
