= Pediatric Hematology and Oncology =

- Discipline: Pediatry, hematology, oncology
- Language: English
- Edited by: Elliott Vichinsky

Publication details
- History: 1984-present
- Publisher: Informa Healthcare (United States)
- Frequency: 8/year
- Impact factor: .09 (2023)

Standard abbreviations
- ISO 4: Pediatr. Hematol. Oncol.

Indexing
- ISSN: 0888-0018 (print); 1521-0669 (web)

Links
- Journal homepage

Pediatric Hematology and Oncology is an international peer-reviewed medical journal that covers all aspects of pediatric hematology and oncology. The journal covers immunology, pathology, and pharmacology in relation to blood diseases and cancer in children and shows how basic experimental research can contribute to the understanding of clinical problems.

== Editor ==
The editor in chief of Pediatric Hematology and Oncology is Elliott Vichinsky, Director of Hematology/Oncology at Children's Hospital and Research Center at Oakland, the Northern California Sickle Cell Center, the California Thalassemia Center and the California Reference Hemoglobin Laboratory.
