= 20th-century French art =

Art in France during the 20th century

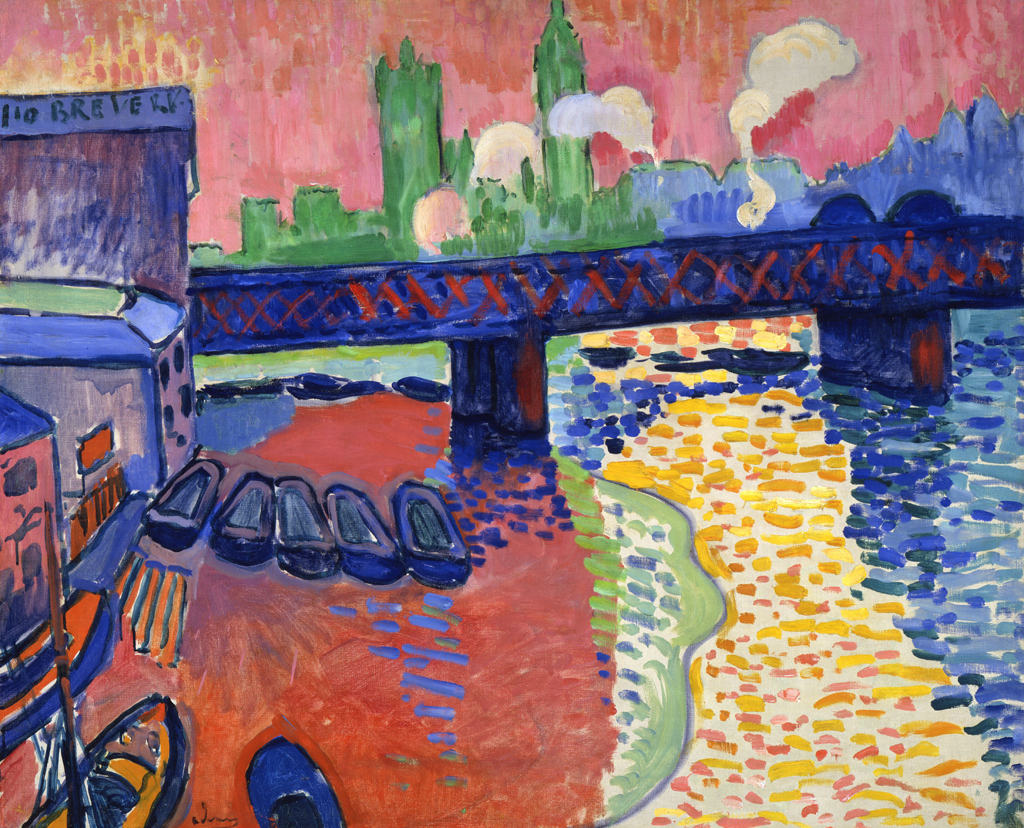
André Derain, 1906, Charing Cross Bridge, London, co-founder of Fauvism with Matisse

20th-century French art developed out of the Impressionism and Post-Impressionism that dominated French art at the end of the 19th century. The first half of the 20th century in France saw the even more revolutionary experiments of Cubism, Dada and Surrealism, artistic movements that would have a major impact on western, and eventually world, art. After World War II, while French artists explored such tendencies as Tachism, Fluxus and New realism, France's preeminence in the visual arts progressively became eclipsed by developments elsewhere (the United States in particular).

== From Impressionism to World War II ==
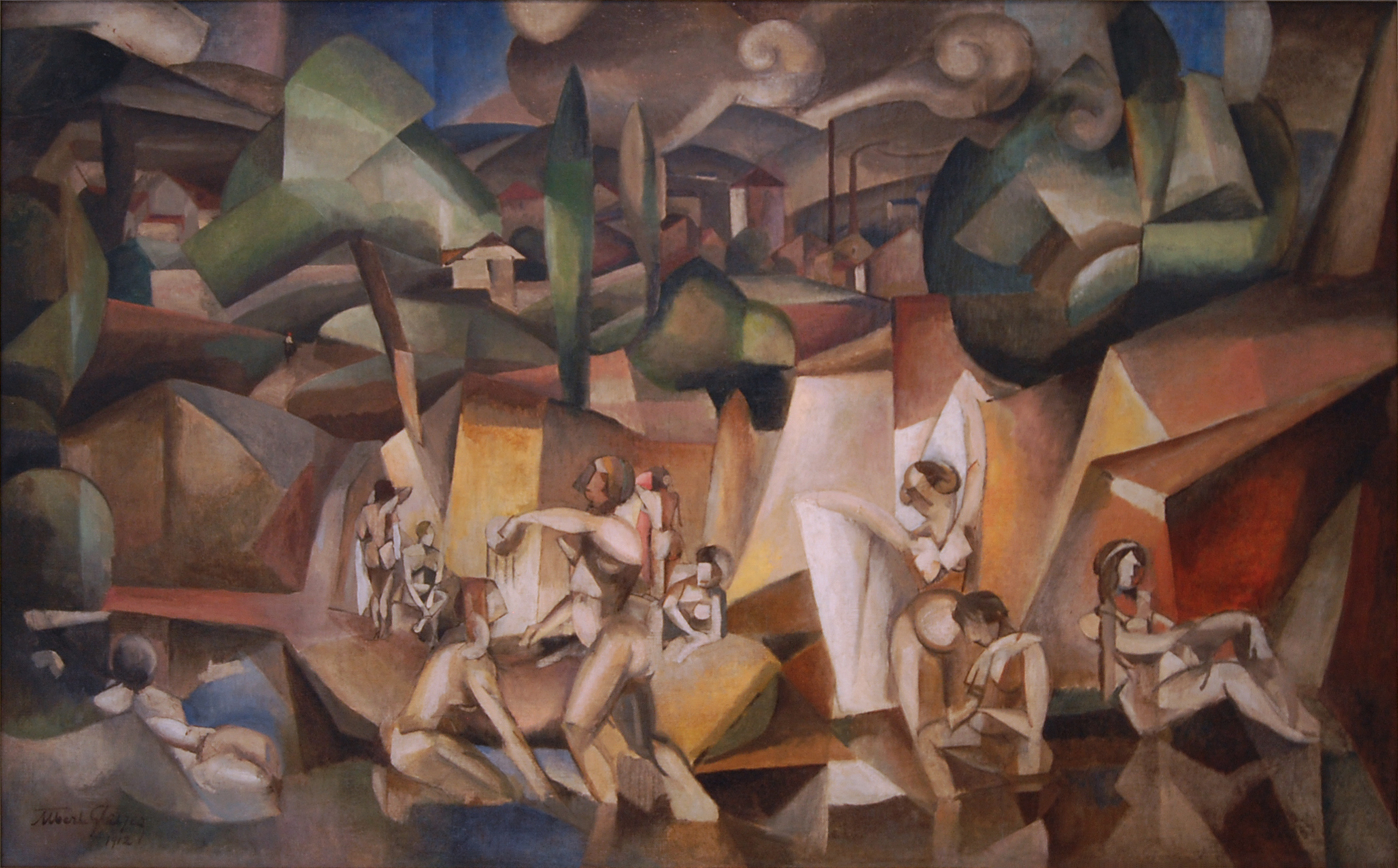
Albert Gleizes, 1912, Les Baigneuses (The Bathers), oil on canvas, 105 x 171 cm, Musée d'Art Moderne de la Ville de Paris

The early years of the twentieth century were dominated by Neo-Impressionism and Divisionism, experiments in colour and content that Impressionism, Post-Impressionism and Symbolism had unleashed. The products of the far east also brought new influences. Les Nabis explored a decorative art in flat plains with a Japanese print graphic approach. From 1904 Les Fauves exploded in color (much like German Expressionism).

The influence of African tribal masks led Pablo Picasso to his Demoiselles d'Avignon of 1907. Picasso and Georges Braque (working independently) returned to and refined Cézanne's way of rationally understanding objects in a flat medium; but their experiments in cubism would also lead them to integrate all aspects of day-to-day life: newspapers, musical instruments, cigarettes, wine. Picasso and Braque exhibited their analytical Cubism under an exclusivity contract at the gallery of Daniel-Henry Kahnweiler, located on a quiet street behind La Madeleine in the 8th arrondissement of Paris. At the same time, Jean Metzinger, Albert Gleizes, Henri Le Fauconnier, Robert Delaunay and Fernand Léger exhibited alternate forms of Cubism at the Salon des Indépendants and the Salon d'Automne; massive exhibitions that brought Cubism to the attention of the general public. These artists had no intention of analyzing and describing mundane objects from daily life—a bowl of fruit, a pipe, violin or guitar—but chose subjects of vast proportion, of provocative social and cultural significance, expressing the dynamic qualities of modern urban life. Cubism in all its phases and divers styles would dominate Europe and America for the next ten years.

Jean Metzinger, 1911, Le goûter (Tea Time), oil on canvas, 75.9 x 70.2 cm, Philadelphia Museum of Art. Exhibited at the 1911 Salon d'Automne. Published in Fantasio, 15 Oct. 1911, Du "Cubisme" by Jean Metzinger and Albert Gleizes, 1912, and Les Peintres Cubistes by Guillaume Apollinaire, 1913, Paris. André Salmon dubbed this painting "The Mona Lisa of Cubism"

World War I did not stop the dynamic creation of art in France. In 1916 a group of discontents met in a bar in Zurich (the Cabaret Voltaire) and create the most radical gesture possible: the anti-art of Dada. At the same time, Francis Picabia and Marcel Duchamp were exploring similar notions. At an art show in New York in 1917 Duchamp presented a white porcelain urinal signed R. Mutt as work of art, becoming the father of the "readymade".

The killing fields of the war (nearly one-tenth of the French adult male population had been killed or wounded) had made many see the absurdity of existence. This was also the period when the Lost Generation took hold: rich Americans enjoying the liberties of Prohibition-free France in the 1920s and poor G.I.'s going abroad for the first time. Paris was also, for African Americans, amazingly free of the racial restrictions found in America (James Baldwin, Richard Wright, Josephine Baker).

When Dada reached Paris, it was avidly embraced by a group of young artists and writers who were fascinated with the writings of Sigmund Freud, and particularly by the notion of the unconscious mind. The provocative spirit of Dada became linked to the exploration of the unconscious mind through the use of automatic writing, chance operations and, in some cases, altered states. The surrealists quickly turned to painting and sculpture. The shock of unexpected elements, the use of Frottage, collage and decalcomania, the rendering of mysterious landscapes and dreamscapes were to become the key techniques through the rest of the 1930s.

World War II ended the feast. Many surrealists like Yves Tanguy, Max Ernst, André Breton and André Masson fled occupied France for New York and the States (Duchamp had already been in the U.S. since 1936), but the cohesion and vibrancy were lost in the American city.

For a chronological list of artists from the period, go here.

== School of Paris ==
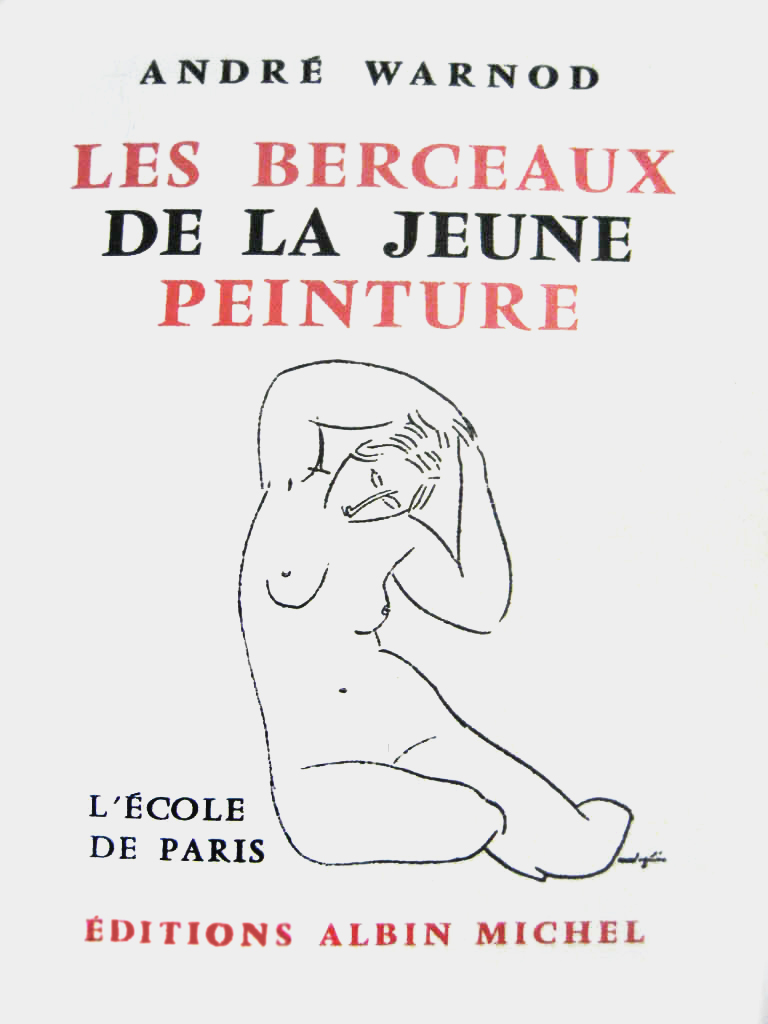
André Warnod, Les Berceau de la jeune peinture, sketch by Modigliani, L'École de Paris

The term "School of Paris" (French: École de Paris) denotes the French and émigré artists who were active in Paris during the first half of the 20th century. Rather than representing a singular art movement or institution, it underscores the significance of Paris as a hub for Western art during the early 1900s to 1940, attracting artists globally and emerging as a focal point for artistic endeavors. Coined by André Warnod, the School of Paris describes a loosely connected community, particularly non-French artists, congregating in the cafes, salons, shared workspaces, and galleries, especially of Montparnasse. Many artists of Jewish descent played a notable role in the School of Paris, later exerting a substantial influence on art in Israel.

Between World War I and World War II, artists in Paris engaged in experimental styles such as Cubism, Orphism, Surrealism, and Dada. Both French and foreign artists participated in this creative milieu, including figures like Jean Arp, Joan Miró, Constantin Brâncuși, Raoul Dufy, Tsuguharu Foujita, Belarusian artists Michel Kikoine and Pinchus Kremegne, Lithuanian artists Jacques Lipchitz and Arbit Blatas, who extensively documented key figures of the School of Paris, as well as Polish artists Marek Szwarc and Morice Lipsi, and Russian-born prince Alexis Arapoff. Many of the artists lived in La Ruche, meaning beehive in French, was a complex of studio apartments where several school of Paris artists lived when first arriving Paris.

=== Jewish School of Paris ===
Artists of Jewish descent played a significant role in the École de Paris, drawn to the art capital of the world, Paris, from Eastern Europe to escape persecution and pogroms. Montparnasse became a hub for many of these artists, including notable painters like Marc Chagall, Jules Pascin, Chaïm Soutine, Isaac Frenkel Frenel, Amedeo Modigliani, and Abraham Mintchine. These artists often depicted Jewish themes, infusing their work with intense emotions. Coined in 1925 by André Warnod, the term "l’École de Paris" aimed to counter xenophobia towards foreign artists, many of whom were Jewish Eastern Europeans. The Nazi occupation led to the tragic loss of several prominent Jewish artists during the Holocaust, contributing to the decline of the Jewish School Of Paris, with some artists relocating to Israel or the US.

== Post World War II ==
The French art scene immediately after the war went in several directions. Some continued the artistic experiments of the 1930s and 1940s, especially Surrealism and Geometric abstraction, and others associated with Lyrical abstraction, Tachisme, Nuagisme, Art Informel and paysagisme abstrait (modes of expression along similar lines as Abstract Expressionism or action painting from New York). These artists included Wols, Jean Fautrier, Hans Hartung, Jean-Paul Riopelle, Jean Degottex, Gérard Ernest Schneider, Pierre Soulages, Jean Messagier and Georges Mathieu.

At the same time, Jean Dubuffet dominated the early post-war years while exploring childlike drawings, graffiti and cartoons in a variety of media in what he called "Art Brut" (see Outsider art). Meanwhile, François Fiedler went searching for the perfect combination of color and texture amongst the multitudinous layers of paint that found its way onto his canvas.

In 1960, Pierre Restany and Yves Klein founded the New Realism movement (in French: Nouveau Réalisme), and a joint declaration was signed on October 27, 1960, by nine people: Yves Klein, Arman, Francois Dufrêne, Raymond Hains, Martial Raysse, Pierre Restany, Daniel Spoerri, Jean Tinguely and Jacques de la Villeglé; in 1961 these were joined by César, Mimmo Rotella, then Niki de Saint Phalle and Gérard Deschamps. The artist Christo joined the group in 1963. The members of the group saw the world as an image, from which they would take parts and incorporate them into their works. They sought to bring life and art closer together, and has often been compared with Pop Art. Yves Klein had nude women roll around in blue paint and throw themselves at canvases; Niki de Saint-Phalle created bloated and vibrant plastic figures; Arman gathered together found objects in boxed or resin-coated assemblages; César Baldaccini produced a series of large compressed object-sculptures (similar to Chamberlain's crushed automobiles); Daniel Spoerri used meals and food as artistic material.

Associated in various ways with New Realism, the artists of the international Fluxus movement – named and loosely organized in 1962 by George Maciunas (1931–78), a Lithuanian-born American artist – encouraged a do it yourself aesthetic, and valued simplicity over complexity. Like Dada before it, Fluxus included a strong current of anti-commercialism and an anti-art sensibility, disparaging the conventional market-driven art world in favor of an artist-centered creative practice. Fluxus artists preferred to work with whatever materials were at hand, and either created their own work or collaborated in the creation process with their colleagues. Outsourcing part of the creative process to commercial fabricators was not usually part of Fluxus practice. The most significant French Fluxus artist, Ben Vautier incorporated graffiti and found objects into his work.

Other artist in the period include Victor Vasarely who invented Op-Art by designing sophisticated optical patterns.

In May 1968, the radical youth movement, through their atelier populaire, produced a great deal of poster-art protesting the moribund policies of president Charles de Gaulle.

For a chronological list of artists from the period, go here.

== Contemporary art in France ==
Many contemporary artists continue to be haunted by the horrors of the war and the specter of the holocaust. Christian Boltanski's harrowing installations of the lost and the anonymous are particularly powerful.

The work of his wife Annette Messager, who represented France at the 2005 Venice Biennale, deals with issues of identity and feminism.

The photographer, installation artist and conceptual artist Sophie Calle's work is distinguished by its use of arbitrary sets of constraints, and evokes the French literary movement of the 1960s known as Oulipo. Her work frequently depicts human vulnerability, and examines identity and intimacy. She is recognized for her detective-like ability to follow strangers and investigate their private lives. Her photographic work often includes panels of text of her own writing.

Beginning in the 1980s, the Figuration Libre movement was constituted around French figures like Remi Blanchard, François Boisrond, Robert Combas, Hervé Di Rosa, Richard Di Rosa and Louis Jammes. Between 1982 and 1985, these artists exhibited on several occasions with their American counterparts: Keith Haring, Jean-Michel Basquiat, Kenny Scharf, Tseng Kwong Chi and inter alia, Crash (exhibitions in New York, London, Pittsburgh, and Paris). The Figuration Libre falls under the prolongation of artists and historical movements whose specificity was the opening to marginalized forms of expression, as the Cubism had opened with African art and Oceanic art (amongst other influences), and "art brut" with the children's drawings, Pop art with advertising and comic strips.

Pierre et Gilles (Pierre Commoy and Gilles Blanchard), are gay French artistic and romantic partners. They produce highly stylized photographs, building their own sets and costumes as well as retouching the photographs. Their work often features images from popular culture, gay culture including porn (especially James Bidgood), and religion.

Other important contemporary French artists include Jean-Pierre Raynaud, Orlan, Ernest Pignon-Ernest, Daniel Buren, Jean-Marc Bustamante, Pierre Huyghe, Valérie Mréjen.

== See also ==
- Tachisme
- Nouveau réalisme
- School of Paris
- France in the twentieth century
