= Philippe Hosiasson =

French painter (1898–1978)

- Born: February 27, 1898 [O. S. Feb. 15] Odessa, Ukraine
- Died: July 13, 1978
- Education: Odessa University, Odessa Art School of Drawing (now known as the Grekov Odessa Art School)
- Known for: Painting
- Style: Abstract expressionism
- Movement: Ecole de Paris

Philippe Hosiasson (1898–1978) was a Jewish Ukrainian artist, notable for early forays into abstract expressionism, which Time magazine once described as "wavy landscapes carve[d] out of creamy colors" that bridged early modern art in both Europe and New York, and led to a 1950s exhibition at the Museum of Modern Art (MoMA).

In France, Hosiasson was associated with painters Léon Zack, Michel Tapié, and Michel Seuphor. He was also a member of critic Waldemar George's neo-humanist branch of the Ecole de Paris, the group of French artists and emigres that dominated the international art world for the first half of the twentieth century.

In New York, Hosiasson was similarly associated with painters Kenneth Noland, Barnett Newman, Mark Rothko, and art critic Clément Greenberg, all of whom (barring Noland) came to be associated with the New York School, a group of New York City-based American artists and emigres who started out exhibiting at the pioneering modernist Kootz Gallery in New York" — and ended up dominating the international art world in the second half of the twentieth century,

== From Ukraine to Germany ==
Already drawing by age 14, Hosiasson first came in contact with Western avant-garde art on a trip to Berlin ca. 1910. By 1912, he was briefly enrolled at the Odessa Art School of Drawing. Then a hub for the emerging avant-garde, heavily influenced by Impressionism, Modernism, and Post-Impressionism, its students were referred to as "Odessa Parisians." The European focus birthed a strong Ukrainian tradition of European-influenced art, including for Ukrainian Jewish artists whose training was restricted in many parts of the Russian Empire.

At Odesa University, where Hosiasson subsequently studied law and art history, he also befriended Ukrainian painter Alexandre Fasini. In 1917, Hosiasson published a text on El Greco and, in 1920, his university sent him to Rome, where he met André Derain, who was working for Diaghilev's ballets. Fascinated by Roman palaces, Hosiasson sketched his surroundings, the crowd, the streets. In 1922, he left for Berlin, where he became a set designer for the Russian Ballets for Boris Romanov. In 1924, he moved to Paris.

== From Paris to New York ==
In Paris, Hosiasson and French painter Léon Zack joined the neo-humanist group, founded by French Jewish art critic Waldemar George and painters from the art school Académie Ranson.

"During late 1940s, Hosiasson started painting his first "informal" paintings, which French painter Michel Tapié and Belgian painter Michel Seuphor associated with Abstract Expressionism. Supported by art critic Clément Greenberg, Hosiasson exhibited work with Barnett Newman, Mark Rothko, and Kenneth Noland at the Kootz Gallery in New York."

He decorated the Pavillon de la Martinique during the 1937 Paris World Fair. In 1956–1957, his works were displayed in the Museum of Modern Art.

== Collections ==
- Buffalo AKG Art Museum,
- North Carolina Museum of Art,
- Taubman Museum of Art at the University of Virginia
- Musée d'Art et d'Histoire du Judaïsme,
- Museum of Modern Art (MoMA)

== Personal ==
Born to a family from Riga, Hosiasson was raised in Odesa. His father Herman was a wealthy merchant, able to pay for the family to escape local bouts of antisemitism and pogroms through travel. His mother Elizabeth Jakubson was a high school Latin-and-literature teacher. Sister to the painter Leonid Pasternak and aunt to his writer son Boris Pasternak, Elizabeth died in her late 40s of cancer after unsuccessfully seeking treatment in Berlin.

In 1918, Hosiasson married Olga Bilinski. The following year his parents moved back to Riga, while Hosiasson and his new wife remained in Western Europe. In 1928, Hosiasson became a French citizen.

Early into World War II, Hosiasson joined the French army, but was seriously wounded near Dunkerque. He spent the Occupation in the south of France. By 1941, the inventory from his father's company had been confiscated, and Hosiasson's entire extended family had been murdered by the Nazis. Hosiasson returned to Paris in 1948.

== See also ==
- School of Paris
- New York School
- Abstract Expressionism
