= Waldemar George =

French Jewish Art Critique and historian

- Born: Jerzy Waldemar Jarociński; 10 January 1893; Łódź, Piotrków Governorate, Congress Poland
- Died: 27 October 1970 (aged 77); Paris, France
- Education: University of Paris
- Occupations: Art historian; art critic; writer
- Spouse: Claude Lavalley
- Parent: Stanisław Jarociński
- Relatives: Zygmunt Jarociński (grandfather); Maksymilian Goldfeder (uncle); Albert Jarociński (uncle); Krystyna Skarbek (first cousin once removed); Alexandre-Claude-Louis Lavalley (father-in-law); Pierre Lavalley (brother-in-law)

Waldemar George (10 January 1893 – 27 October 1970) was a Polish-born art historian and critic active primarily in France. Born Jerzy Waldemar Jarociński to Jewish parents. He originally had a passport issued by the Russian Empire, but gained naturalised French citizenship after serving in the French Army during the First World War.

He was active in the promotion of many artists of the School Of Paris. Frequently critiquing and writing of these artists which include Marc Chagall, Chaim Soutine, Isaac Frenkel and others.

== Biography ==
Jerzy Waldemar Jarociński was born on 10 January 1893 in Łódź, Congress Poland (present-day Poland) to a Polish-Jewish family. His mother was Regina Eugenia née Goldfeder, and his father was the industrialist and banker Stanisław Jarociński (1852-1934).

After studying literature at the University of Paris, he first appeared in La Revue in 1913, writing about European social events. In May 1914, he became art critic for La Phalange and reporter for Paris-Journal.

He assiduously frequented Parisian art circles and became an art critic, man of letters and journalist.

Waldemar-George was naturalized French after the First World War I for his voluntary enlistment in the French army in August 1914, and married Claude Lavalley (1902-1989) in Paris, daughter of painter Alexandre-Claude-Louis Lavalley (1862-1927), thus becoming the brother-in-law of painter Paul Lavalley (1883-1967).

He is the author of numerous monographs, as well as art essays theorizing the neo-humanist movement (Jean-Francis Laglenne, Christian Bérard, Léon Zack) or revealing young French artists linked to the School of Paris, such as Robert Lapoujade, Jewish artists like Marc Chagall, Alexandre Frenel or Chaïm Soutine, European artists like François Baron-Renouard and even Lebanese artists like Joseph Terdjan.

He edited three magazines: L'Amour de l'art (1920-1926) with Louis Vauxcelles, then Formes : revue internationale des arts plastiques (1929-1934), which merged with the former in 1935; Formes was founded by Wladimir Walter (1893-1966), a Russian-born art critic and publisher who founded the Galerie des Quatre-Chemins in Paris in 1924, publishing numerous essays; Waldemar-George was a close collaborator. Finally, Art et industrie, from 1945, with his friend Max Fourny, which in March 1956 became Prisme des arts.

During the German military administration in occupied France during World War II, Waldermar-George left Paris and went underground to escape the anti-Semitic laws. He returned to the capital in September 1944 and resumed his work as an art critic.

In 1958, he was scientific editor of the Encyclopédie de l'art international contemporain (Prisme des arts) alongside Max Fourny and Raymond Cogniat.

Ernest Jean-Marie Millard de Bois Durand called him “the most transcendent art critic”.
