= Jacob Mącznik =

Polish-French, Jewish artist (1905–1945)

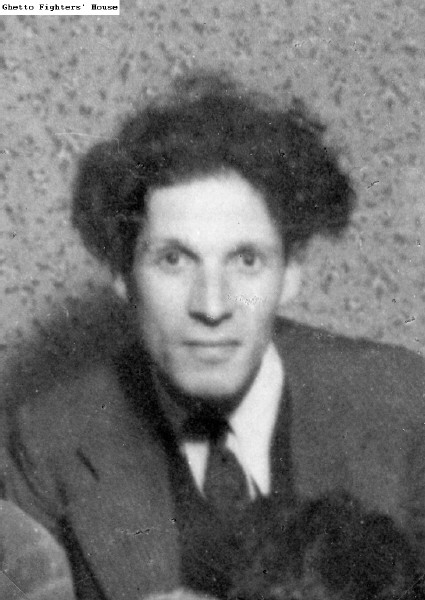
- Jakub Mącznik
- Born: 4 December 1905; Łódź, Poland
- Died: 10 May 1945 (aged 39); Ebensee, Austria
- Known for: painting
- Movement: École de Paris
- Spouse(s): Sonia, also known as Stella
- Children: none

Jacob Mącznik (4 December 1905 – 10 May 1945) was a Polish-French Jewish artist and a young painter associated with the École de Paris until its destruction during the Nazi occupation. Variations of his surname include Macznik, Moncznik, and Montchnik, while alternative forms of his given name include Jakub, Yankel, Jankel, Yakov, and Yank'l.

Édouard Roditi, the poet, essayist, surrealist author, scholar, critic, translator, and art historian, wrote that Mącznik was "among the more prominent artists who died as victims of Nazi extermination camps" and stated that, had he "lived to profit from the post-war international boom in contemporary art," he "might indeed have now enjoyed considerable fame."

Encyclopaedia Judaica notes, regarding victims of the École de Paris: "Among the more prominent artists who died as victims of Nazi extermination camps were [seventeen painters are then listed, including] '... Jacob Macznik 1905–1944 [sic] ...'" The entry continues: "These martyred artists were gifted with such outstanding and diverse talents that it would now be as unfair to try to force them all into a Jewish school as it was, under the Nazi regime, to deny them their human rights because they were Jews."

== Early life ==
Jacob Mącznik was born in Łódź, Poland, as the eldest of seven children in an Orthodox Aleksander Khassidic family. During the First World War, the family relocated to Potok, near Kielce, likely due to financial difficulties. While living in Kielce, Mącznik developed an interest in theatre and performed in amateur productions with friends. In 1921, the family returned to Łódź. There, Mącznik met an art student who inspired his interest in painting and brought him to Warsaw. Shortly after their arrival, the student had to leave for Danzig (now Gdańsk), leaving Mącznik alone in the city.

Mącznik studied at the School of Fine Arts and worked in Warsaw, but he eventually returned to Łódź out of homesickness, where he began painting. Several trips from Łódź awakened in him an appreciation for landscape painting.

In 1928, he married and moved with his wife to Paris. There, he painted and both he and his wife worked to support themselves.

== Artistic career in Paris ==
In 1931, Mącznik's works were first exhibited in Paris at the Jeune Europe gallery, a combined library and exhibition space owned and directed by Italian writer Antonio Aniante. In the exhibition catalogue, Aniante wrote:

The Young Europe is opening this year to present, first of all, the new paintings of the Polish painter Jacob Macznik, who is exhibiting for the first time in Paris at my place, in autumn 1931. I consider Macznik (along with Carlo Levi and Halé Asaf) as the best painter of my new avant-garde troupe. Macznik distinguishes himself by his surprising quality as a populist artist. He arises from the people and from suffering, but also from love. You will find in his paintings the joy of freedom and the charm of poverty rendered without any artifice. Macznik is a realist, full of honesty and faith. He is a poet, a thinker, a wise man who expresses himself through colour and form. Having understood his past, his present, and his future, and being the first to encourage it, to impress the crowd—this is the best book I have written this year.

The concept of "populism" in art, as used at the time, differed significantly from its modern political connotation. It was introduced around 1929 by French writers and critics André Thérive and Léon Lemonnier. According to William Leonard Schwartz, the term was considered the antonym of snobbism. Lemonnier defined it as:

"A reaction founded on the realistic tradition and directed against the literature of analysis. It is a call to an art based on observation and sincerity. It entails sympathy for the chosen subject matter and, in particular, sympathy for the people. It designates, on one hand, any work dealing with the common people, whatever its purpose may be, and on the other hand any book which is a continuation of the realistic tradition and which reacts against preciosity in thought or style. Populism is a return to reason."

In 1932, the critic Raymond Sélig wrote (translated from French):

"Près de la Fenêtre [Before the Window] and Vue d'une Fenêtre [View from a Window] are the titles of two deeply personal works by Jacob Macznik. In these compositions, filled with deep and lived emotion, the artist pursues his favourite artistic quest: to achieve extreme simplicity without sacrificing the expressive power of beauty in its most absolute and definitive form. The woman sitting by the window, reading intently, is truly sincere, while in the background, the usual Parisian rooftops and chimneys unfold."

Sélig noted that after arriving in Paris in 1928, Mącznik had little time to paint due to the need to work. Nonetheless, he wrote:

"He employs so perfectly the sparse bits of time that he is well spoken of, and in the process is building a reputation marked by an irresistible individualism and an innate personality—his two most precious qualities."

Mącznik had a solo exhibition at Jeune Europe from 15 October to 1 November 1932, and participated in a group show there in November the same year. He also exhibited at the Federation of Jewish Societies—though the exact year is uncertain, it was either 1932 or 1937. In addition, he exhibited at Galerie d'Art Jack in Nevers, France, from 13 September to 13 October 1935, alongside Mane-Katz, Flexor, and Dobrinsky. His works were included in the 1939 group exhibition at the Salon des Tuileries.

== Journey to Eastern Europe ==
According to artist Chil Aronson, writing in 1963, he suggested in 1936 that Mącznik travel to Poland to paint historic wooden synagogues. In contrast, writer Hersh Fenster claimed in his 1951 book that Mącznik himself proposed a joint trip in spring 1937, saying (translated from Yiddish), "I will paint there and you will write," and warning, "There will come a storm, and no traces will remain of them, of the Jewish monuments."

Mącznik and Fenster undertook the journey as a form of artistic resistance. Fenster recorded that Mącznik first visited Prague, where he painted the Old New Synagogue. Two paintings of the synagogue are known; one is missing, while the other remains in the collection of Mącznik's nephew, Samson Munn (USA). A photograph of Mącznik and Fenster taken in Sandomierz is preserved in the archives of the Museum of Art and History of Judaism (MAHJ); a facsimile is available online. Although Fenster's writings from the trip have never been recovered, two sets of Mącznik's watercolours and gouaches are known to survive. Additional details of the journey appear in Fenster's book.

== Later years and death ==
At the outbreak of the Second World War in September 1939, Mącznik and his wife were in Auvergne, France. Rather than return to Paris, they travelled to Toulouse and were later assigned forced housing in Loures-Barousse, in the Pyrenées. According to some accounts, Mącznik either joined or attempted to join the French resistance.

In September 1943, Chil Aronson reportedly encountered Mącznik and his wife by chance in a café in Nice. Within a day, arrests began. Mącznik and his wife were arrested and deported to the Drancy internment camp on 1 October 1943, arriving on 5 October. He was deported from Drancy to Auschwitz on 28 October 1943 aboard transport 901/51, arriving on 31 October.

On 18 January 1945, as Soviet forces approached, Mącznik was forced on a "death march" through blizzard conditions to a train that brought him to the Mauthausen concentration camp. He arrived on 25 January, and was transferred four days later to the Ebensee subcamp, a slave-labour division of Mauthausen. He died in Ebensee on 10 May 1945, four days after the camp was liberated by Allied forces.
