= Zygmunt Menkes =

Polish-Jewish modern artist

Zygmunt (Sigmund) Menkes
- Born: May 6, 1896; Lemberg, Kingdom of Galicia and Lodomeria
- Died: August 20, 1986 (aged 90); New York City, New York
- Education: Academy of Fine Arts, Krakow
- Movement: School of Paris

Zygmunt (Sigmund) Menkes (May 6, 1896 – August 20, 1986) was a Polish-Jewish modern painter and a member of the School of Paris during the 1920s and 1930s. Menkes emigrated to the United States in 1935 where he remained active until his death in 1986. His later work has been associated with colorist painting and expressionism.

== Life and work ==
Zygmunt Menkes was born in Lemberg on May 6, 1896. He studied at the Academy of Fine Arts, Krakow, graduating in 1922, before moving to Berlin and then Paris in 1923. He became a member of Ecole de Paris, an artistic community of avant-garde artists from around Europe, primarily from Central and Eastern Europe, working together in Paris in a variety of figurative styles. He developed close friendships with Eugeniusz Zak and Marc Chagall. Menkes participated in numerous salons between 1924 and 1928 in Paris, including multiple times in Salon d'Automne and Salon Des Independants.

Menkes moved to the United States in 1935, where he worked with the Associated American Artists and became a lecturer at the Art Students League of New York. He continued to exhibit in the U.S. and Europe, joining the colorist group known as Nowa Generacja (New Generation) and Zwornik (Keystone) in the 1930s. In the U.S., he was awarded the Carol H. Beck Medal of the Pennsylvania Academy of Fine Arts in 1943, the Gold Medal of the Corcoran Gallery in 1947, the Andrew Carnegie Award of the National Academy of Design in 1955, and the Alfred Jurzykowski Award in 1967. He died at the age of 91 on August 20, 1986 in New York of a heart attack. His works are in permanent collections located in many locations including, but not limited to: The Philadelphia Museum of Art, the Whitney Museum of American Art in New York, the Jewish Museum in New York, and the Tel Aviv Museum of Art.
