= Amshey Nurenberg =

Soviet painter (1887–1979)

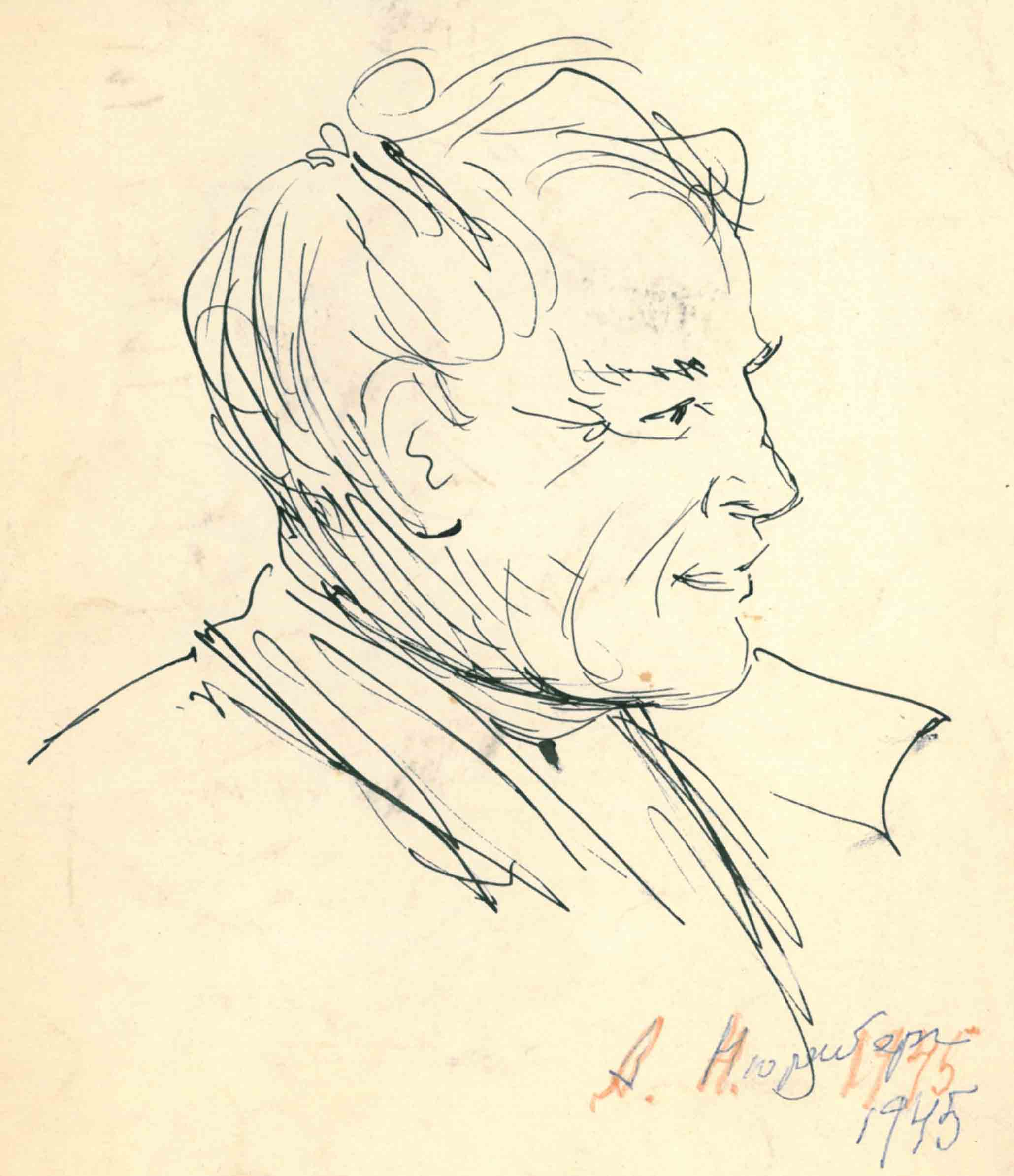
- A.Nurenberg. 1945. Self-portrait. Paper, Indian ink. 25.5x18.5
- Born: Amshey Markovich Nurenberg; April 17, 1887; Elisavetgrad
- Died: 10 January 1979 (aged 91)
- Education: Odessa School of Arts
- Movement: School of Paris

Amshey Markovich Nurenberg (Russian: Амшей Маркович Нюренберг; April 17, 1887 – 10 January 1979) was a Ukrainian, Russian and Soviet painter, graphic artist, art critic, and memoirist. He was an adherent of the School of Paris.

During his life, Nurenberg worked in different styles—from avant-garde to realism, having always remained faithful to traditions of the School of Paris.

== Biography ==
He was born on 21 April 1887, in Elisavetgrad (now Kropyvnytskyi) in a Jewish family. His parents were fishmongers. Amshey was the eldest of 10 children; one of his brothers, David Devinov, also was an artist. In 1905 he graduated from the Elisavetgrad lycée, where the arts were taught by Ilya Repin's apprentice Feodosiy Kozachinsky.

From 1905 to 1911 he studied at the Odessa School of Arts in the class of Professor Kyriak Kostandi.

From 1911 to 1913 he lived in Paris, where he studied in private art academies. He worked as an art correspondent for a Russian-language newspaper, "Paris Bulletin" (Russian: Парижский вестник, romanized: Parizhskiy vestnik). He shared an atelier with M.Chagall in the phalanstère La Ruche in the Passage de Dantzig.

In 1913 he returned to Elisavetgrad, where he worked as a teacher.

In 1915 he moved to Odessa, where he staged joint exhibitions with a group of modernists called later "Odessa Parisians". He founded the Organisation of the "Society of the Independent", which transformed in 1918 into the "Association of Independent Artists".

In 1915 he married the ballerina Polina Mamicheva (1894–1978).

In 1919 he was appointed the People's Commissar of Arts of Odessa and the head of the Committee for Protecting Artistic and Historic Heritage.

From 1919 to 1920 he was editor-in-chief of the first Soviet newspaper in Elisavetgrad "Red village" (Красная деревня)

In 1920 he moved to Moscow, where he worked in the ROSTA Windows together with Vladimir Mayakovsky, Ivan Maljutin, and Mikhail Cheremnykh; making over 200 posters.

From 1922 to 1924 he was professor of history of Western art at the VKhUTEMAS. In 1923 Nurenberg's daughter Nina was born; she would grow up to be a soloist of the Bolshoi Theater under the stage name Nina Nelina.

From 1923 to 1925 he staged joint exhibitions with the former members of the group Knave of Diamonds (1910–17) and writing the art manifesto for their new society Moscow Painters under the chairmanship of Pyotr Konchalovsky

From 1924 to 1926 he was the first art columnist of the newspaper Pravda.

He was evacuated to Tashkent during World War II, where he worked at the Uzbek Union of Soviet Artists. He returned to Moscow in 1943, where he worked for the Museum of Revolution. He retired in the 1950s. He continued his artistic and literary life, including participation in exhibitions, writing memoirs, and publications in newspapers and journals.

He died on 10 January 1979. He is buried at the Vagankovo cemetery.

== Gallery ==
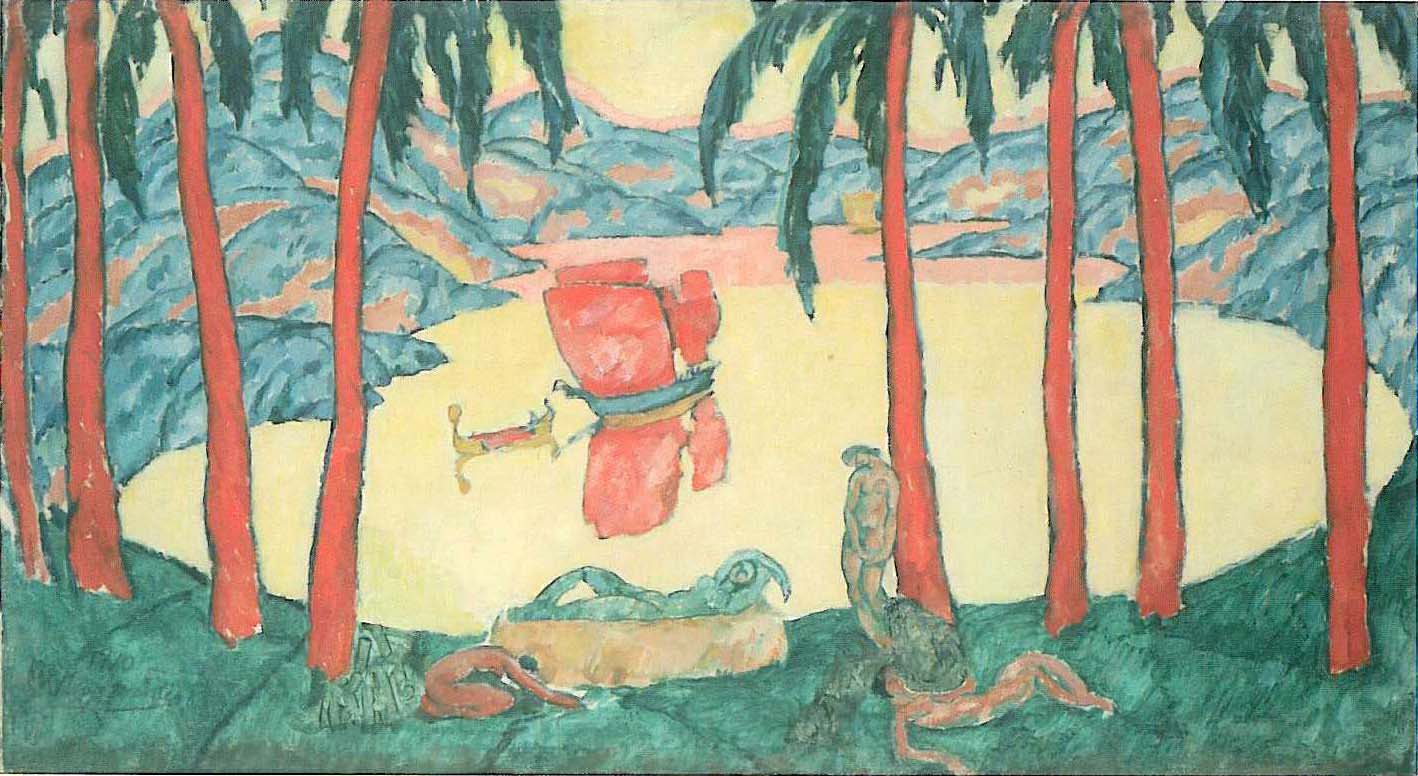
A.Nurenberg. 1910. Red sails. Oil on canvas. 68x123 (the title is used by Alexander Grin for the novel "Red sails", 1923)

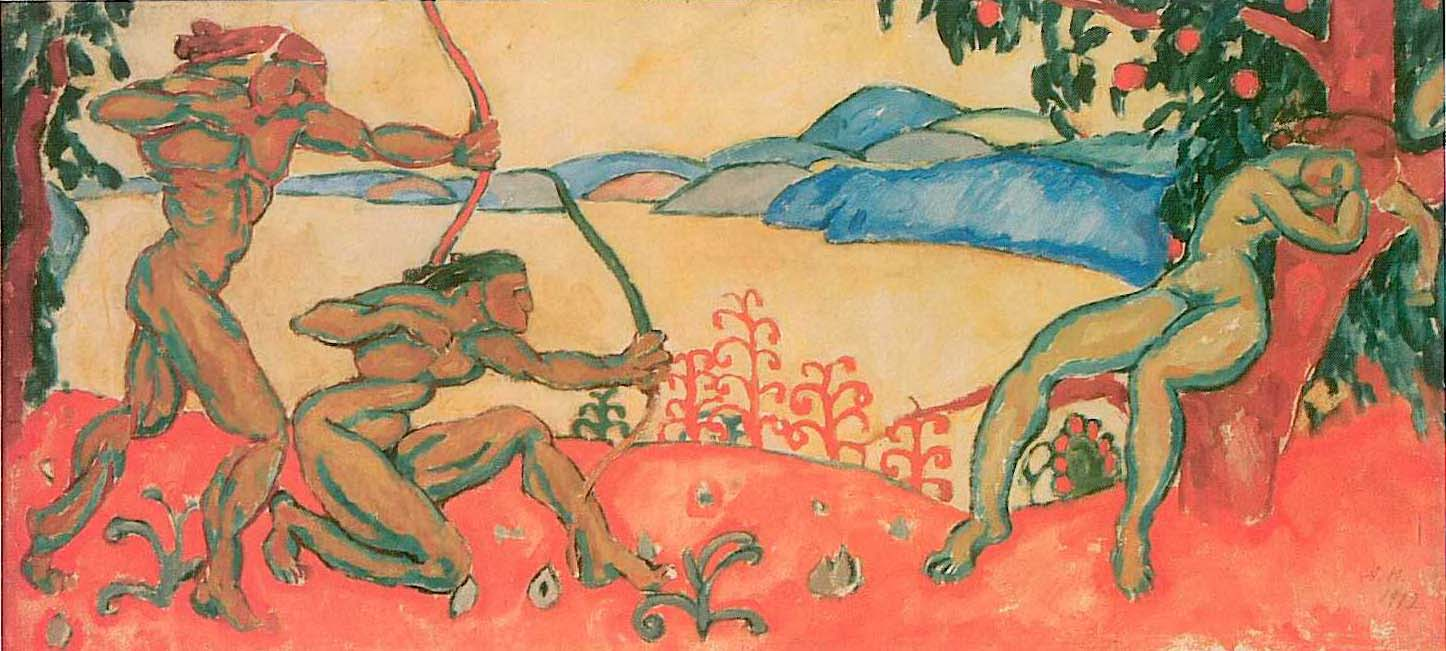
A.Nurenberg. 1912. The hunt. An antique motive. Oil on canvas. 56x120

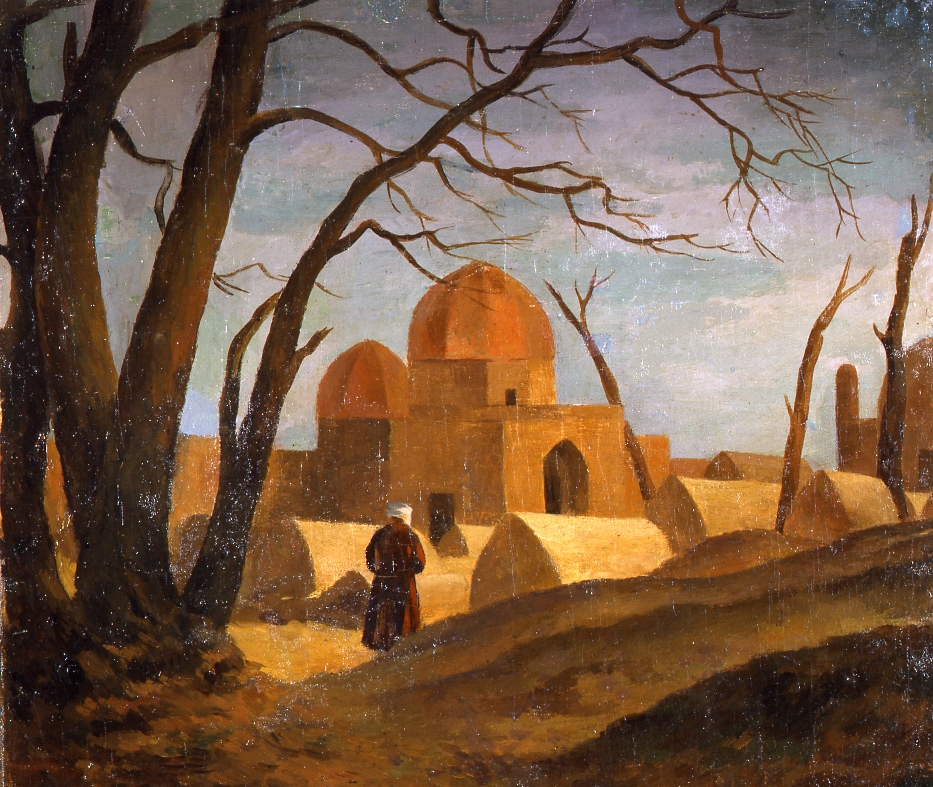
A.Nurenberg. 1923. Mosque with a man figure. Oil on canvas. 33x40

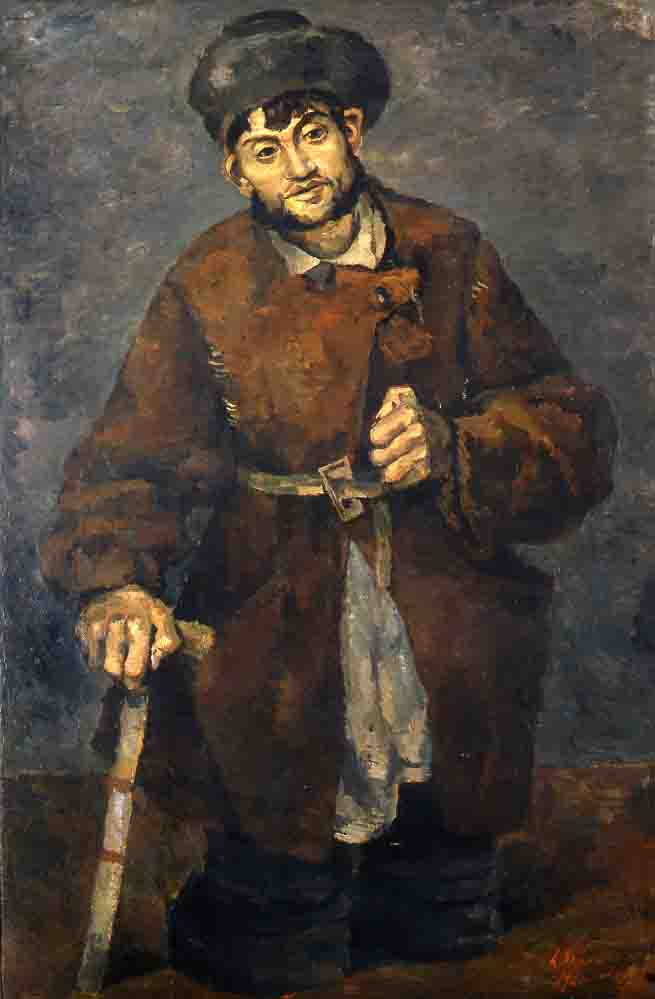
А.Nurenberg. 1926. War-disabled. Oil on cartoon. 91x60. Exhibited at the Salon d'Automne, Paris 1927

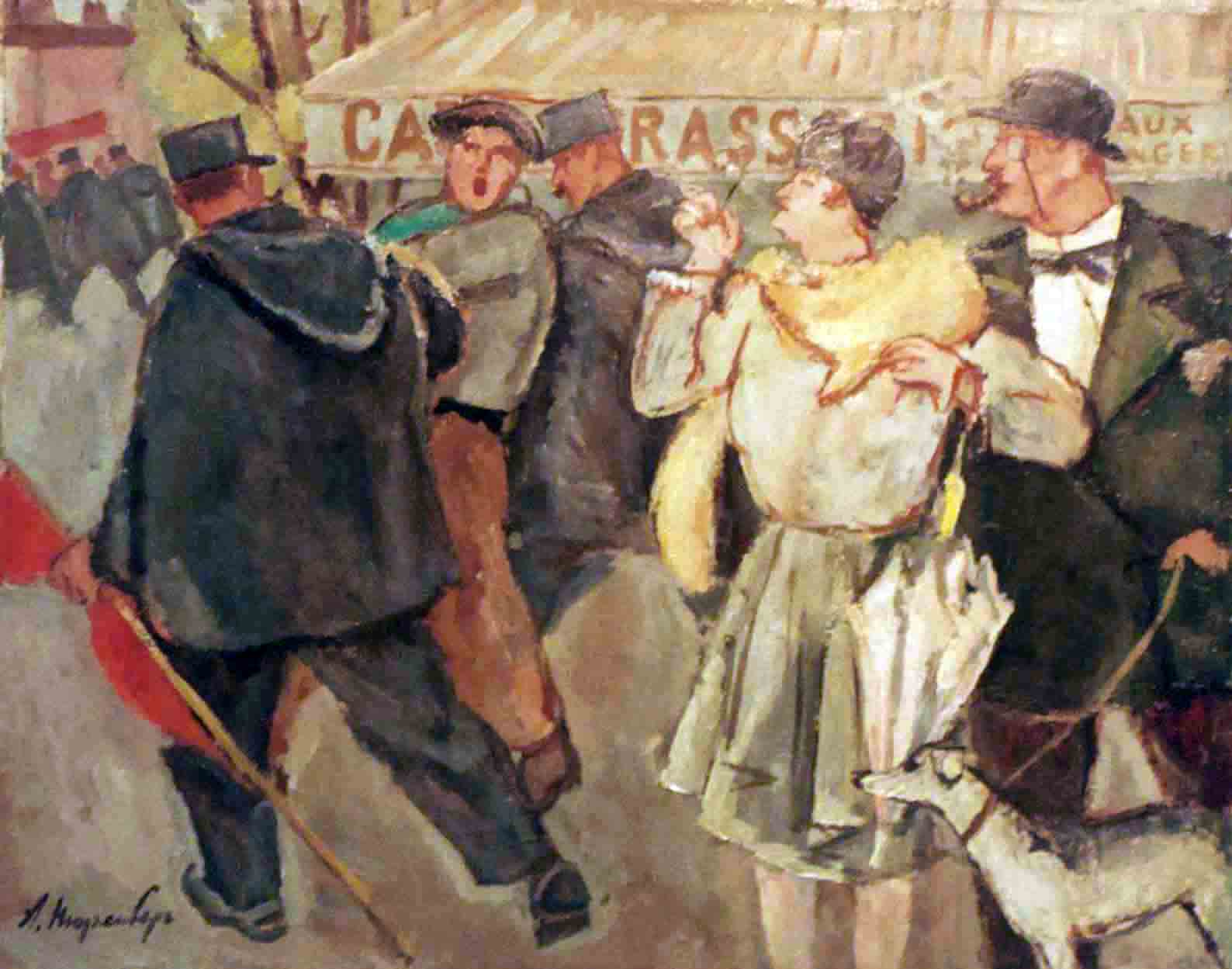
A.Nurenberg. 1929–1930. Bourgeois swines. Oil on canvas. 63x80. Moscow, Tretyakov Gallery

== Works in museums ==
- Moscow, State Tretyakov Gallery: 67 works, including paintings Bourgeois Swines (1929–30), Supper (1930), Socialist contract (1931)
- Moscow, State Pushkin Museum of Fine Arts: 45 works
- Moscow, Mayakovsky Museum: 14 works, portraits of Mayakovsky of different years
- Moscow, State Museum of the East Nations Art: 69 works, Asia works of 1920s and 1940s
- Moscow, State Central Museum of Modern History of Russia (former Museum of Revolution): portraits of Lenin, revolution and antimilitary works
- Moscow, Central Armed Forces Museum (former Museum of Red Army): painting Happy Youth (1936)
- Kiev, National Art Museum of Ukraine: 39 works
- Kirovograd (Ukraine), Regional Art Museum: 102 works
- Nukus (Uzbekistan), State Art Museum of the Republic of Karakalpakstan named after I. V. Savitsky: about 60 works
- Ramat Gan (Israel), about 20 works
- Minneapolis (USA), The Museum of Russian Art (TMORA): 15 works

== Exhibitions ==
- 1908, Odessa. Exhibition of the Association of South-Russian Artists (ТЮРХ)
- 1913, Jelisavetgrad. First Jelisavetgrad Art Exhibition
- 1916, Odessa. Exhibition of the Society of the Independent
- 1918, Odessa. Exhibition of the Association of Independent Artists
- 1919, Odessa. First People's Exhibition
- 1920, Odessa. Exhibition in Memory of T.Shevchenko
- 1922, Moscow. Exhibition of the New Society of Painting (НОЖ)
- 1924, Moscow. Joint exhibition of drawings and water-colours with Robert Falk and Alexander Shevchenko at the State Tsvetkov Art Gallery
- 1927, Paris. Salon d'automne
- 1929, Moscow. Exhibition «ROSTA Satiric Windows» at the State Tretyakov Gallery
- 1932, Venice. Biennale
- 1939, Moscow. Industry of Socialism
- 1945, Moscow. Personal exhibition at the Central House of Writers (ZDL)
- 1961, Moscow. Personal exhibition at the Moscow Department of the Union of Artiststs of the RSFSR (МОСХ РСФСР)
- 1963, Odessa. Personal exhibition
- 1979, Moscow. Posthumous personal exhibition at the Moscow Department of the Organisation of the Union of Artists of the RSFSR (МОСХ, Беговая ул. 7–9)
- 1988, Moscow. Exhibition of the Nukus Art Museum at the State Museum of the East Nations Art (currently State Museum of Oriental Art)
- 2004, Moscow. Exhibition of Brothers Amshey Nurenberg and David Devinov-Nurenberg at the gallery «Kovcheg»
- 2006, Ramat Gan (Israel). Exhibition «Odesa Parisians» at the Maria & Michael Zetlin Museum of Russian Art
- 2009, Kirovohrad (since 2016 Kropyvnytskyi), Ukraine. Personal exhibition at the [Kirovohrad Regional Art Museum https://usefultravelarticles.com/6739-kirovograd-regional-art-museum-description-and-photo-ukraine-kirovograd.html]
- 2009, Odesa. Personal exhibition at the World Club of Odessians
- 2010, Kyiv. Exhibition of works of the Society of Independent Artists from the collection of Jacob Peremen at the Bohdan and Varvara Khanenko National Museum of Arts
- 2011, New York. Exhibition «Ukrainian Avant-Garde: Odesa Parisians» at the National Arts Club.
- 2013, Kyiv. Exhibition "Society of the Independent" at the National Art Museum of Ukraine
- 2014, Odesa. Exhibition "They are back!" at the Museum of Odesa modern art
- 2020, Moscow. Personal Exhibition of works of Nurenberg at the State Museum of Oriental Art
- 2021, Moscow. Exhibition "Give Kuzbass! To the 300th anniversary of Kuzbass" (Russian: "Даешь Кузбасс! К 300-летию Кузбасса") at the State Tretyakov Gallery
- 2021, Kemerovo. Exhibition "Building Kuzbass, building the country!" (Russian: "Строим Кузбасс, строим страну!") at the Kemerovo Regional Museum of Fine Arts
- 2021, Odesa. Exhibition "Yesterday, today, always" at the Museum of Odesa modern art

== Membership in artistic unions ==
- 1910, Odessa. Association of South-Russian Artists (ТЮРХ)
- 1915–18, Odessa. Society of the Independent
- 1918–19, Odessa. Association of Independent Artists
- 1921–22, Моscow. New Society of Painting (НОЖ)
- 1926–27, Моscow. Association of artists of the revolutionary Russia (АХРР)
- 1932–79, Моscow. Moscow Regional Union of Soviet Artists (МОССХ), later renamed into Moscow Union of Soviet Artists (МССХ), Moscow Department of the Union of Artiststs of the RSFSR (МОСХ РСФСР), and Moscow Department of the Organisation of the Union of Artists of the RSFSR (МОСХ)

== Books (Russian) ==
- V. Midler and A. Nurenberg (1922) Samarkand and Tashkent. Moscow - Tashkent, Risolya (Russian)
- A. Nurenberg (1924) Paul Cézanne. Moscow, VKhUTEMAS
- A. Nurenberg (1969). Reminiscences, acquaintances, thoughts about arts. Moscow, Soviet Artist (Russian: А. М. Нюренберг. Воспоминания, встречи, мысли об искусстве. Москва, Советский художник. 1969)
- A. Nuerenberg (2010) Odessa — Paris — Moscow. Memoirs of an artist. Editing and introductory article by O. Tangian. Concluding article by L. Voiskoun. Moscow, Gesharim (Russian)

== Sources ==
- A. Nurenberg (1969). Reminiscences, acquaintances, thoughts about arts. Moscow, Soviet Artist (Russian: А. М. Нюренберг. Воспоминания, встречи, мысли об искусстве. Москва, Советский художник. 1969)
- A. Nurenberg (1994). Stories of an old artist. Time and ourselves (New York - Moscow), No. 124, 225–261, and No. 126, 216–259 (Russian: А. М. Нюренберг (1994). Рассказы старого художника. Время м мы (Нью-Йорк - Москва), №124, 225 - 261 и № 126, стр. 215 - 261)
- Odessa Parisians. Works of artists-modernists from the collection of Jacob Peremen (2006). Museum of Russian Art, Ramat-Gan, and publisher "Cultural bridges", Moscow (Одесские парижане. Произведения художников-модернистов из коллекции Якова Перемена (2006). Музей русского искусства, Рамат-Ган, и издательство "Мосты культуры", Москва. 2006)
- A.Nurenberg (2007). Odessa - Paris - Moscow. Reminiscences of an artist. Deribasovskaya - Rishelyevskaya. Odessa Anthology, Book 30, 208–225. (А. М. Нюренберг (2007). Одесса - Париж - Москва. Воспоминания художника. Дерибасовская - Ришельевская. Одесский альманах. Книга 30, стр. 208 - 225
- A. Nuerenberg (2010) Odessa — Paris — Moscow. Memoires of an artist. Editing and introductory article by O. Tangian. Concluding article by L. Voiskoun. Moscow, Mosty cultury - Gesharim (Russian)
- Amshey Nurenberg, about him (2008). Maslovka - Residence of Artists
- O. Tangian (2009). "Odessa Parisan" A.Nurenberg. Deribasovskaya - Rishelyevskaya. Odessa Anthology, Book 37, 182–206 (О. Тангян (2009). "Одесский парижанин" А.Нюренберг. Дерибасовская - Ришельевская. Одесский альманах. Книга 37, стр. 182 - 206)
