= Isaac Dobrinsky =

- Born: 1891; Makarov, Russian Empire (Today Ukraine)
- Died: 1973 (aged 81–82)
- Education: Sabatovski art school
- Movement: École de Paris

Isaac Dobrinsky (1891–1973) was a Polish-French sculptor and painter of the School of Paris.

== Early life ==
He was born in the Polish city of Makarov, Kyiv province, now in Ukraine. His father was a religiously observant Jew and he himself was brought up in a traditional way: he studied in a "Heder" (Jewish elementary school) and in a "Yeshiva" (Jewish high school). He always found himself attracted to art. After his father’s sudden death he moved to Kyiv to study sculpture.

== Education and career ==
Dobrinsky lived in Kyiv for six years. He began sculpting terracotta figures, and enrolled in Sabatovski art school. He worked as a storekeeper in a tin can factory during this period. In 1912, he won a prize for his sculpture which allowed him to move to Paris where he lived until his death in 1973.

Upon his arrival in France, he became friends with the sculptor Marec Szwarc and the painter Chaïm Soutine who helped him settle down in Paris and shared their studio with him. Dobrinsky abandoned sculpture in favor of painting a year after his arrival, as a result of ill health. His first painting was shown at the Salon d'Automne a few months later.

In 1914, he joined the French Foreign Legion, but he was soon released on medical discharge.

He then returned to Paris and attended the Colarossi Academy, where he met Vera Kremer (her father, Arkadi Kremer, was the founder of the Bund, the Jewish socialist party in Eastern Europe). The two got married in 1926.

In 1934, he moved to a larger studio in Montparnasse, and in the next few years he made his major breakthrough in the art scene. These were happy days for the young couple, full of creativity. But Second World War put an end to this harmony. In the first two years of the German occupation, Dobrinsky and his family stayed in Paris, but in 1942, in order to escape deportation, they fled to a small village Dordogne.

In 1944, after the liberation, Dobrinsky returned to Paris to find that the sculptures he had left behind were destroyed. In 1950, he was invited by Serge and Rachel Pludermacher (the founders of an orphan home) to paint the portraits of the children in their institute. In the course of two years, Dobrinsky worked on about forty portraits of young boys and girls.

Dobrinsky used to say: "I don’t wish to be successful, I just wish to understand the mystery of creation". Those who knew Dobrinsky say that there was something almost religious in his act of painting: very intimate and somewhat melancholic.

Even though he had a heart condition during his last years, he had never stopped painting, and always in the same manner. When he died at the age of 81, he was working on a still life painting. Today he is remembered for his paintings rather than his sculptures.
