= School of Paris =

Early 20th century group of artists

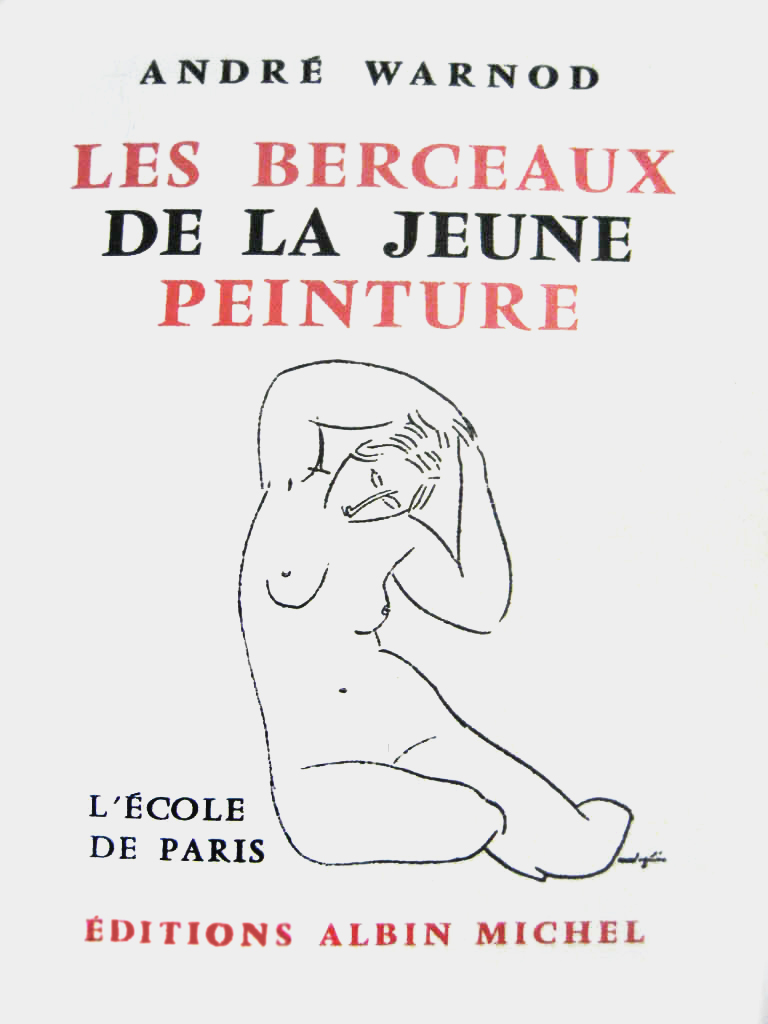
- André Warnod, Les Berceaux de la jeune peinture, 1925. Cover illustration by Amedeo Modigliani
- Years active: 1900–1940
- Location: France, Israel, United States
- Major figures: Marc Chagall, Chaïm Soutine, Yitzhak Frenkel, Jules Pascin, Amedeo Modigliani
- Influences: Salon du Champs-de-Mars, Vienna Secession, Munich Secession
- Influenced: New York School

The School of Paris (French: École de Paris, pronounced [ekɔl də paʁi]) refers to the French and émigré artists who worked in Paris in the first half of the 20th century. Never a single art movement or institution, the term "School of Paris" refers instead to the primacy of Paris as the centre of Western art between 1900 and 1940.

Artists of Jewish origin always figured prominently in the School of Paris. Before 1917, Jews faced restrictions in mobility within the Pale of Settlement and strict quotas or outright bans from studying art in the Russian Empire's most illustrious art schools in St. Petersburg and Moscow. So many got their start in Odesa, Vilnius, Kyiv, and Munich before moving to Paris for reasons that included artistic ambition, a desire to escape the pogroms of the Russian Empire, and the hope that the exoneration of Dreyfus in 1906 was "a sign that eventually the state would in fact side with justice and inclusion." In the 1930s and 1940s, many of these artists immigrated to the United States and Israel where they went on to heavily influence modern art.

Art critic André Warnod first coined École de Paris to describe the mainly Jewish group of immigrant artists that included Jules Pascin, Yitzhak Frenkel, Chaïm Soutine, Marc Chagall and others in 1925. But it was always an elastic classification, encompassing a loose community, particularly of non-French artists, centred in the cafes, salons and shared workspaces and galleries of Montparnasse. Before World War I, it was also applied to artists involved in the many collaborations and overlapping new art movements, between Post-Impressionists and Pointillism and Orphism, Fauvism and Cubism in the well-established art scene in Montmartre.

In its broader sense, the group included artists like Pablo Picasso, Marc Chagall, Amedeo Modigliani, and Piet Mondrian, and associated French artists, such as Pierre Bonnard, Henri Matisse, Jean Metzinger, and Albert Gleizes. In its more narrow sense, it described Chagall and Modigliani as prominent members of the early school, and Picasso and Matisse as its twin pre-war leaders (chefs d'école). By the 1920s, Montparnasse had become a centre of the avant-garde, so the name was also used to refer to that group. After World War II, the name was also applied to a group of abstract artists and a group of émigré classical composers.

== La Ruche ==
Many École de Paris artists lived in the iconic La Ruche, a complex of studio apartments and other facilities in Montparnasse on the Left Bank, at 2 Passage Dantzig, built by a successful sculptor, Alfred Boucher, who wanted to develop a creative hub where struggling artists could live, work and interact. Built from materials dismantled from the Medoc Wine Pavilion from the 1900 Paris World's Fair, it comprised 50 modest studios with large windows that let in a lot of light, with nearby buildings providing 50 more studios for the overflow of artists. Boucher called the complex La Ruche — French for "beehive" — because he wanted the artists to work like bees in a beehive; he dedicated a large room in the complex where the poorer artists could draw a model that he paid for, and included a small theatre space for plays and concerts.

La Ruche opened in 1902, with the blessing of the French government. It was often the first destination of émigré artists who arrived in Paris eager to join the art scene and find affordable housing. Living and working in close quarters, many artists forged lasting friendships, e.g., Chaïm Soutine with Modigliani, Chagall and poet Blaise Cendrars, and influenced each other's work. Artists who lived and worked in La Ruche include Amedeo Modigliani, Yitzhak Frenkel, Diego Rivera, Tsuguharu Foujita, Jacob, Soutine, Michel Kikoine, Moïse Kisling, Pinchus Krémègne, Ossip Zadkine, Jules Pascin, Marc Chagall, Amshey Nurenberg, Jacques Lipchitz, and more.

== After World War I ==
Raoul Dufy, Regatta at Cowes (1934), National Gallery of Art Washington

Sonia Delaunay, Rythme (1938)

The term "School of Paris," which André Warnod had used innocently to refer to the many foreign-born artists who had migrated to Paris, soon gained currency, often as a derogatory label by critics who saw the foreign artists — many of whom were Jewish — as a threat to the purity of French art. Art critic Louis Vauxcelles, noted for coining the terms "Fauvism" and "Cubism" (also meant disparagingly), called immigrant artists unwashed "Slavs disguised as representatives of French art". Waldemar George, himself a French Jew, in 1931 lamented that the term "allows any artist to pretend he is French ... it refers to French tradition but instead annihilates it."

School of Paris artists were progressively marginalised. Beginning in 1935, articles about Chagall no longer appeared in art publications (apart from those published for Jewish audiences) and, by June 1940, when the Vichy government took power, School of Paris artists could no longer exhibit in Paris at all.

The artists working in Paris between World War I and World War II experimented with various styles including Cubism, Orphism, Surrealism and Dada. Foreign and French artists working in Paris included Jean Arp, Joan Miró, Constantin Brâncuși, Raoul Dufy, Tsuguharu Foujita, artists from Belarus like Michel Kikoine, Pinchus Kremegne, the Lithuanian Jacques Lipchitz and Arbit Blatas, who documented some of the greatest representatives of the School of Paris in his oeuvre, the Polish artists Marek Szwarc and Morice Lipsi and others such as Russian-born prince Alexis Arapoff.

A significant subset, the Jewish artists, came to be known as the "Jewish School of Paris" or the "School of Montparnasse." The "core members were almost all Jews, and the resentment expressed toward them by French critics in the 1930s was unquestionably fuelled by anti-Semitism." One account points to the 1924 Salon des Indépendants, which decided to separate the works of French-born artists from those by immigrants; in response, critic Roger Allard referred to them as the School of Paris. Jewish members of the group included Emmanuel Mané-Katz, Abraham Mintchine, Chaïm Soutine, Adolphe Féder, Marc Chagall, Yitzhak Frenkel Frenel, Moïse Kisling, Maxa Nordau and Shimshon Holzman.

The artists of the Jewish School of Paris were stylistically diverse. Some, like Louis Marcoussis, worked in a Cubist style, but most tended toward expression of mood rather than an emphasis on formal structure. Their paintings often feature thickly brushed or trowelled impasto. The Musée d'Art et d'Histoire du Judaïsme has works from School of Paris artists including Pascin, Kikoine, Soutine, Mintchine, Orloff and Lipschitz.

== Jewish School of Paris ==
=== France ===
Artists of Jewish origin had a marked influence in the École de Paris. Paris, the capital of the art world, attracted Jewish artists from Eastern Europe, some fleeing persecution, discrimination and pogroms. Many of these artists settled in Montparnasse. Several Jewish painters were notable in the movement; these include Marc Chagall and Jules Pascin, the expressionists Chaïm Soutine and Isaac Frenkel Frenel as well as Amedeo Modigliani and Abraham Mintchine. Many Jewish artists were known for depicting Jewish themes in their work, and some artists' paintings were imbued with heavy emotional tones. Frenkel described the artists as "members of the minority characterised by restlessness whose expressionism is therefore extreme in its emotionalism".

The term l'École de Paris coined by the art critic André Warnod in 1925 in the magazine Comœdia, was intended by Warnod to negate xenophobic attitudes towards the foreign artists, many of whom were Eastern European Jews. Louis Vauxcelles, a prolific critic of Jewish painters, wrote several monographs for the publisher Le Triangle. In a 1931 monograph, he wrote: "like a swarm of locusts, an invasion of Jewish colourists fell on Paris — on the Paris of Montparnasse. The causes of this exodus: the Russian Revolution, and all that it brought with it of misery, pogroms, exactions, persecutions; the unfortunate young artists take refuge here, attracted by the influence of contemporary French art. [...] They will constitute [an element of] what the young critic will call the School of Paris. Many talents are to be considered in this crowd of what is nowadays sometimes referred to as outsider art or métèque art.

Following the Nazi occupation of France, several prominent Jewish artists died during the Holocaust, leading to the dwindling of the Jewish School of Paris. Others managed to leave or fled Europe, mostly to Mandate Palestine or the US.

=== Israel ===
Jewish art in Mandate Palestine was predominantly inspired by the École de Paris between the 1920s and 1940s, with French art continuing to strongly influence Israeli art for the following decades. This phenomenon began with the return of École de Paris Yitzhak Frenkel to Mandatory Palestine in 1925 and his opening of the Histadrut Art Studio. His students were encouraged to continue their studies in Paris, and upon their return to Pre-Independence Israel amplified the influence of the Jewish artists of the School of Paris they encountered.

These artists, centred in Montparnasse in Paris, and in Tel Aviv and Safed in Israel, tended to portray humanity and the emotion evoked through human facial expression. Furthermore, as is characteristic of Jewish Parisian Expressionism, the art was dramatic and even tragic, perhaps in connection to the suffering of the Jewish soul. During the 1930s several such painters would paint scenes in the Land of Israel in an Impressionist style and a Parisian light, greyer and dimmer compared to the powerful Mediterranean sun.

==== Artists Quarter of Safed ====
Safed, a city in the mountains of Galilee and one of the Four Holy Cities of Judaism, was a centre of École de Paris artists during the mid- and late 20th century. Artists were attracted there by the romantic and mystical qualities of the Kabbalistic mountain city. The artists' quarter, founded in 1949, was formed at first by Moshe Castel, Shimshon Holzman, Yitzhak Frenkel, and other artists, many of them influenced by, or part of, the School of Paris. Though not united by a common artistic trope, it was a clear bastion of École de Paris in the country.

The painters of the community who were influenced by the Ecole de Paris attempted to express or reflect the mystics of Safed (Hebrew: Tzfat). Painting with colours that reflect the dynamism and spirituality of the ancient city, painting the fiery or serene sunsets over Mount Meron. Marc Chagall would walk the streets and paint portraits of religious children. Several of these artists would commute between Safed and Paris.

== Musicians ==
In the same period, the School of Paris name was also extended to an informal association of classical composers, émigrés from Central and Eastern Europe to who met at the Café Du Dôme in Montparnasse. They included Alexandre Tansman, Alexander Tcherepnin, Bohuslav Martinů, and Tibor Harsányi. Unlike Les Six, another group of Montparnasse musicians at this time, the musical School of Paris was a loosely-knit group that did not adhere to any particular stylistic orientation.

== After World War II ==
In the aftermath of the war, "nationalistic and anti-Semitic attitudes were discredited, and the term took on a more general use denoting both foreign and French artists in Paris". But although the "Jewish problem" trope continued to surface in public discourse, art critics ceased making ethnic distinctions in using the term. While in the early 20th century French art critics contrasted The School of Paris and the École de France, after World War II the question was School of Paris vs School of New York.

=== New School of Paris ===
Post-World War II (Après-guerre), the term "New School of Paris" or École de Paris III often referred to tachisme, and lyrical abstraction, a European parallel to US Abstract Expressionism. These artists include again foreign ones and are also related to CoBrA (Copenhagen-Bruxelles-Amsterdam). Important proponents were Jean Dubuffet, Jean Fautrier, Pierre Soulages, Nicolas de Staël, Hans Hartung, Wols, Serge Poliakoff, Bram van Velde, Max Ernst, Simon Hantaï, Gérard Schneider, Maria Helena Vieira da Silva, Zao Wou-Ki, Chu Teh-Chun, Georges Mathieu, André Masson, Jean Degottex, Pierre Tal-Coat, Jean Messagier, Alfred Manessier, Jean Le Moal, Olivier Debré, Zoran Mušič, Jean-Michel Coulon, and Fahrelnissa Zeid, among others. Many of their exhibitions took place at the Galerie de France in Paris, and then at the Salon de Mai, where a group of them exhibited until the 1970s.

In 1996, UNESCO organised the 50th anniversary of the School of Paris (1954–1975), bringing together "100 painters of the New School of Paris." Notable artists included Arthur Aesbacher, Jean René Bazaine, Leonardo Cremonini, Olivier Debré, Chu Teh-Chun, Jean Piaubert, Jean Cortot, Zao Wou-ki, François Baron-Renouard, among others. This grand exhibition featured a hundred painters from 28 different countries at the UNESCO Headquarters in Paris. The exhibition's curators were the art critics Henry Galy-Carles and Lydia Harambourg.

== Art critics ==
Art critics and renowned writers have written prefaces, books, and articles regarding the painters of the School of Paris, notably in periodicals such as Libération, Le Figaro, Le Peintre, Combat, Les Lettres Françaises, Les Nouvelles littéraires. Among these writers and critiques were Waldemar George, Georges-Emmanuel Clancier, Jean-Paul Crespelle, Arthur Conte, Robert Beauvais, Jean Lescure, Jean Cassou, Bernard Dorival, André Warnod, Jean-Pierre Pietri, George Besson, Georges Boudaille, Jean-Albert Cartier, Jean Chabanon, Raymond Cogniat, Guy Dornand, Jean Bouret, Raymond Charmet, Florent Fels, Georges Charensol, Frank Elgar, Roger van Gindertael, Georges Limbour, and Marcel Zahar.

== Selected artists ==
- Michel Adlen (1898–1980), born a Ukrainian Jew in the Russian Empire, moved to Paris in 1923
- Constantin Brâncuși (1876–1957), Romanian-born sculptor, considered a pioneer of modernism. Arrived in Paris in 1904.
- Bernard Cathelin
- Marc Chagall (1887–1985), lived in Paris from 1910 to 1914 then again after his exile from the Soviet Union in 1923; Jewish; was arrested in Marseilles by the Vichy government but escaped to the US with help from Alfred H. Barr Jr., director of the Museum of Modern Art, and collectors Louise and Walter Arensberg, among others
- Émilie Charmy (1878–1974), French painter, who was exhibited by the Parisian dealer and collector Berthe Weill
- Giorgio de Chirico (1888–1978), Italian who showed the first signs of magical realism later highlighted in Surrealist works, lived in Paris 1911–1915 and again in the 1920s
- Jean-Michel Coulon, French painter, had the particularity of having kept his work almost secret over his lifetime
- Geoffroy Dauvergne, French Painter, Sculptor and Mosaic artist.
- Robert Delaunay (1885–1941), French painter, co-founder of Orphism with his wife Sonia
- Sonia Delaunay (1885–1979), wife of Robert, born Sarah Stern in Ukraine
- Isaac Dobrinsky
- Jean Dubuffet (1901–1985)
- François Zdenek Eberl, a naturalised French painter, a Catholic born in Prague
- Tsuguharu Foujita, Japanese-French painter
- Boris Borvine Frenkel, Jewish painter from Poland
- Yitzhak Frenkel, father of modern Israeli art, Jewish, Israeli-French artist. Sent his students to learn in Paris. Carried the influence of the School of Paris to pre-independence Israel which up to that point was dominated by Orientalism.
- Leopold Gottlieb (1879–1934), Polish paintier
- Philippe Hosiasson (1898–1978), a Jewish painter born in Odessa, associated with the Ballets Russes
- Max Jacob
- Wassily Kandinsky (1866–1944), Russian abstract artist, arrived in 1933
- Georges Kars, Czech painter
- Moïse Kisling, lived at La Ruche
- Jesekiel David Kirszenbaum, Polish Jewish artist
- Pinchus Kremegne Jewish artist
- Michel Kikoine, Jewish artist, born in Belarus
- Jacques Lipchitz, lived at La Ruche; Jewish cubist sculptor; took refuge from the Germans in the US
- Morice Lipsi, Jewish sculptor of Polish origin
- Jacob Mącznik (1905–1945), born in Poland, arrived in Paris in 1928, died at the hands of the Nazis 1945. A young and highly regarded member of the École de Paris in the 1930s, prior to its decimation by the Reich.
- Louis Marcoussis, had a studio in Montparnasse
- Zygmunt Menkes, a Polish-Jewish painter who later moved to the U.S.
- Adolphe MIlich, born and trained in Poland and Germany, arrived in Paris 1920, had a studio in Montparnasse
- Abraham Mintchine lived in Paris from 1926, then intermittently from 1930 after René Gimpel encouraged him to discover the south of France. Died in 1931
- Yervand Kochar, Armenian sculptor and artist
- Amedeo Modigliani (1884–1920), Jewish Italian artist, arrived in Paris in 1906, lived at La Ruche
- Piet Mondrian (1872–1944), Dutch abstract artist, moved to Paris in 1920
- Elie Nadelman, lived in Paris for ten years
- Amshey Nurenberg (1887–1979), born in Elisavetgrad (Ukraine) in 1887, arrived in Paris in 1910, lived at La Ruche
- Chana Orloff (1888–1968), Jewish Ukrainian portrait sculptor worked in Montparnasse
- Pierre Palué (1920-2005), French painter, recognised as part of the New School of Paris
- Jules Pascin, Bulgarian-born Jew
- Zinaida Serebriakova (1884–1967), Russian painter, arrived in Paris in 1905
- Chaïm Soutine (1893–1943), Jewish artist, born in a shtetl near Minsk, was unable to get a US visa when the German Army invaded, and lived in hiding under the occupation until he died in 1943 at age 50. Soutine, a friend of Modigliani, arrived in Paris in 1913 and lived at La Ruche
- Avigdor Stematsky (1908–1989), Israeli, student of Isaac Frenkel, especially notable in his later abstract and cubist art
- Kostia Terechkovitch was born in Russia and arrived in Paris in 1920, where he was part of the Montparnasse émigré group.
- Maurice Utrillo (1883–1955)
- Aleksander Vardi, Estonian painter, arrived in Paris in 1925
- Kuno Veeber, Estonian artist, arrived in Paris in 1924
- Max Weber, German artist, arrived in Paris in 1905
- Ossip Zadkine, born in Belarus and lived at La Ruche
- Faïbich-Schraga Zarfin, born in Belarus, friend of Soutine
- Princess Fahrelnissa Zeid (1901–1991), Turkish artist
- Alexandre Zinoview born in 1889 in Russia, died in France in 1977. Arrived in Paris in 1908. Volunteered for the French Foreign Legion in World War I, became a naturalised French citizen in 1938

=== Associated with artists ===
- Albert C. Barnes, whose buying trip to Paris gave many School of Paris artists their first break
- Waldemar George, unfriendly art critic
- Peggy Guggenheim, art dealer, art collector
- Paul Guillaume, art dealer introduced to de Chirico by Apollinaire
- Jonas Netter, an art collector
- Madeline and Marcellin Castaing, collectors
- André Warnod, a friendly art critic
- Léopold Zborowski, art dealer, represented Modigliani and Soutine

== Gallery ==
Jean Metzinger, Femme au Chapeau ('Woman with a Hat'), c.1906, oil on canvas, 44.8 x 36.8 cm, Korban Art Foundation

Marc Chagall, Still-life (Nature morte), 1912, oil on canvas, private collection

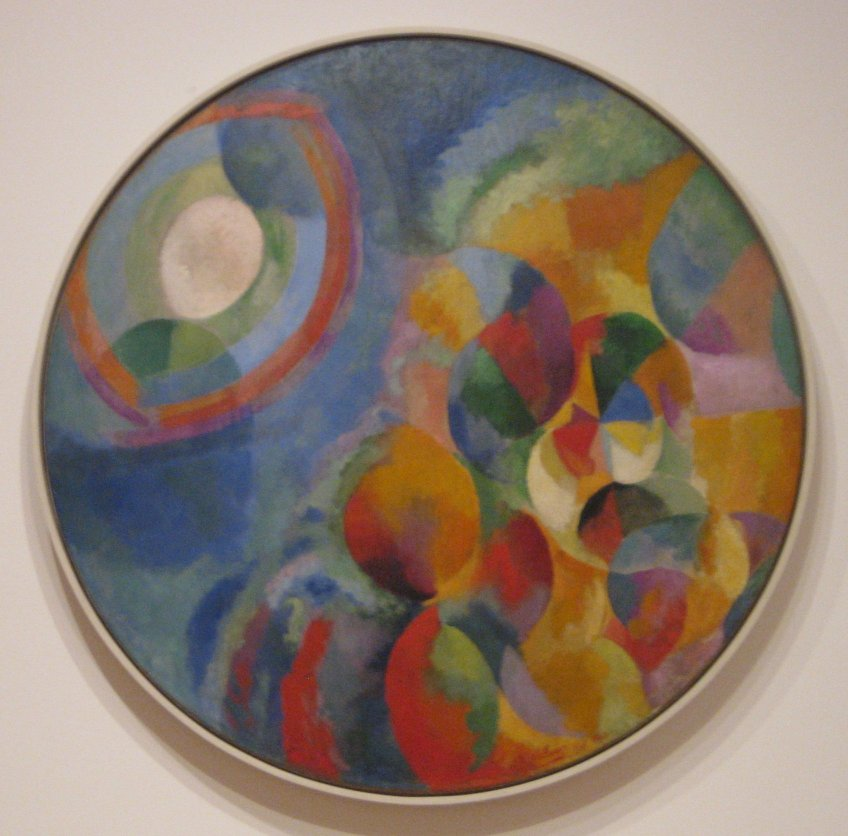
Robert Delaunay, Simultaneous Contrasts: Sun and Moon, 1912–13, oil on canvas, The Museum of Modern Art, New York City

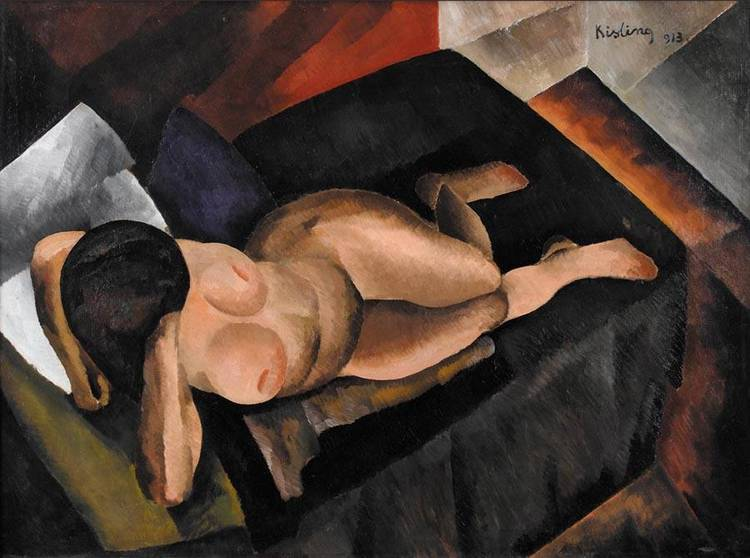
Moïse Kisling, Nu sur un divan noir, 1913, oil on canvas, 97 x 130 cm

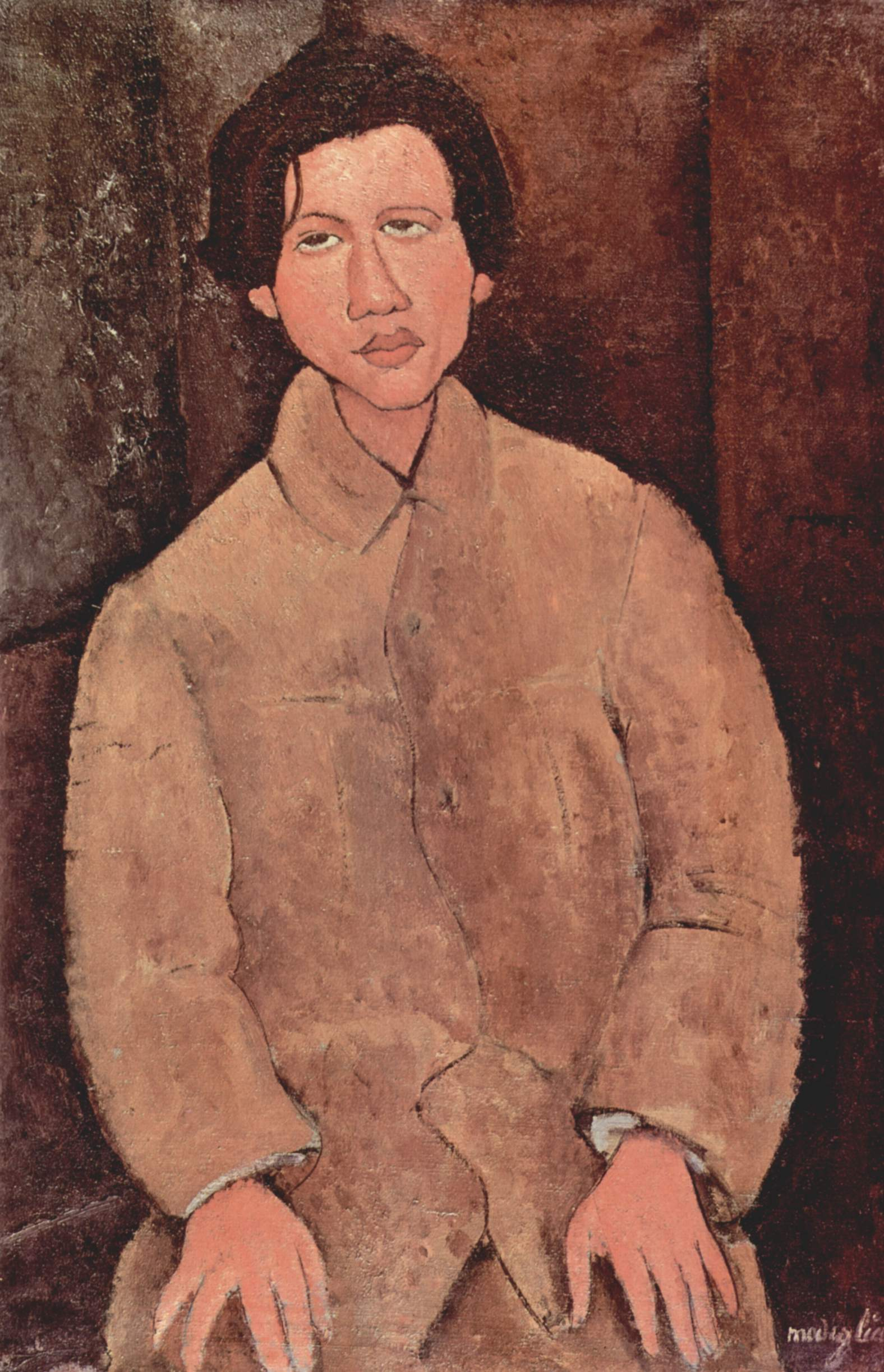
Amedeo Modigliani, Portrait of Chaïm Soutine, 1916

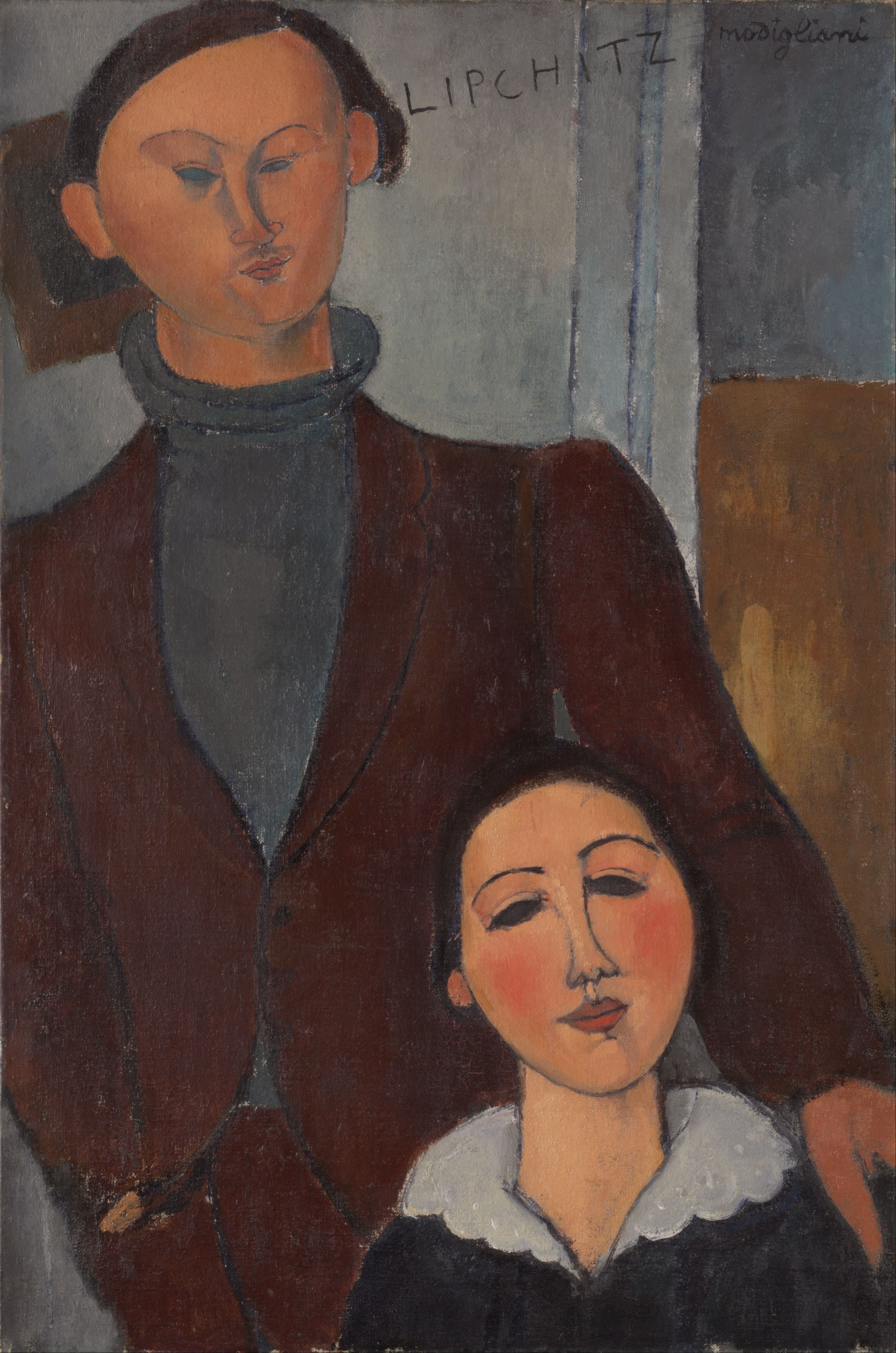
Amedeo Modigliani, Jacques and Berthe Lipchitz, 1916

Jacques Lipchitz, Portrait of Jean Cocteau, 1920

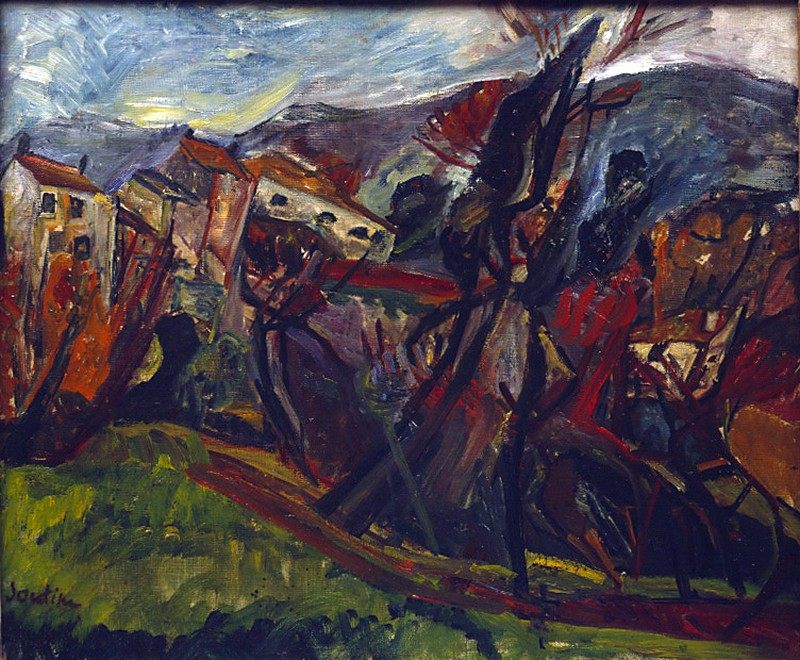
Chaïm Soutine, Céret Landscape, c. 1920, oil on canvas, 55 x 65 cm, Musée d'Art et d'Histoire du Judaïsme

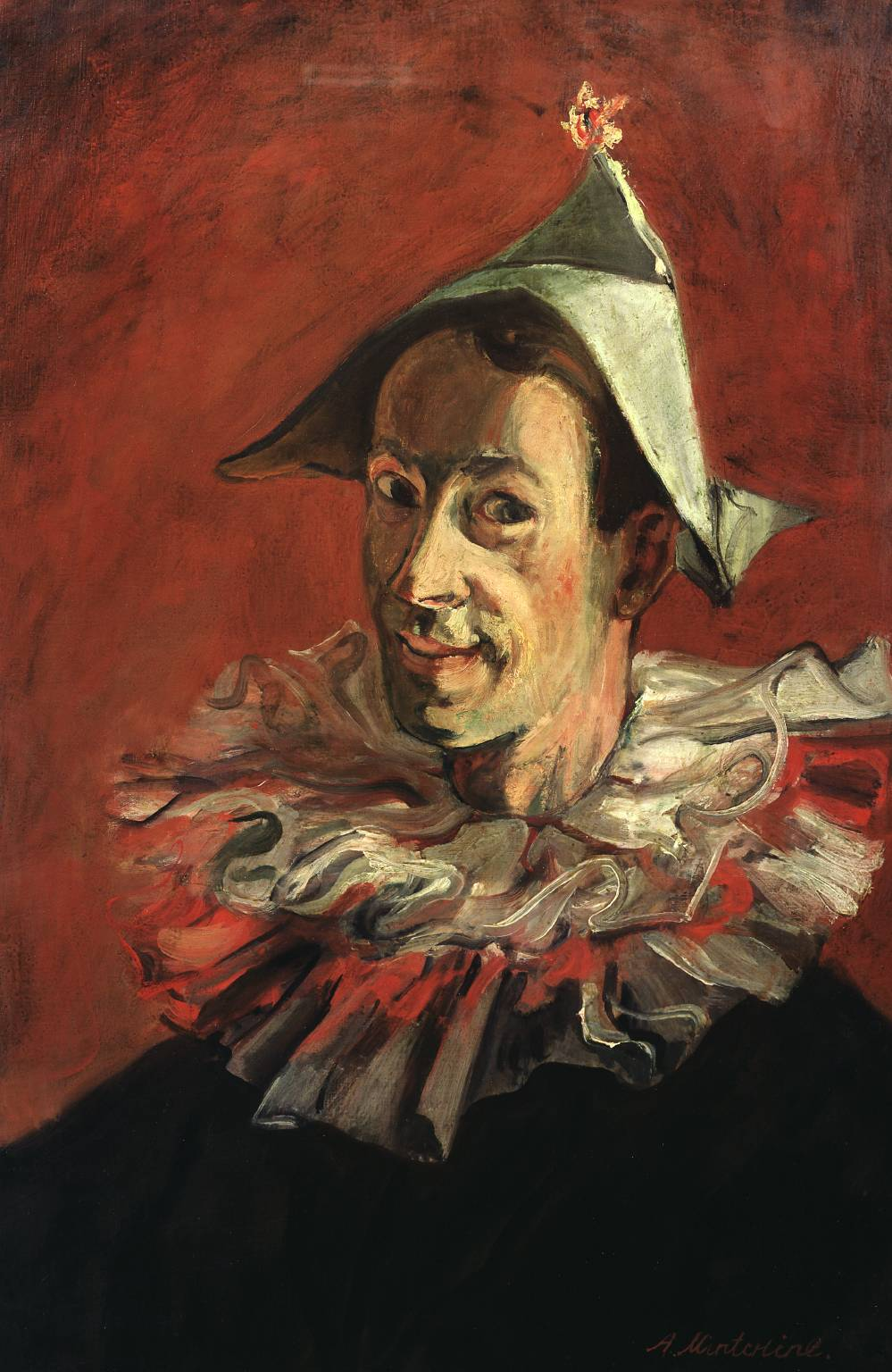
Abraham Mintchine, Portrait of the artist as a Harlequin, oil on canvas, c.1931, 72.5x50cm, Tate

== See also ==
- Informalism
- Art Deco
- Années folles
- Ernest Hemingway
- Marcel Proust
- Gertrude Stein
