= Léon Zack =

French painter

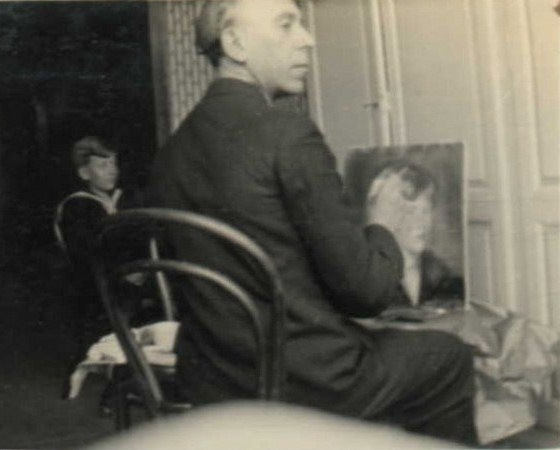
- Born: 12 July [O.S. 30 June] 1892; Rastyapino, Nizhny Novgorod Governorate, Russian Empire
- Died: 30 March 1980 (aged 87); Vanves, France

Lev Vasilyevich Zak, gallicised and primarily known in Western sources as Léon Zack (1892–1980), was a Russian-born French figurative and later abstract painter and sculptor. He has been described as a School of Paris painter. Zack was also a Russian-language Futurist poet using the pseudonyms Khrisanf and M. Rossiyansky.

== Biography ==
Léon Zack was born into a Jewish family in Nizhny Novgorod in Russia on 12 July 1892, to a pharmacist father; by his mother, he was half-brother of the philosopher Semyon Frank. He was an illustrator, painter, designer and sculptor. He has been described a School of Paris painter. He was painting at the age of 13 and exhibiting his work by 15, being a pupil of Jakimchenko from 1905 to 1907. Whilst studying literature at the University of Moscow, he took painting and drawing classes at private academies where he studied under post-Impressionists such as Mashkov.

In 1913, Zack, under the pen names of Khrisanf and Rossiyansky, was briefly active in Russian literature, publishing poems (often subscribed "Paris"), a short story, and articles in three Moscow eclectic futurist almanachs which he also illustrated. His poetry is regarded as an important contribution to Russian futurism. He continued to write although did not publish his later poems until his final book Utro vnutri (Morning inside) appearing in 1970 under the name of Rossiyansky.

After leaving Russia in 1920, he spent time in Florence, Rome and Berlin, before settling in Paris in 1923. Whilst in Berlin, he designed costumes and sets for the Ballets Romantiques Russes.

In 1926, Zack had his first one-man show in Paris, painting figures including harlequins and gypsies. He exhibited at the Salon d'Automne and the Salon des Indépendants and took French citizenship in 1938. He lived at Villefranche-sur-Mer during World War II. By 1947, he was back in Paris designing sets for the Opéra-Comique and in the 1950s he designed stained glass windows, including for Notre Dame des Pauvres at Issy-les-Moulineaux. Around this time Zack's work abandoned figuration for geometrical abstraction, gradually moving toward a more expressive mode of Tachisme. He had exhibitions of such abstract works at the Galerie Kléber in 1955 and 1957. At the end of his life, he lived on the outskirts of Paris and died in Vanves on 30 March 1980.

Zack has work in British national collections, including the Tate Collection, the Ashmolean Museum of Art and Archaeology and the Sainsbury Centre for Visual Arts at the University of East Anglia.

== Selected exhibitions ==
- from 1923: Salon d’Automne, Paris
- 1926: Galerie d’Art Contemporain, Paris
- 1927: Galerie Percier, Paris
- 1928: Art Institute of Chicago, Chicago
- 1935: Galerie Wildenstein, Paris
- 1946: Galerie Katia Granoff, Paris
- 1959: Waddington Galleries, London
- 1976: Léon Zack, Musée d'Art Moderne de la Ville de Paris, Paris
- 1988: Léon Zack retrospective: 1892-1980, Musée des Beaux-Arts d'Orléans, Orléans
- 2009: Musée d'Art et d'Histoire du Judaïsme, Paris
