= André Warnod =

French writer, goguettier, art critic, and illustrator (1885–1960)

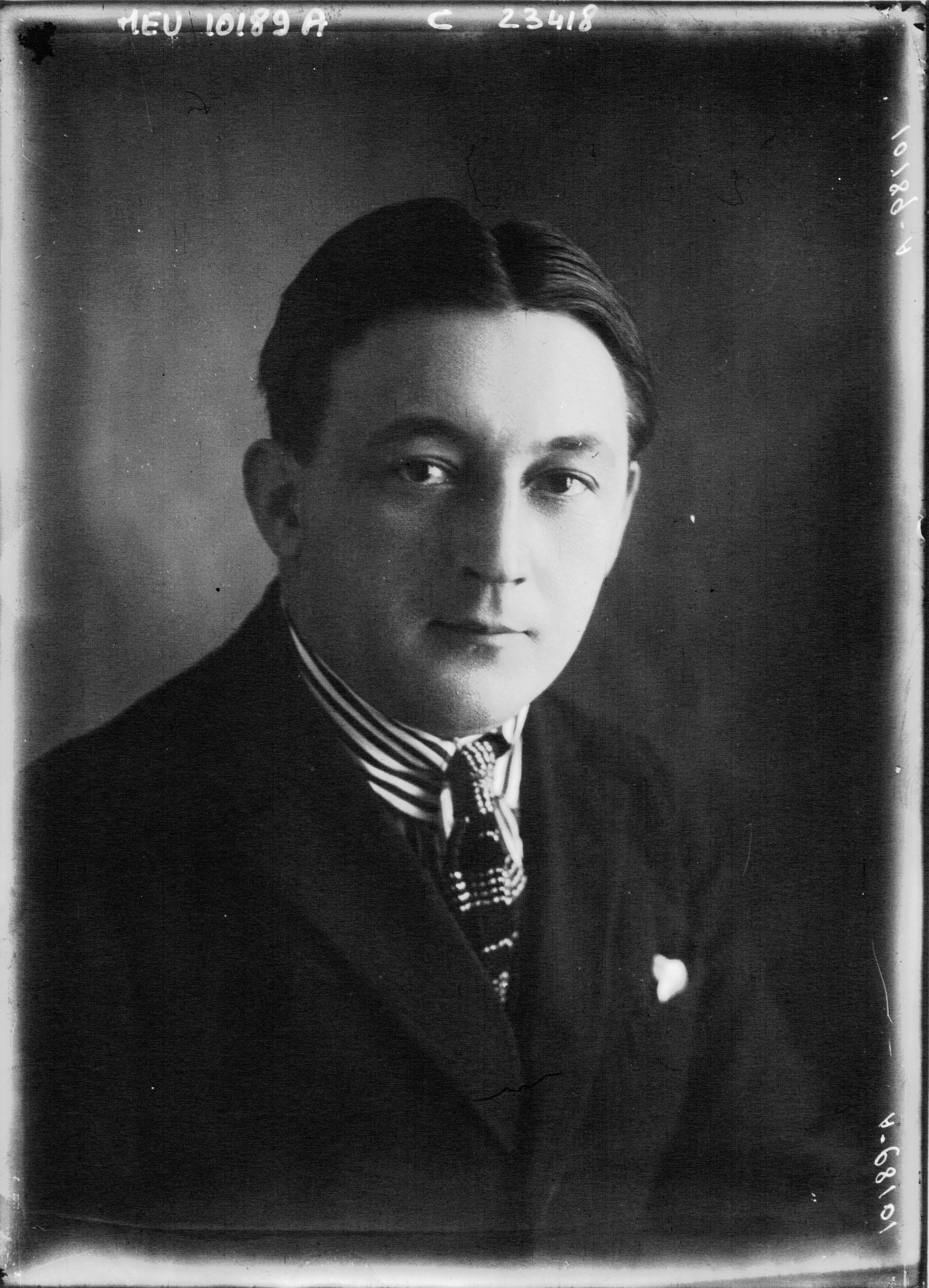
- Born: 24 April 1885
- Died: 10 October 1960 (aged 75)

André Warnod (1885–1960) was a French writer, goguettier, art critic, and illustrator, who witnessed the artistic scenes of Montmartre and Montparnasse during the 1910s-1930s.

== Biography ==
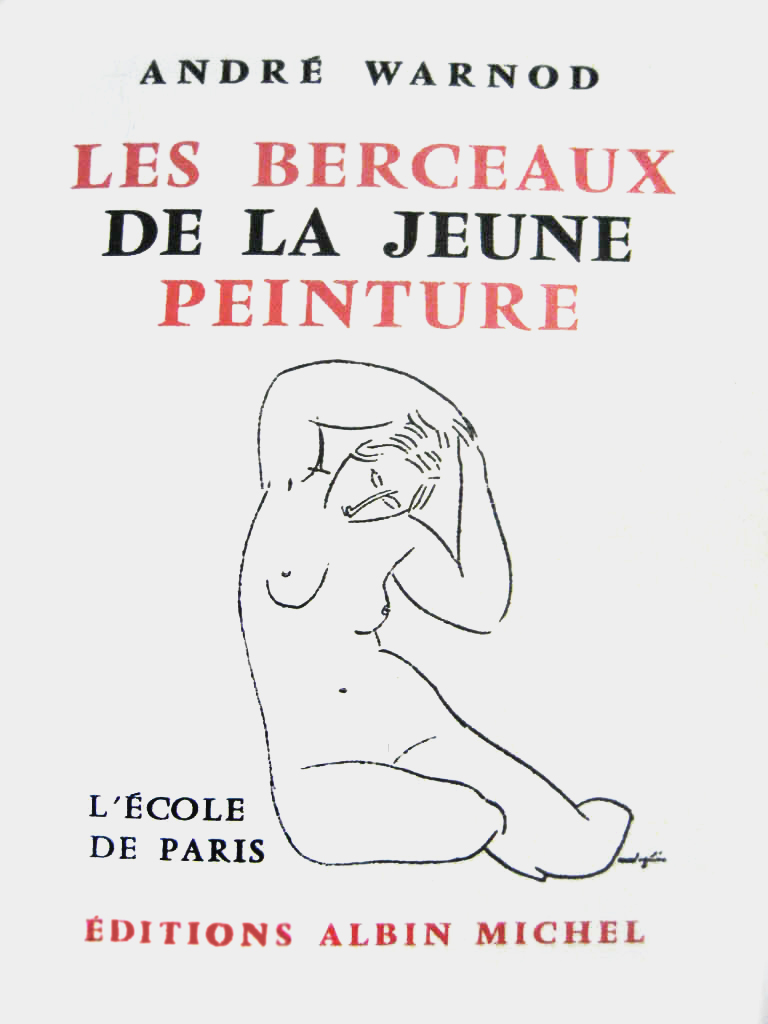
Les berceaux de la jeune peinture by André Warnod (1925), illustrated by Modigliani.

André Warnod was born in Giromagny on April 24, 1885, the son of Édouard Warnod (1856-1893), a Protestant industrialist in Giromagny, and Alice Herr (1862-1953). His grandfather, Édouard Warnod (1828-1890), married to Laure Boigeol (1830-1916), and was also an industrialist and served as the president of the general council of Belfort. André had two brothers: Robert, who died for France in 1916, and Pierre, married to Lucie Mouttet, daughter of Louis Mouttet. He married Andrée Cahen-Berr in Paris-9° on August 25, 1915.

André Warnod was the first to coin the term "École de Paris" (School of Paris) in an article for Comœdia, published on January 27, 1925. He reiterated this term in October of the same year in the introduction to his book "Les berceaux de la jeune peinture" (The Cradles of Young Painting).

He was a member, alongside other well-known or lesser-known personalities, of the goguette du Cornet.

During World War I, he served in the Russian Ambulances, led by Colonel Dimitri d'Osnobichine.,

He was a member of the Mortigny circle, founded by Dimitri d'Osnobichine, in 1908 which brought together numerous artists and regulars of Parisian life: Bernard Boutet de Monvel, Pierre Brissaud, Georges Villa, Guy Arnoux, Joë Hamman, Lucien-Victor Guirand de Scevola, Joseph Pinchon, Paul Poiret, Pierre Troisgros, Jean Routier, Henri Callot, Pierre Falize, Pierre Prunier, a circle that operated until the 1950s.

His signature can be found in the magazines "Paris Sex-Appeal" (1933-?) and "Mon Paris" (1935-?).

Warnod died in Paris on 10 October 1960.

== Principal publications ==
- Le Vieux Montmartre (1913)
- Bals, cafés et cabarets (1913)
- La Brocante et les petits marchés de Paris (1914)
- Prisonnier de guerre, notes et croquis rapportés d'Allemagne (1915)
- Petites images du temps de guerre (1918)
- Lily, modèle, roman (1919)
- Miquette et ses deux compagnons, roman (1920)
- Les Plaisirs de la rue (1920)
- Les Bals de Paris (1922)
- La Belle sauvage, roman (1922)
- Les Berceaux de la jeune peinture : Montmartre, Montparnasse (1925)
- Trois Petites Filles dans la rue (1925)
- Gavarni (1926)
- Roger Reboussin (1926)
- Pépée ou la Demoiselle du Moulin-Rouge (1928)
- Lina de Montparnasse, roman (1928)
- Les Peintres de Montmartre, Gavarni, Toulouse-Lautrec, Utrillo (1928)
- Pour l'amour de Loulette, roman (1929)
- Jean Dorville (1929)
- Visages de Paris (1930)
- L'Ancien théâtre Montparnasse. Notes de petite histoire (1930)
- Le Chèque volé, roman (1934)
- Pensions de famille et autres (1936)
- Cartouche bandit parisien, suivi de Rose Blanchon convulsionnaire, deux enfants de Paris sous Louis XV (1944)
- Allo, allo, ici la mort ! (1945)
- La Vraie Bohème de Henri Murger (1947)
- Ceux de la Butte (1947)
- Pascin (1954)
- Fils de Montmartre, souvenirs (1955)
- Grau-Sala (1958)
- Drôle d'époque, souvenirs (1960)

== Documentation ==
A portion of his archives is deposited at the National Institute of the History of Art.

== Bibliography ==
- Hommage à André Warnod, 1885-1960, exposition, musée d'art moderne de la Ville de Paris, 1985, catalogue préfacé par René Huyghe et Jean Cassou.
- Eric Bungener, Filiations protestantes, Volume I, Tome 3, pages 708-711, Éditions familiales 2001 ISBN 2-9510496-6-8 : sur la famille Warnod.
