= Alexis Arapoff =

American painter

Alexis Paul Arapoff
- Russian: Алексей Алексеевич Арапов
- Born: Alexei Alexeyevich Arapov; December 6, 1904; St. Petersburg, Russian Empire
- Died: September 25, 1948 (aged 43); Henry Heywood Hospital, Gardner, Massachusetts
- Resting place: Holy Cross Cemetery, Malden, Massachusetts
- Education: Saratov Art Institute
- Spouse: Catherine Green
- Children: 3 sons and 3 daughters
- Website: https://www.artfira.com//site/en/artist/9b0ef881875488632ae89eda12a2eb55

Alexis Paul Arapoff (né Alexei Alexeyevich Arapov; Russian: Алексе́й Алексе́евич Ара́пов; 6 December 1904 – 25 September 1948) was a White émigré Russian-born painter, first based in France in 1923, where he belonged to the École de Paris, and later in Boston, Massachusetts, where he relocated in 1930.

== Biography ==
Born into an Orthodox noble family (Arapov) in Saint Peterburg, Russia, Alexis flew to Germany in 1917 to escape the revolution. When he came back to Russia in 1921, he was admitted to the Saratov Art Institute. In 1923, he went to Moscow, where he became a furniture designer in a workers' palace. Following this, he created suits and scenes for the "avant-garde" theater of Russian choreographer Nikolai Foregger. Later he worked for the "False Mirror Theatre" of Nikolai Evreinov, and followed the theater trip to Paris in 1925.

He remained in Paris where he met Catherine Green, an American studying at the Sorbonne. They married and moved to the United States in 1930. Arapoff, a Roman Catholic convert since 1934, painted religious paintings and icons. He became a U.S. citizen in 1937.

In 1948, Arapoff died at the Henry Heywood Hospital in Gardner, Massachusetts, after a car accident in nearby Ashburnham. He was survived by his wife, their three daughters, Anne, Catherine and Mary, and three sons Peter, John and Paul. He was buried at Holy Cross Cemetery in Malden.

== Exhibitions ==
- 1928, Arapoff had exhibitions at Paris's "Salon des Indépendants" and at "Salon des Tuileries"
- 1935, Solo exhibition at the Grace Horne Gallery (Boston)
- 1938, at the New England Conservatory of Music and at "The Arts" (Boston)
- Art Institute of Chicago
- "Religious Works of Alexis Arapoff" Boston Library (Winter, 2002)

== Cross station ==
The Boston Public Library possessed six paintings of a "Cross station". These paintings were considered lost in the 1980s.
