= Emmanuel Mané-Katz =

French Jewish painter

Emmanuel Mané-Katz מאנה כץ
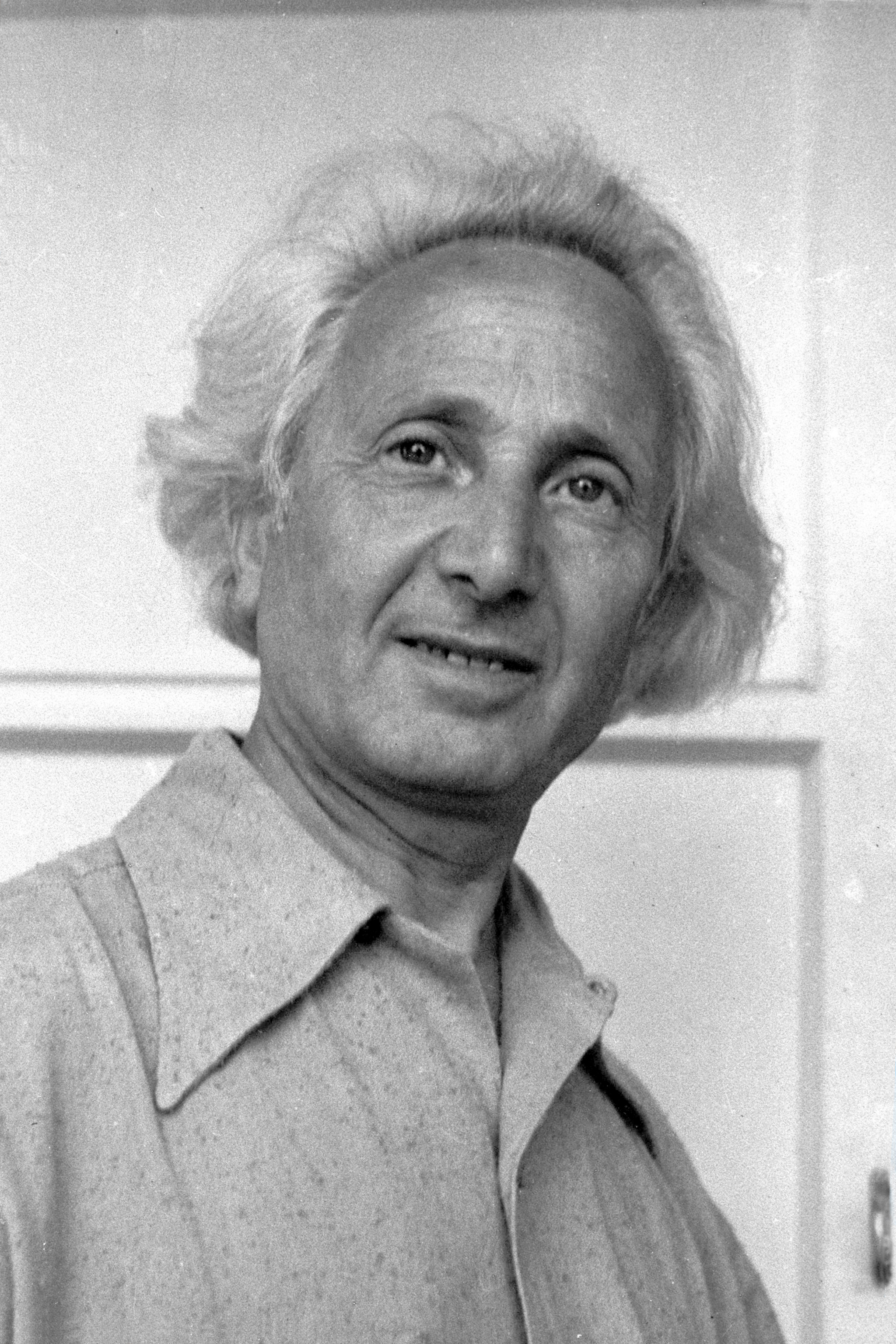
- Born: 1894; Kremenchuk, Russian Empire
- Died: 1962 (aged 67–68); Tel Aviv, Israel
- Known for: Painting, especially of Eastern European Jewish life
- Style: Expressionism
- Movement: École de Paris

Emmanuel Mané-Katz (Hebrew: מאנה כץ), born Mane Leyzerovich Kats (1894–1962), was a Litvak painter of the School of Paris, born in Kremenchuk, Russian Empire (now in Ukraine), best known for his depictions of the Jewish shtetl in Eastern Europe.

== Biography ==
Mané-Katz moved to Paris at the age of 19 to study art, although his father wanted him to be a rabbi. During the First World War he returned to Russia, at first working and exhibiting in Petrograd; following the October Revolution, he traveled back to Kremenchuk, where he taught art. In 1921, due to the ongoing fighting in his hometown during the civil war, he moved once again to Paris. There he became friends with Pablo Picasso and other important artists, and was affiliated with the art movement known as the School of Paris; together with other outstanding Jewish artists of that milieu, that include Chaim Soutine, Isaac Frenkel Frenel, Amadeo Modigliani, Marc Chagall and others; he is sometimes considered to be part of a group referred to specifically as the Jewish School of Paris.

In 1931, Mané-Katz's painting The Wailing Wall was awarded a gold medal at the Paris World's Fair.

The Quartet, oil on canvas by Mané-Katz, 1930s

Early on, his style was classical and somber, but his palette changed in later years to bright, primary colors, with an emphasis on Jewish themes. His oils feature Hassidic characters, rabbis, Jewish musicians, beggars, yeshiva students and scenes from the East European shtetl.

Mané-Katz made his first trip to Mandate Palestine in 1928, and thereafter visited the country annually. He said his actual home was Paris, but his spiritual home was Eretz Yisrael, the Land of Israel.

== Mané-Katz Museum ==
Mané-Katz left his paintings and extensive personal collection of Jewish ritual art to the city of Haifa, Israel. Four years before his death, the mayor of Haifa, Abba Hushi, provided him with a building on Mount Carmel to house his work, which became the Mané-Katz Museum. The exhibit includes Mané-Katz's oils, showing a progressive change in style over the years, a signed portrait of the artist by Picasso dated 1932 and a large collection of Jewish ritual objects.

In 1953, Mané-Katz donated eight of his paintings to the Glitzenstein Museum in Safed, whose artists quarter attracted leading Israeli artists in the 1950s and 1960s, and housed some of the country's most important galleries.

== See also ==
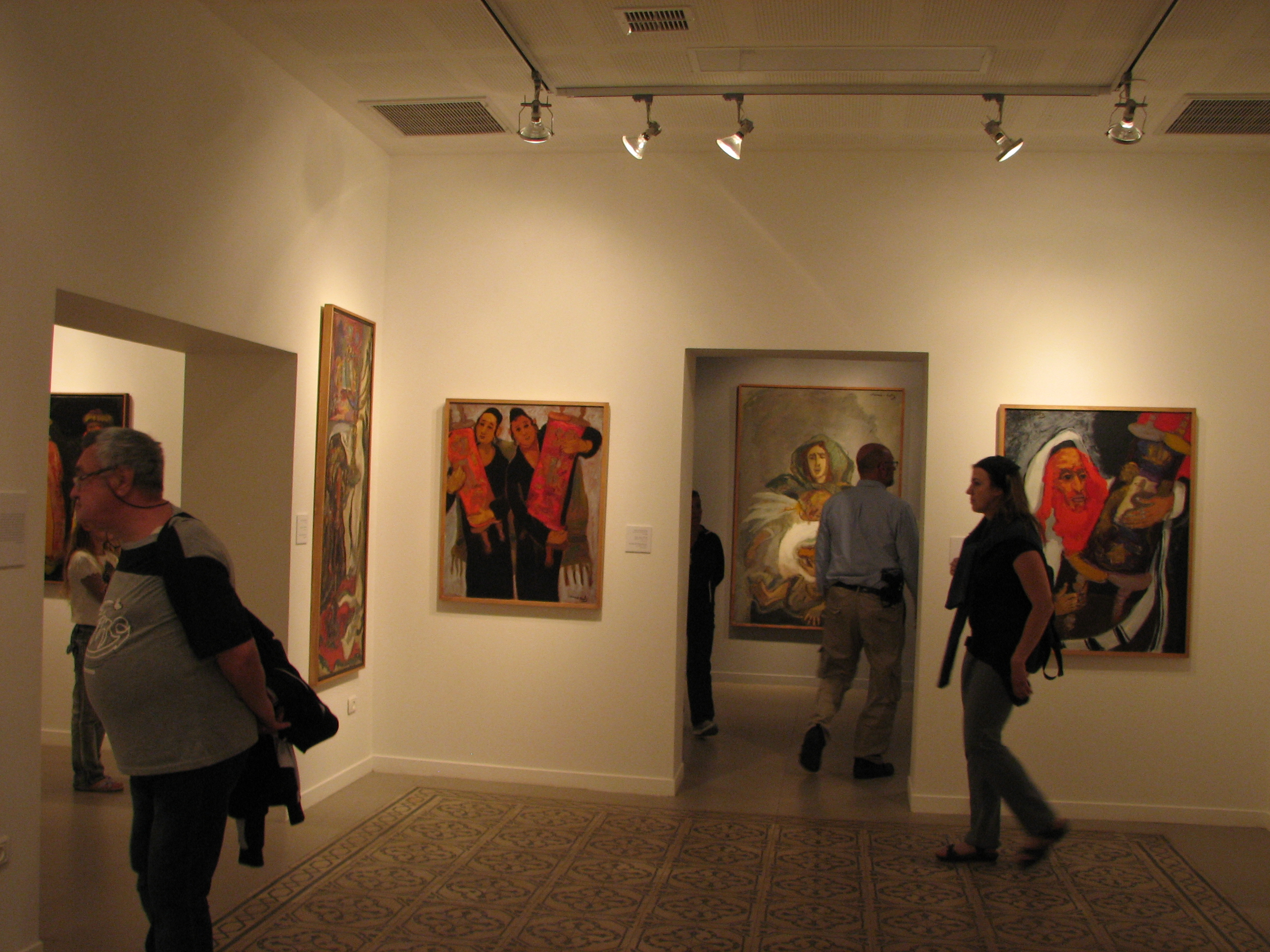
Mane Catz Museum in Haifa, Israel

- Visual arts in Israel
