= Raymond Cogniat =

French art critic

Raymond Cogniat (14 April 1896 – 20 February 1977) was a French art critic, journalist, historian of art and expert on theatre design.

== Life ==
Raymond Cogniat was born on 14 April 1896, the son of a journalist. In 1918 he joined the staff of the Théâtre de l'Atelier. He continued to champion avant-garde theatre as a critic for the journal Comœdia and, until 1940, editor of Beaux Arts. In 1923 Cogniat became the resident art critic of the Revue de l'Amérique latine, developing an expertise .

From 1943 to 1967 Cogniat was Principal Inspector of Fine Arts, and after World War II he was also managing director of the weekly Arts.

Cogniat was responsible for the French pavilion at the Venice Biennale between 1956 and 1960, and called for Paris to host a similar event. This resulted in André Malraux, Minister of Culture, establishing the Biennale de Paris in 1959, with Cogniat appointed as general delegate in charge of the event.

Cogniat was head of the arts section of Le Figaro from 1957 until his death. He died in Paris on 20 February 1977.

== Works ==
- Décors de Théatre, Paris: Editrions des Chroniques du Jour, 1930.
- De la mise en scène: essai d'esthétique du théâtre, Paris, 1947.
- The century of the impressionists, London: Clematis Press, 1960. Translated by Graham Snell from Le siècle des impressionistes, Paris: Flammarion, 1959.
- Raoul Dufy, New York: Crown, 1962. Translated by Thomas L. Callow from the French Raoul Duffy, Paris: Éditions Braun & Cie, 1950.
- Cinquante ans de spectacles de France. Les decorateurs de theatre, Paris: Librarie theatrale, 1955
- Seventeenth-century painting, London: Weidenfeld & Nicolson, 1964. Translated by Frances Partridge.
- XXth century drawings and water-colors, New York: Crown Publishers, 1966. Translated by Anne Ross from the French Dessins et aquarelles du XXe siècle, Paris: Librarie Hachette, 1966.
- Monet and his world, London: Thames & Hudson, 1966. Translated by Wayne Diles from the French.
- Romanticism, London: Heron, 1968. Translated by Joan White from the French Le romantisme, Lausanne: Editions Rencontre, 1966.
- Braque, New York: Crown Publishers, 1970. Translated by Eileen B. Hennessy from the French Braque, Paris: Éditions Braun & Cie, 1970.
- Georges Braque, New York : Harry N. Abrams, 1980. Translated by I. Mark Paris from the French G. Braque, 1976.
- Sisley, New York: Crown Publishers, 1978. Translated by Alice Sachs from the French Sisley, Paris: Flammarion, 1978.
