= Greta Saur =

German painter

Greta Saur (Sauer) (born 20 April 1909 in Bregenz, Austria; died 6 May 2000 in Villejuif (Val-de-Marne), France) was a German painter who lived and worked in Paris. She was an abstract painter, specifically in the style of lyrical abstraction of the "Nouvelle Ecole de Paris".

== Life ==
Greta Sauer (Saur) was born in Bregenz in 1909, daughter of a musician. After attending grammar school in Augsburg, she devoted herself to the study of music, philosophy (with Professor Karl Jaspers) and psychology (with Professor E. Sprenger) in Heidelberg and Berlin from 1929 to 1934. It was then that she made her first autodidactic attempts at drawing.

In 1932–1933 she became involved in the resistance against the Nazi regime, and she was arrested and imprisoned in the Barnimstrasse women's prison in Berlin. For political reasons, she moved to Paris in 1937 with her friend François Willi Wendt. Friendly contacts with Wassily Kandinsky, Fernand Léger, Hans Hartung, Sonia Delaunay, Alberto Giacometti and Serge Poliakoff encouraged her artistic maturation. In 1940 Saur was taken to the Gurs internment camp in France as a "feindlicher Ausländer" (lit. "enemy alien"). She found refuge with Eva Péan-Pages in the Villa Brise des Neiges in La Tronche near Grenoble.

In 1945, after the end of the war, Saur returned to Paris, first finding a studio in Rue Broca, then in Bangeux (Hauts-de-Seine), where she lived and worked.

== Group exhibitions ==
- 1946 and following years, Salon des Réalités Nouvelles
- 1950 with Georges Mathieu, Wols, Nicolas Schöffer, Galerie des Deux Iles, Paris
- 1954 "Collages": Galerie Arnaud (Paris)
- 1955 "Die ausgewanderten Maler - Peintres allemands émigrés en France" (with Jankel Adler, Lou Albert-Lasard, Eduard Bargheer, Max Beckmann, Francis Bott, Heinrich Campendonk, Heinrich Maria Davringhausen, Max Ernst, Otto Freundlich, Johnny Friedlaender, Hans Hartung, Paul Klee, Moissey Kogan, Jeanne Kosnik-Freundlich, Rudolf Levy, Rolf Nesch, Max Pfeiffer-Watenpuhl, Hans Purrmann, Josef Scharl, Kurt Schwitters, Ferdinand Springer, Emma Stern, François Willi Wendt and Wols), Morsbroich Castle Museum (Leverkusen)
- 1959 "Nouvelle Ecole de Paris", Kunsthalle Mannheim
- 1964 "Cinquante ans de collages": Musée d’art et d’industrie de Saint- Etienne (France)
- 1964 International exhibition with collages at the Musée des Arts Décoratifs in Paris
- 1981 Group exhibition with Y. Baume, Bohm, Esther Hess, F. Limerat, Louttre. B, C. Maillard, Robert Saint-Criq, R. Thévenot, Marcel Van Thienen, Galerie Le Temps de voir (Dir. G. Thévenot)
- Participation in several group exhibitions in France, Denmark, Italy, USA, Great Britain ...

== Solo exhibitions ==
- 1948 Galerie du Montparnasse, Paris, France
- 1950 "Gouaches et pastels", Galerie de Beaune, Paris, France
- 1951 "Gouaches" (with Stephen Gilbert), Galerie Arnaud, Paris, France
- 1952 Galerie Arnaud, Paris, France
- 1960 Galerie du Pont Royal (Dir. Irma Hoenigsberg), Paris, France
- 1961 "Peintures", Galerie du Pont Royal, Paris, France
- 1963 "Collages", Galerie du Pont Royal, Paris, France
- 1963 "Peintures et collages" (with François Willi Wendt), Städtisches Museum von Trier
- 1971 "Peintures, collages, objets d’ombre", Centre Culturel Communal de Bagneux, Hauts-de-Seine, France
- 1986 "Collages et objets d’ombre", Galerie Sud - Centre culturel communal de Bagneux, France

== Bibliography ==
- "Dictionnaire de la peinture abstraite" by Michel Seuphor (1957 - Editions Hazan)
- "Peintres d’origine allemande en France : Francis Bott, Leo Breuer, Heinrich Maria Davringhausen/Davring, Max Ernst, Adolf Fleischmann, Albert Flocon, Otto Freundlich, Johnny Friedlaender, Hans Hartung, Jean Leppien, Hans Reichel, Greta Sauer/Saur, Ferdinand Springer, Wols et François Willi Wendt" by Roger Van Gindertael in Allemagne d’aujourd’hui n° 4 et 5 (1957)
- Catalog of the exhibition "Greta Saur - François Willi Wendt", 1963 - Städtisches Museum von Trier
- "Le collage" by Françoise Monnin (1996 - Art du vingtième siècle, Editions Fleurus-Idées)
