= François Willi Wendt =

French painter (1900–1970)

- Born: Willi Wendt; 16 November 1900; Berlin, Germany
- Died: 15 May 2020 (aged 110); Châtillon, Hauts-de-Seine, France
- Known for: Painting
- Movement: Abstract

François Willi Wendt (16 November 1900 – 15 May 1970) was a French non-figurative painter of German origin belonging to the New École de Paris. After self-exile from Germany in 1937, he adopted France as his native country. In France he became "one of the best and most personal painters of his generation, an artist of great purity and strong culture. His self-exactness, lack of pretension and moral sense delayed the fame he deserved". In collective exhibitions he was associated with the most famous painters of the New École de Paris, particularly Roger Bissière, André Lanskoy, Serge Poliakoff, Pierre Soulages, and Nicolas de Staël. He is also associated with many better-known painters today.

== Life ==
Willi Wendt was born on 16 November 1909 into a simple family living in Berlin, Germany. He was awarded a scholarship at the Berlin high school “Zum Grauen Kloster” and carried on his secondary studies until obtaining his Abitur in 1928.

From 1928 to 1934, he studied at university while pursuing art on the side. He sat philosophy (with Karl Jaspers and Martin Heidegger), English and German literature, and history of art at the Universities of Berlin, Heidelberg, and Freiburg im Breisgau. In a parallel direction he started drawing and painting. His first abstract attempts date back to 1931. For some time, he frequented painter Julius Bissier’s studio.

His adhesion to the innovating ideas of abstract art found itself quite naturally associated to the perilous defence of democratic liberties, in particular to the artistic freedom increasingly curtailed by the rising Nazi regime. He was imprisoned by the Gestapo for proximity to Nazi opposition, then saw his friends either imprisoned or sent to the earliest concentration camps. For those reasons, he left the university at the doctorate level in 1934.

In 1936 he was allowed to travel in Italy in order to improve his knowledge of archaeology. However, he also worked with painter Adolf Fleischmann, who was staying there, and Wendt ultimately chose to pursue painting.

In 1937 his opposition to the Hitlerian regime forced him to go into exile. He left Germany for Paris, France, where he arrived in September with his friend, painter Greta Saur/Sauer. For a while he frequented Fernand Léger’s studio and was introduced to Wassily Kandinsky, Robert Delaunay, Otto Freundlich, and Serge Poliakoff. He took part in exhibition groups and, until the declaration of war, he also worked as a scenery painter, a language teacher, and a journalist.

As Europe became embroiled in World War II, Wendt was in and out of incarceration. In 1938, he was interned as “undesirable alien” at the La Santé Prison (Paris). After his release on poet Robert Desnos’s intervention and with additional support from artist Robert Delaunay, he was allowed to stay in Paris with the status of political refugee. From September 1939, he experienced a series of French internment/concentration camps for stateless persons, first at Orléans and Cepoy (near Montargis), then at the Camp des Milles, and then Nîmes. He escaped from the Nimes camp with some friends in the summer of 1940. He then took refuge in Marseille and went underground. Considered as a fugitive from Germany, he was again interned from October 1941 to March 1942 at the work camp of Aubagne, where he was incorporated as a “prestataire” in the 829e GTRE until his dismissal as unfit for health reasons. When German control extended to the south of France at the end of 1942, Wendt took clandestine refuge at Grenoble in the spring of 1943. He was again incarcerated for four weeks in September 1943 in the disciplinary prison of Chapoly in Lyon. Recommended by active members of the French Resistance to Professor Robert Minder of Grenoble University and Andry-Farcy, head curator at the Museum of Grenoble, Wendt's protection was ensured when he obtained fake papers and an assistantship. He lived until the end of the war under the name of “François Aymon” in Grenoble, in nearby La Tronche, and later at Monestier-de-Clermont.

In the La Tronche villa of Brise des Neiges, he reunited with his friend Greta Saur/Sauer, who had found asylum there after her internment in the Gurs internment camp. He also met Charlotte Greiner, a refugee from Alsace.

After the war ended in 1945, Wendt returned to Paris and married Greiner.

Wendt continued his pictural research directed to the pre-war field of abstract art and joined the rapidly reconstituting artistic movement in Paris. He took part in the tradition of the Salon des Surindépendants and participated in the Salon des Réalités Nouvelles from its foundation in 1946. In the latter, he took an active hand in welcoming German painters who, after being stigmatized and even persecuted by the Nazi regime, had continued their creative activity. In 1949, he began a friendship with Roger Van Gindertael, co-founder and former editor of the review Cimaise, editor of the Parisian pages of Beaux Arts (Bruxelles), and art critic of the newspaper Combat. He remained in a precarious condition: limited by his status as a stateless person, having only temporary permissions of stay in France, and experiencing fluctuations in income and resources.

His participation in group and personal group exhibitions finally brought him lightning ascension and the recognition of his peers. Painter Karskaya remembers: “... he was the most authentic, the most true to himself among painters. He did not need to sign his pictures, having one of them before one’s to find them without looking for his signature, in those babylonian salons ...”

He relocated his residence to the Rue Gabriel Péri (G. Péri Street), now kept separate from his nearby studio on the Rue Hoche (Hoche Street), both in the Châtillon area of Paris. At these locations he would pursue the realization of his work. He remained strictly anonymous, with the admiration of some faithful friends and the lifelong support of his wife Charlotte.

In 1968, he finally obtained French nationality. Since his arrival in France, thirty years before, he already belonged to it in his heart. He owned his naturalization to the intervention, support, and testimonies of Robert Minder, Professor at the College de France; Bernard Dorival, Head Curator at the Musée National d'Art Moderne; Roger Van Gindertael, art critic; and painters Olivier Debré, Roger Bissière, and Pierre Soulages.

Wendt suddenly died at his home, on 15 May 1970, at the age of 60.

== Art exhibitions ==
=== Group exhibitions ===
- 1938: “Point 38 by young ones” at the Galerie L’Equipe (Paris, France), dir.: J. Lacasse
- 1943: “3e Salon de printemps at Monte-Carlo, he exhibits under the name of "François Aymon" (organisation: P. André Farcy, keeper of the Grenoble Museum, France)
- 1945 and 1946: Salon des Surindépendants (Paris, France)
- 1946 to 1970: Salon des Réalités Nouvelles (Paris, France)
- 1949: “Les Réalités Nouvelles” at the Chapelle of Ampere Highschool (Lyon, France)
- 1949 and 1950: “Hostudsillingen” at Copenhagen and Arhus (Denmark)
- 1952 and 1953: Salon d’octobre (Paris, France)
- 1954: Invited to the Salon de Mai (Paris, France)
- 1954: “Divergences” at the Galerie Arnaud (Paris, France), organisation: R. Van Gindertael
- 1955: At Studio Paul Fachetti (Paris, France), joint exhibit with Appel, Benrath, Boille, Calcagno, Debré, Downing, Goldfarb, Graziani, Ionesco, Jaffe, Kaiser, Laubies, Levée, Signori, Ting, Tsingos, Van Haardt, and Wendt
- 1955: “Phases of contemporary art” at the Galerie R. Creuze (Paris, France), organisation: E. Jaguer
- 1955: “Emigrated painters” (Ausgewanderten Maler) at the Städtische Museum of Leverkusen, Museum Morsbroich (Germany), with Jankel Adler, Lou Albert-Lasard, Eduard Bargheer, Max Beckmann, Francis Bott, Heinrich Campendonk, Henri Davring, Max Ernst, Otto Freundlich, Johnny Friedlaender, Hans Hartung, Paul Klee, Moise Kogan, Jeanne Kosnik-Freundlich, Rudolph Levy, Rolf Nesch, Max Peiffer Watenphul, Hans Purrmann, Joseph Sharl, Kurt Schwitters, Ferdinand Springer, Emma Stern, François Willi Wendt, and Wols
- 1955: “Six contemporary painters” at the Galerie Craven (Paris, France): Istrati, Sigismond Kolos-Vary, Wilfrid Moser, Louis Nallard, Gérard Vulliamy, and François W. Wendt (organisation: R. Van Gindertael)
- 1956/1957: “Pentagone” at the Galerie Arnaud (Paris, France), with artists selected by Michel Ragon, Pierre Restany, Roger Van Gindertael, Herta Wescher, and Julien Alvard
- 1957: Invited to the Prix Lissone (Italy)
- 1957: “50 years of abstract painting” at the Galerie Greuze (Paris, France) on the occasion of the publication of Dictionary of Abstract Painting by Michel Seuphor (publisher: Fernand Hazan)
- 1958: “École de Paris: Current French Painting (Französische Malerei des Gegenwart)” at the Kunsthalle Mannheim (Mannheim, Germany), organisation: Pr. G. Fuchs and R. Van Gindertael
- 1959 “Neues aus der neuen Malerei” at the Städtisches Museum of Leverkusen, Museum Morsbroich (Germany): group of the Studio Paul Fachetti, organisation: C. Schweicher
- 1960: “Permanence and actuality of painting” with Chafic Abboud, Bissière, Camille Bryen, Youla Chapoval, Oscar Gauthier, Alexandre Istrati, André Lanskoy, Jean Milo, Wifrid Moser, Louis Nallard, Ivan Puni/Jean Pougny, Pierre Soulages, Nicolas de Staël, Gérard Vulliamy, and François W. Wendt at the Galerie Raymonde Cazenave (Paris, France), organisation: R. Van Gindertael
- 1961: ”Artistes du 16ème: Salon des Réalités Nouvelles” at the Drian Gallery (London, Great Britain)
- 1961, 1962, and 1963: “Montrouge Salon”, group “Line 4”, “La Vache noire” (Montrouge, Hauts-de-Seine, France)

=== Personal exhibitions ===
- 1951: Galerie Colette Allendy (Paris, France)
- 1954: Galerie Parnasse (Wuppertal, Germany), dir.: Rolf Jährling
- 1955: Center of French Studies (Düsseldorf, Germany)
- 1955: Galerie L’Entracte (Lausanne, Switzerland), dir.: Ernest Genton
- 1955: Galerie La Citadella (Ascona, Switzerland), dir.: Gisèle Real
- 1959: Galerie Paul Fachetti (Paris, France)
- 1963: with Greta Saur, Städtisches Museum Trier (Trier, Germany), dir.: Curt Schweicher
- 1964: Galerie Dorothea Loehr (Frankfurt-am-Main, Germany)

=== Posthumous exhibitions ===
- 1971: retrospective exhibition of Wendt's work (Châtillon, Hauts-de-Seine, France)
- 1972: retrospective exhibition of Wendt's work at the Foyer International d’Accueil de Paris Jean Monnet (FIAP) (Paris, France)
- 2006: “Réalités Nouvelles 1948-1955” at the Galerie Drouart (Paris, France)

== Analysis of Wendt's work ==
What do we want? The transformation of our experiences into a whirldwind of colours and forms. Our technique? Let us call it another phoenix, ever renewed from past to the present. Our subject? There is only one, the future.

— François Willi Wendt, Album n°1 du Salon des Réalités Nouvelles, 1947

With these brief notes published in 1947 in the first album of the Salon des Réalités Nouvelles, François Willi Wendt foresaw the indomitable dynamism of his evolution. But he did so reservedly: as he defied the systematisation of geometric abstraction, at times he also resisted being tempted by the subjectivity of lyrical abstraction. “For fifteen years (1938–1953), I have been dependent on graphism. From the beginning, I have been seeking the objective. Through this quest, I have discovered structure.” In this structure, Wendt could see the constituting elements of the pictural space, with tension and density as attributes.

In a parallel direction, it had been clearly specified that the new research of the aesthetic activity liberated from the servitudes of figuration, required a deeper coincidence of the substance and form: “We must reach a synthesis where neither colour nor form nor content is absent. Finally I say: content though the basis of the banal, the worldly and the magic vanished.” And he would ponder: “Or shall we be for ever looking for new recipes to divide up plans, break surfaces, or pile on the paint? I wonder. Or is it not rather a question of: If you want to be a painter, paint?”

This last question implied an affirmative answer and a choice. From this very moment, Wendt recognized the primacy of the act of painting, the supremacy of the making over the concept for the accomplishment of being in situation in time and dependent on the constants of the human condition. This is the way we must understand the artist’s thought when jotting down these remarks: “painting is not an end in itself, but a means, like music and poetry; the choice of the pictural means is minor and depends on each one’s inclinations. It may be a matter of expressing, through suitable pictural means, not only our epoch in its most intimate structure, but also in what it overtops. Our blindness, our differences, our bondages infallibly express themselves in our painting. The forces which govern us, interior as well as exterior, may not always be definable. Without exception we are confined in life like all our fellowmen: this is our ivory tower and, perhaps, our only virtue.” And if he had been asked what principal efficiency factor appeared in the art of our time, he would have referred to the notion of intensity. His development really constantly strained towards a greater intensity; the exceptional capacity of animation which he then expresses fully marks his very direct and varied pictural writing. He sometimes reduced the modalities of this pictural writing to a tight texture and a measured structure in order to reconcile it with the spatial unit that seems to have been his ultimate objective.

It is clear that it is through the development of a dense rhythmic structure with a coherence which meets that of substance, that F.W. Wendt has constantly reconciled the living reality of painting with that of nature. Yet, never did he allow his pictural activity to depend on an impulse received from the external world or, at least never consciously. Never, in his picture did he intend to consciously blend painting and natural phenomena or the perception he had of these phenomena. If nature is nevertheless present in his work, or if the spectator looking at his pictures believes he discovers it there, it will be less in so far as they derive from nature, than because a common order determines the physical milieu and the person’s mental space. Thus the temporal unity of the human being with the universe is revealed by the single act of painting. The eye and the mind remain wide open on an immeasurable space, one which is characteristically “his vital space” before becoming, on the canvas, a vibrating natural space for the spectator. F.W. Wendt displayed extreme sensitivity (thanks to the tension of his tight structuration that at times sight makes pictural nearly imponderable) the intensity of his accomplishment and clearness of conscience. Through his work (displayed as such, without other justification than his objective evidence and his admirable intrinsic qualities) F. Wendt has given an account of his presence in the world.

— Roger Van Gindertael, Catalog of the retrospective exhibition, 1971
