= Jean Leppien =

German painter (1910–1991)

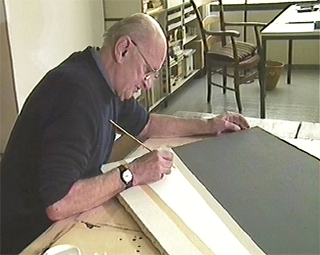
- Jean Leppien in 1987 in his Paris art studio
- Born: Kurt Leppien; April 8, 1910; Lüneburg, Germany
- Died: October 19, 1991 (aged 81); Courbevoie, France

Jean Leppien (born Kurt Leppien; April 8, 1910 – October 19, 1991) was a German-born French painter.

From 1929, Leppien studied at the Bauhaus Dessau with Josef Albers, Wassily Kandinsky and Paul Klee. He moved to France in 1933. In 1944, he was arrested and sent to prisons in Germany. After the war he stayed in France as Jean Leppien, where he exhibited at the Salon des Réalités Nouvelles. He is known for his work in geometric abstraction, and his style has been compared with that of painters such as Alberto Magnelli, Jean Deyrolle, Michel Seuphor, Emile Gilioli and Aurélie Nemours.

== Life ==
Leppien was born in Lüneburg, the son of Jean-Gottfried Leppien, who made horsehair cloth. His mother, Gertrud (née Domnich), came from a Hamburg merchant family. He grew up in Lüneburg and became interested in art at an early age. Encouraged by local painters such as Ehrich Turlach and Otto Brix, he drew and painted regularly while a pupil at the Johanneum, the town's grammar school.

=== Education and apprenticeship ===
From 1929 to 1930, Leppien studied at the Bauhaus Dessau, where he attended the preliminary course of Josef Albers and the painting classes of Wassily Kandinsky and Paul Klee. He left Dessau when Hannes Meyer was dismissed as director in 1930, as he disagreed with the school's new direction. From 1931 to 1933, he studied photography with Lucia Moholy at the Itten School in Berlin, and worked with László Moholy-Nagy on the 1931 Building Exhibition in Berlin.

=== Emigration to France ===
In 1933, Leppien moved to Paris, as did his future wife, Suzanne Markos-Ney, who had also studied at the Bauhaus. He earned a living from commercial graphic design, including book covers, as well as photomontages, exhibition design and photojournalism.

=== War period ===
When the Second World War began in 1939, Leppien, still a German citizen, was interned in a camp at Marolles. He then joined the French Foreign Legion and spent almost a year in Algeria and Morocco.

Fearing the Gestapo, Leppien and Suzanne lived quietly in Sorgues, near Avignon, from 1940 to 1944, growing vegetables on a small plot of land to survive.

In 1944, the Gestapo arrested Suzanne, whom the Nazis classed as "half-Jewish", and deported her to Auschwitz. Leppien was sentenced to death by a German court in Paris for "aiding the enemy" by supplying weapons, but the sentence was later commuted to a long prison term. He was held in prisons in Bruchsal, Ludwigsburg, Ulm and Donauwörth, and was freed by US troops at Kaisheim on April 25, 1945. A month later, on May 25, he was reunited in Paris with Suzanne, who had survived Auschwitz.

=== New beginning after 1945 ===
Leppien's real development as an artist began after the war, although it built on his short time at the Bauhaus. He and Suzanne settled in Nice, and in 1946 he began drawing and painting again, despite having little money or materials. From the 1950s, he divided his life and work between Paris and Roquebrune-Cap-Martin.

Leppien became friends with many artists of the art abstrait movement, including André Bloc, Heinrich Maria Davringhausen, Jean Deyrolle, Adolf Fleischmann, Richard Mortensen, Serge Poliakoff, Hans Reichel, Michel Seuphor, Pierre Soulages, Victor Vasarely, as well as the critic Herta Wescher. He became a member of the Salon des Réalités Nouvelles, where he exhibited regularly from 1946 for the rest of his life.

He took part in several group exhibitions. One, in 1947 at the Galerie Deux Îles in Paris, was organized by the critic Charles Estienne, a supporter of abstract art, and also showed work by Deyrolle, Reichel, Sérusier and Springer.

In 1948, Leppien received an encouragement prize (prix d'encouragement) of the Kandinsky Prize, whose main award went to Max Bill. He was in close contact with Kandinsky's widow, Nina Kandinsky. In 1949, he had his first solo exhibition, at Colette Allendy's gallery in Paris. In 1953, he became a French citizen.

He went on to show his work in many solo and group exhibitions in France and abroad. In 1987, the French Ministry of Culture made him an Officer of the Ordre des Arts et des Lettres.

Leppien died in Courbevoie, near Paris, on October 19, 1991, and was buried in Roquebrune-Cap-Martin. A street in the new Wienebütteler Weg housing area of his hometown, Lüneburg, is named after him.
