= Edgar Stoëbel =

French painter

- Born: René Ichoua Teboul; December 21, 1909; Frenda, Algéria
- Died: December 2001; Paris, France
- Known for: Painting

The French artist Edgar Stoëbel (December 12, 1909 – December 2001), (also known as René Teboul Yechoua), was born in Frenda, Algeria, on 21 December 1909, and died in Paris in December 2001. Stoëbel was the pseudonym he used as a painter.

== Biography ==
Born on 21 December 1909 in Frenda, Algeria, died in December 2001 in Paris, France. From a very young age, he was attracted to music and graphic art, and these two art forms were closely linked throughout his life, giving his art a musical, rhythmic dimension.

In Oran, he founded a small music school with 17 musicians, and conducted an orchestra; but he soon felt that he would not make any progress unless he went to Paris.

In 1931, he arrived in Paris to work on his music and studied with Professor Léon Eugène Moreau, Grand prix de Rome, who taught him harmony, counterpoint, fugue and the piano until the declaration of war in 1939, when he left to rejoin his infantry corps.

In 1940, faced with the rise in Nazism, he returned to Algeria where he painted, drew and conducted an orchestra until 1942. There are collections in Algeria which contain figurative works from this period.

In 1942, the Americans landed in Oran, meaning that Jews no longer had to wear the yellow star there. This was the start of Edgar Stoëbel’s sympathy for the Americans and their wonderful organisational skills.

He became aware that the Americans would have a long-lasting impact on the course of history in the 20th century. Due to the frequent contact he had with them, he ended up joining the Americans and the 7th Algerian Infantry Regiment of the French Expeditionary Corps in the Italy Campaign.

In December 1942, he was very proud to be part of General Clark's 1st Army, which landed in Naples and fought the Italy campaign as far as Rome and Taranto. He landed in Provence on 19 August 1943, at Saint-Tropez and Port-Vendres and took part in military operations until 1945.

He continued to draw scenes of daily life throughout the Italy campaign, and began producing imaginary drawings that prefigured the Figurasyntheses.

After the Armistice, he returned to Paris and founded the Editions Stoëbel publishing house, writing music and songs which he produced in 78 rpm until the arrival of fine groove records.

From 1945-46 onwards, he gradually left behind music to concentrate more on painting and drawing.

Between 1946 and 1950 he painted a number of figurative landscapes of Montmartre, Place Clichy and Place Pigalle.

From 1950 onwards, he frequented the artists’ area of Montparnasse and became friends with the enigmatic artist Anton Prinner, a friend of Veira da Silva, Pierre Loeb and Picasso. This lively band would invade the cafes of Montparnasse until very late at night, the evening often starting in La Coupole, a spot he frequented until the 1970s. He was also friends with the artists in Rue de la Grange-Batelière: Goetz, Mondzain, Michonze, Meyer-Lazar.

In the 1970s, he met an Irish woman in Montparnasse who took him to Pub Olympia, where there was a fantastic atmosphere. He sang his own songs there: "Le beau Paulo", "La fille du marinero", "La Joconde à Paulo", which met with great success. The crowd loved him, and the wonderful contact he made with young people, by singing and drawing on the tables, took him back there every night until dawn. For several years he would return home in the early hours and then get up to draw and paint in the afternoon.

Jacques Martin made a film on the life of Stoëbel, the painter and singer at the Pub Olympia.

Music was a recurring element in his life and influenced his painting, including the rhythm of his work. His canvases often focus on themes of happiness. Edgar Stoëbel is a painter whose work explores balance and life's moments.

In 1960, he invented his own style which he christened “Figurasynthese”. “Figurasynthese is the image one makes of an object, not the object in the form in which it appears to us: it is subjectivised and represents an unreal form in every way. The relationship between the forms is what makes the Figurasynthese.”

Emmanuel David, a major international art dealer, who had also discovered Bernard Buffet, was quoted as saying: “When faced with the artist’s canvas, you are struck by the personality evident in the design and execution of the work. The sincerity of emotion, the height of the tone and colour, the sensitivity and simplicity of the “summarised” composition, create a balance of volume, a poetry, in which dreams and music give this work total originality and quality.”

Stoëbel’s painting in the 1960s was part of the post-war concrete abstract movement, or concrete art, also known as Constructive Art.

Pigeonholed by art critics for too long as something that happened in Paris and especially in New York, concrete abstract art was actually a worldwide movement that spread from South America to Northern Europe, and cannot simply be reduced to the French easel painting of Bazaine, Manessier, Hartung, Estève or Gischia.

This movement, as referred to by Véronique Wiesinger in her introduction to the remarkable Catalogue “Abstract Art in France and Italy 1945-1975, focusing on Jean Leppien” at the Strasbourg Museum from November 1999 to February 2000, is “far from being the phoney echo of the pre-war Ecole de Paris, or a response to American abstract expressionism, abstraction was in fact, until the middle of the 1970s, the last firework of the modern movement, lighting all the fires that still burn today”.

The following non-exhaustive list of painters, important figures in the history of art in this period, shows that the school of concrete abstraction was one of the most important contributors to 20th century Art: Josef Albers, Aagaard Andersen, Jean Arp, Jean-Michel Atlan, Willy Baumeister, André Bloc, André Bruyère, Busse, Marcelle Cahn, Antonio Carderara, Fernando Chevrier, Jean Couy, Heinrich Davring, Sonia Delaunay, Jean Deyrolle, Domela, Piero Dorazio, Adolphe Richard Fleishmann, Nato Frascà, Günter Fruhtrunk, Paolo Ghilardi, Gilioli, Hajdu, Johannes Itten, Joseph Jarema, Lapique, Jean Leppien, Anselmo Legnagni, Henri Lhotellier, Alberto Magnelli, Willy Maywald, François Morellet, Robert Mortensen, Bruno Munari, Aurélie Nemours, Henri Nouveau, Vera Pagava, Penalba, Edgar Pillet, Serge Poliakoff, Hans Reichel, Hans Richter, Michel Seuphor, Atanasio Soldati, Ferdinand Springer, Edgar Stoëbel, Gunta Stölzl, Nicolas Warb.

At the end of the 1940s, Edgar Stoëbel created the first Figurasyntheses, at a time when many artists in the Ecole de Paris were working in abstraction, which saw its peak in the 1950s. Stoëbel did not sacrifice his art for the abstract fashion, but instead developed his own style which saw its peak in the 1960s.

== Museums ==
- Musée du Montparnasse, Paris, France
- Beit Uri and Rami Nechustan Museum, Israel
- Dimona Museum, Israel
- Eilat Museum, Israel

== Bibliography ==
- Edgar Stoebel, Monograph by Lydia Harambourg, Editions du Cercle d'art, ISBN 2-7022-0806-1.
- Benezit, Dictionary of Painters, Sculptors, Artists and Engravers

== Exhibitions and salons ==
- Member of the Association of Jewish Painters, Sculptors and Engravers in France
- Salon des Artistes Français
- Salon d’Automne
- Salon de l’Art Libre
- 1955: Awarded the Deauville Grand Prix International
- 1958: Personal exhibition, Galerie Briard, Marseille
- 1960: Villa Robioni, Promenade des Anglais, Nice
  - Studio sale at Public Auction in Orléans
  - Studio sale at Public Auction in Angers
- 1961: Public Auction organised by The Montpelier Galleries, at Bonham & Sons Ltd, London
  - Public Auction at Philips and Neal & Sons, London
  - XXXVI Salon Berruyer under the Presidency of Mr Lucien Lautrec at the Ecole Nationale des Beaux Arts, Bourges
- 1963: Galerie Bernard Chêne, Paris
  - Galerie Montpensier at the Palais Royal, Paris
  - Galerie Louisa Carrière, Paris
  - Galerie Jory, Faubourg Saint-Honoré, Paris
- 1963: Galerie La Galère, Paris
- 1964: Studio sale at Public Auction in Angers
- 1964: Studio sale at Maître Robert, Drouot
- 1969: Galerie Waldorf, Copenhagen, Denmark
- 1972: Centre Culturel d’Art Juif, Paris [Paris Centre for Jewish Art]
- 1973: Galerie Claude Jory, Faubourg Saint-Honoré, Paris
  - Winner of poster competition organised by WIZO
- 1974: Beit Uri and Rami Nechushtan Museum, Ashdot Ya’Aqov, Israel
  - Hakibutz Hameuhad, Israel
  - P.N Emek Hajarden, Israel
- Dimona Museum, Israel
- Eilat Museum, Israel
- 1982: City of Paris Silver Medal for a Figurasynthese
- 2001/2003: Galerie Le Musée Privé, Paris
- 2006: Montparnasse Museum, Paris
- 2007: various exhibitions in museums and galleries.
