= Othello Radou =

French painter

- Born: 1910; Monte Carlo
- Died: 2006 (aged 95–96); Paris
- Education: Ville de Paris
- Known for: Painting, drawing
- Movement: Abstract art, Geometric, Cubism

Othello Radou (1910–2006) was a French artist of the 20th century.

== Biography ==
=== Childhood ===
Born in Monte Carlo in 1910 to a musically talented family, his father was a French national and a successful violinist. When Othello Radou was 17, his father died after a long illness, and he had to move to Paris to find work. At the same time his childhood love of drawing led him to attend evening classes tutored by the artist Jean Lombard (1895–1983), who encouraged him to work and exhibit with the group of artists known as Vert Bois. From 1943 onwards Othello Radou regularly exhibited at the Salon d'Automne, and the Salon des Indépendants in Paris.

=== From 1940's ===
During World War II, Othello Radou was a member of the Resistance movements with his brother-in-law André Dreyer. Despite the difficulties of this period he persevered with his painting using any material he could find - cardboard, paper, hardboard. From 1946, Othello Radou participated regularly in the group exhibition Salon des Réalités Nouvelles, showing his work with other artists such as Auguste Herbin, Jean Marie Euzet and Henri Valensi. The art critic of Le Soir, Leon Degand wrote of him in March 1947: "With regard to painting, we hasten to draw attention to two revelations: Willy Mucha and Othello Radou. The 'fauvist' expressionism of the first and the integral abstraction of the second, testify to serious qualities of invention. Their styles are not improvised and one discovers the complete presence of the artist. Two names that one likes the opportunity to find at private exhibitions". Othello Radou was also working at this time as a film producer and in 1946 he worked on the film, with the Confédération Générale du Cinema Francais, entitled La Bataille du Rail directed by René Clément. This film won two prizes at the first Cannes Film Festival in 1946.

He continued working in film production until 1963, when he devoted himself entirely to his painting.

=== From 1960s ===
During the 1960s, Othello Radou was commissioned by the French State to execute several murals for various scholastic establishments throughout France. In 1971, Galerie Camille Renault held Othello Radou's first one-man show in Paris. A review of the exhibition published in Carrefour by the art critic Frank Elgar describes the artist: '"quiet, solitary, preoccupied with his work. Radou has established his talent as an excellent talent in his mural paintings": these are the terms which Jean Cassou describes the painter of whose works Camille Renault is currently showing a selection. I would add that Radou is not only an excellent colourist, but also an excellent draughtsman, and he is not limited only to his activities as a mural painter.

Radou is an artist who invents geometric forms which are imprisoned in a network of straight lines, spirals, curves and contre-curves, and which give his paintings a firm structure and dynamic rhythm. In addition he paints with honesty. These recent canvases emphasise with intensity the colours and are more subtle in composition.

When he is compelled to paint on a lesser scale he employs another technique. The architectural style is not suitable, so the execution is made in a freer manner, more instantaneous, more accommodating. In this way, Radou shows the extent of his resources. Sincerity, probity, sanity, these are the eminent qualities of his art, whose boldness does not contain a desire towards excess and to harshness, nor to ever go out of control through negligence or disorder."

Radou continued to exhibit in France, Germany, Lebanon, and Canada. By the end of his career the French State had purchased three paintings for the Musee National d'Art Moderne: one from the 1950s, one from the 1960s and one in 1983. He had also been commissioned for five murals at universities, four from the French State (1966, 1969 (x2), and 1973) and one from Palaiseau (1970). He was awarded the Medal of the City of Paris in 1981. In 1993, Radou's wife died and he ceased painting. He died in Paris in 2006.

== Exhibitions ==
Year	Event/exhibition	Location	Notes	Ref
1943	Groupe du Vert-Bois exhibition		Directed by Jean Lombard	
1943	Salon d'Automne	Paris		
1945	Société des Artistes Indépendants exhibition			
1945	Salon d'Automne	Paris		
1946	Salon d'Automne	Paris		
1946	Société des Artistes Indépendants exhibition			
1946	Salon des Réalités Nouvelles	Paris		
1946	Salon de Mai	Galeries Lafayette, Paris		
1947	Société des Artistes Indépendants exhibition		Commended by Léon Degand	
1947	Salon des Réalités Nouvelles	Paris		
1947	Galerie Denise René, Paris			
1948	Salon des Réalités Nouvelles	Paris		
1949	Salon des Réalités Nouvelles	Paris		
1949	Salon de Mai	Palais de New-York, Paris		
1951	Salon des Réalités Nouvelles	Paris		
1951	Salon de Mai	Palais de New-York, Paris		
1951	"Tendances de la jeune peinture française"	Germany	Canvas hung at the Musée National d'Art Moderne	
Salon des Réalités Nouvelles	Paris			
1955	Salon des Réalités Nouvelles	Paris		
1957	Dictionnaire Seuphor exhibition	Galerie Raymond Greuze, Paris	International exhibition where one work by each artist featured in Michel Seuphor's Dictionary of abstract painters was exhibited	
1961	Groupe du Vert-Bois exhibition			
1963	Salon des Réalités Nouvelles	Paris		
1963	"Esquisse d'un Salon" group exhibition	Galerie Denise René, Paris	Canvas hung at the Musée National d'Art Moderne	
1971	Solo show	Galerie Camille Renault		
1974	4th Salon des Peintres du Spectacle exhibition	Maison de l'ORTF, Paris		
1975	"23 peintres français" exhibition	Beirut, Lebanon		
1975	"Mai à la Défense" exhibition			
1976	5th Salon des Peintres du Spectacle exhibition	Maison de l'ORTF, Paris		
1977	"XIIème Grand Prix International de l'Art Contemporain de Monte-Carlo" exhibition			
1979	"Bilan de l'Art Contemporain" exhibition			
1979	"Sensibilités Plastiques d'Aujourd'hui"	Mairie de Paris		
1980	International Art Exposition	New York Coliseum		
1980	Cercle Municipal des Gobelins et des Beaux Arts exhibition	Paris		
1982	Cercle Municipal des Gobelins et des Beaux Arts exhibition	Paris		
1983	Maison des Artistes exhibition	Paris		
1983	Salon d'Automne	Paris		
1983	Cercle Municipal des Gobelins et des Beaux Arts exhibition	Paris		
2008	"Geometric Abstraction – A Retrospective of Paintings 1944 – 1957"	John Adams Fine Art, London	Held after Radou's death	
2010	"Themes and Melodies: The achievement of la grandeur. Paintings 1960–1980"	John Adams Fine Art, London	Held after Radou's death	
2012	"A selection of works on paper"	John Adams Fine Art, London	Held after Radou's death	

== Works ==
His agent, John Adams in London explained his creative process :

"The evolution of a painting would require Radou to create a great many preparatory sketches encompassing both form and colour. This creative process would involve painstaking and meticulous sequential drawings, watercolours and pastels in order to formulate a finished harmony which would then be fully realised when ultimately transferred to canvas."
