= Jährling =

Jährling (German for "yearling") is a German surname. Outside the German-speaking area, the form Jahrling occurs. Notable people with the surname include:

- Harald Jährling (1954–2023), German rower
- Peter Jahrling, American virologist
- Rob Jahrling (born 1974), East German-born Australian rower, son of Harald Jährling
- Rolf Jährling (1913–1991), German architect, gallery owner and art dealer
