= Carlo Mense =

German painter

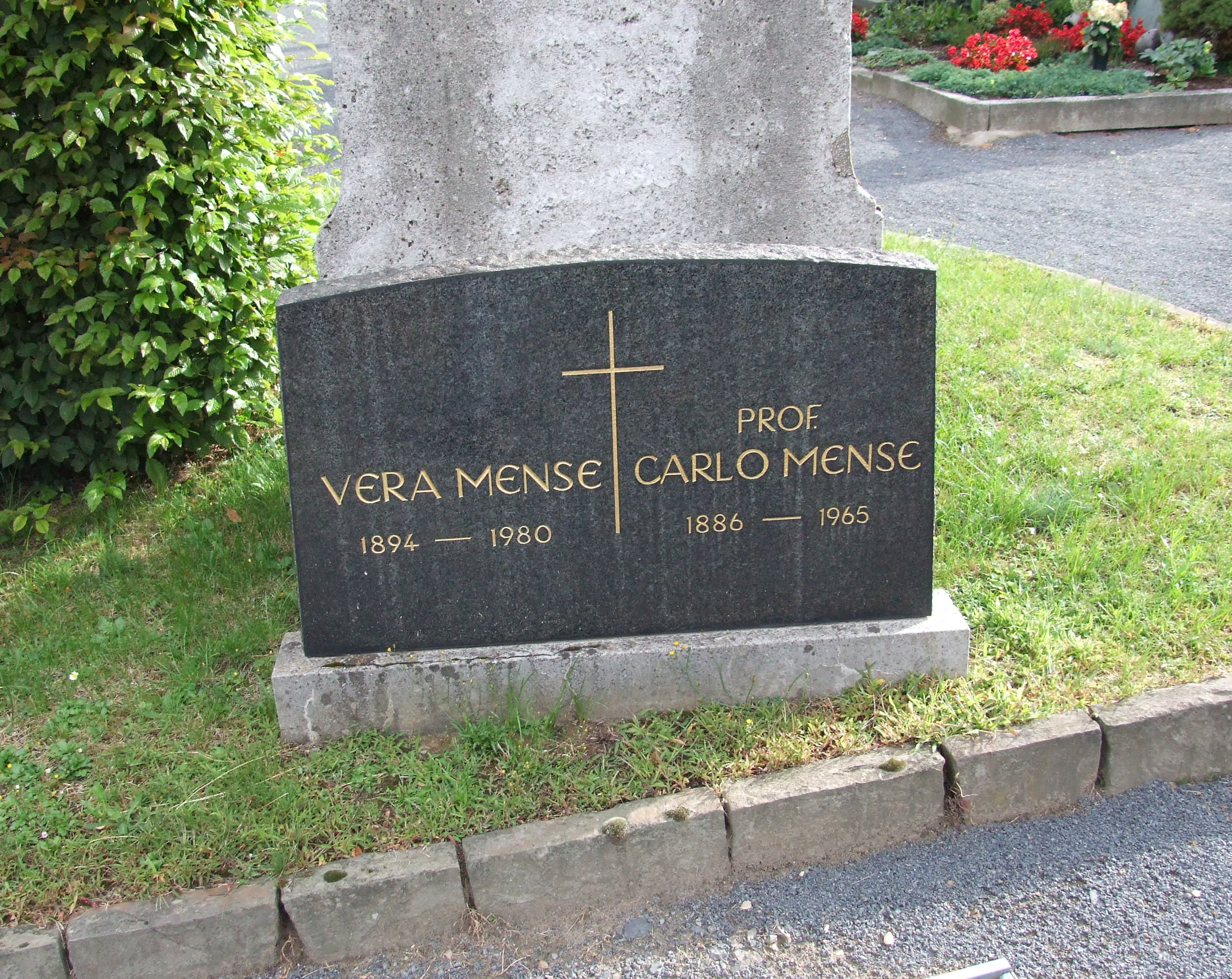
Grave of Carlo Mense in Bad Honnef

Carlo Mense (May 13, 1886 – August 11, 1965) was a German artist, associated at various times with the Düsseldorf school of painting, Rhenish Expressionism and New Objectivity.

Mense was born in Rheine. He studied with Peter Janssen at the Kunstakademie Düsseldorf from 1906 to 1908, and then with Lovis Corinth at the Prussian Academy of Arts in Berlin in 1909. In 1913, he co-organized (with August Macke) the first exhibition of the Rhenish Expressionists in Bonn. In 1914, he spent some time at the artists' colony at Ascona, where he met Georg Schrimpf and Heinrich Maria Davringhausen.

From 1921 to 1925, Mense lived in Munich, where he became associated with the New Objectivity style, in particular being heavily influenced by Schrimpf, as well as by the Italian Valori Plastici group, with whom he exhibited in Florence in 1922. In 1925, he was appointed professor at the Kunstakademie Breslau. Alexander Kanoldt, also associated with New Objectivity, was appointed professor at the same time, and the two attempted to establish a center of New Objectivity there, but came into conflict with the mainly avant garde circle centered on Oskar Moll. Mense remained a professor at Breslau until 1932; soon thereafter, his works were branded degenerate art by the Nazis, and 34 works were seized and destroyed.

He lived from 1945 in Bad Honnef, and died in 1965 in Königswinter. He was awarded the Bundesverdienstkreuz in 1961.
