= Graphism thesis =

Proposition that visual inscriptions are central to scientific practice

In the sociology of science and science and technology studies (STS), the graphism thesis is a proposition advanced by Bruno Latour that visual inscriptions—especially graphs, diagrams, and other visual representations—are central to the practice and authority of science. First articulated in Latour's 1990 essay "Visualization and Cognition: Drawing Things Together", the thesis holds that the power of scientific disciplines is closely linked to their capacity to produce, circulate, and combine visual representations of data. The thesis has been empirically tested by a number of researchers, who have found strong correlations between the level of graph use in scientific publications and the perceived "hardness" of scientific disciplines.

== Background ==
The graphism thesis emerged from Latour's broader theory of inscriptions in scientific practice, developed across several works including Laboratory Life (1979, with Steve Woolgar) and Science in Action (1987). In these works, Latour defined an inscription device as any apparatus or configuration that transforms a material substance into a visual display usable within a scientific text, such as a diagram, chart, photograph, map, equation, or table.

Central to this framework is the concept of immutable mobiles (a key term in actor–network theory)—objects that can be transported across distances while retaining their form, thereby allowing scientific claims to be mobilized and compared in new contexts. Latour argued that much of what gives science its distinctive power lies not in abstract cognitive capacities or special methods of reasoning, but in the concrete practices by which scientists render phenomena into compact, transportable, and combinable visual forms. According to this view, scientific controversies are won by those who can assemble the largest number of well-aligned inscriptions in one place.

The notion of graphism was intended by Latour to underscore the pervasiveness of visual representations throughout scientific practice, from laboratory bench work and instrument readings through to the published figures in journal articles.

== Empirical research ==
=== Graph use and the hierarchy of sciences ===
The graphism thesis has been the subject of several empirical investigations using scientometric methods. In a 1984 survey of 57 scientific journals, William Cleveland found that the proportion of page space devoted to graphs (the "fractional graph area") varied widely across disciplines, ranging from 0% to 31%. Cleveland found that natural sciences journals used substantially more graphs than journals in mathematics or the social sciences, and that social science journals often presented large amounts of observational data without accompanying graphs.

In 2000, Laurence D. Smith and colleagues extended this line of research by directly applying Latour's notion of graphism to the hierarchy of the sciences. Surveying journals in seven major scientific disciplines, they found that the use of graphs correlated "almost perfectly" with the perceived hardness of each discipline (r = 0.97). The same pattern held across ten specialty fields within psychology (r = 0.93), suggesting that the relationship between graph use and scientificity applies not only between major disciplines but also within individual fields.

=== Non-graph visual inscriptions ===
In a 2006 follow-up study, Darin J. Arsenault, Smith, and Edith A. Beauchamp extended the analysis beyond graphs to include non-graph illustrations (NGIs) such as photographs, conceptual diagrams, and other visual displays. Like graphs, non-graph illustrations were used more heavily in the harder sciences. Among NGI types, photographs were used most frequently in biomedical fields, while conceptual diagrams were more common in softer sciences.

A notable finding of this study was that neither the use of tables nor the use of equations was systematically related to disciplinary hardness, suggesting that the scientificity of disciplines may be more closely related to their visuality than to their mathematization. This finding complicates the common assumption that mathematics is the primary marker of "hard" science, and instead points toward visual representation as a more reliable indicator.

=== Additional studies ===
Lisa A. Best, Smith, and D. Alan Stubbs conducted further research on graph use across psychology and other sciences, confirming the general pattern that visual representations serve as important tools for data analysis, interpretation, and communication in scientific disciplines. Roger Krohn also addressed the centrality of graphs in science, arguing that their use in problem-solving analysis can best be understood through an interactionist framework encompassing perception, culture, and social organization.

Research on inscription practices has also been extended to specific disciplines including gerontology, where approximately 11 percent of page space was found to be dedicated to data presentation, with tables occupying more space than graphs.

== Theoretical significance ==
The graphism thesis has implications for several areas within the philosophy of science and epistemology. By drawing attention to the material practices through which scientific knowledge is produced and communicated, it supports the broader STS perspective that science should be understood not primarily through abstract logical principles but through the concrete activities of scientists.

The thesis also relates to discussions of the hard and soft science distinction. Traditional accounts have tended to characterize hard sciences as those that are more mathematical or that achieve greater consensus. The graphism thesis offers an alternative empirical indicator—visual inscription practices—that may capture disciplinary differences more precisely than measures based on mathematization alone.

Furthermore, the concept of inscriptions as immutable mobiles has been applied beyond the natural sciences to fields including accounting, digital humanities, and cartography, where scholars have examined how visual representations function to stabilize and circulate knowledge claims across institutional and geographical distances.

== Criticism and limitations ==
Latour himself acknowledged a tension within the graphism thesis: while he generally stressed the centrality of visual inscriptions such as graphs, he also wrote at times as if equations—a non-visual form of inscription—were the most immutable and mobile of all inscriptions. How well these remarks cohere with the general emphasis on visual graphism has been noted as an unresolved issue in his work.

Critics of Latour's inscription framework more broadly have questioned whether treating scientific instruments solely as "inscription devices" adequately captures the role that instruments play in mediating the relationship between scientists and the phenomena they study. Postphenomenological approaches have argued that Latour's semiotic framing of inscriptions overlooks the way instruments actively structure scientists' perceptual and interpretive engagement with reality.

== See also ==
- Actor–network theory
- Hard and soft science
- Philosophy of science
- Epistemology
- Visual communication
- Scientometrics
- Data visualization
- Graphism
