= Hard and soft science =

Fields of scientific study

Hard science and soft science are colloquial terms used to compare scientific fields on the basis of perceived methodological rigor, exactitude, and objectivity. In general, the formal sciences and natural sciences are considered hard science by their practitioners, whereas the social sciences and other sciences are described by them as soft science.

Precise definitions vary, but features often cited as characteristic of hard science include producing testable predictions, performing controlled experiments, relying on quantifiable data and mathematical models, a high degree of accuracy and objectivity, higher levels of consensus, faster progression of the field, greater explanatory success, cumulativeness, replicability, and generally applying a purer form of the scientific method. A closely related idea (originating in the nineteenth century with Auguste Comte) is that scientific disciplines can be arranged into a hierarchy of hard to soft on the basis of factors such as rigor, "development", and whether they are basic or applied.

Philosophers and historians of science have questioned the relationship between these characteristics and perceived hardness or softness. The more "developed" hard sciences do not necessarily have a greater degree of consensus or selectivity in accepting new results. Commonly cited methodological differences are also not a reliable indicator. For example, social sciences such as psychology and sociology use mathematical models extensively, but are usually considered soft sciences. While scientific controls are cited as a methodological difference between hard and soft sciences, in certain natural sciences, like astronomy and geology, it is impossible to perform controlled experiments to test most hypotheses and observation and natural experiments are primarily used instead. Survey data about the replication crisis among researchers strongly suggests that the failure to reproduce published findings has impacted the natural and applied sciences along with psychology and the social sciences. However, there are some observable differences between hard and soft sciences. For example, hard sciences make more extensive use of graphs, and soft sciences are more prone to a rapid turnover of buzzwords.

The metaphor has been criticised for stigmatizing soft sciences, creating an unwarranted imbalance in the public perception, funding, and recognition of different fields.

== History of the terms ==
The origin of the terms "hard science" and "soft science" is obscure. The earliest attested use of "hard science" is found in an 1858 issue of the Journal of the Society of Arts, but the idea of a hierarchy of the sciences can be found earlier, in the work of the French philosopher Auguste Comte (1798‒1857). He identified astronomy as the most general science, (Note: Comte viewed astronomy as studying the physics of the entire cosmos, calling it "celestial physics". He classified the rest of physics (under the modern definition) as "terrestrial physics", which was therefore less general.) followed by physics, chemistry, biology, then sociology. This view was highly influential, and was intended to classify fields based on their degree of intellectual development and the complexity of their subject matter.

The modern distinction between hard and soft science is often attributed to a 1964 article published in Science by John R. Platt. He explored why he considered some scientific fields to be more productive than others, though he did not actually use the terms themselves. In 1967, sociologist of science Norman W. Storer specifically distinguished between the natural sciences as hard and the social sciences as soft. He defined hardness in terms of the degree to which a field uses mathematics and described a trend of scientific fields increasing in hardness over time, identifying features of increased hardness as including better integration and organization of knowledge, an improved ability to detect errors, and an increase in the difficulty of learning the subject.

== Empirical support ==
In the 1970s sociologist Stephen Cole conducted a number of empirical studies attempting to find evidence for a hierarchy of scientific disciplines, and was unable to find significant differences in terms of core of knowledge, degree of codification, or research material. Differences that he did find evidence for included a tendency for textbooks in soft sciences to rely on more recent work, while the material in textbooks from the hard sciences was more consistent over time. After he published in 1983, it has been suggested that Cole might have missed some relationships in the data because he studied individual measurements, without accounting for the way multiple measurements could trend in the same direction, and because not all the criteria that could indicate a discipline's scientific status were analysed.

In 1984, Cleveland performed a survey of 57 journals and found that natural science journals used many more graphs than journals in mathematics or social science, and that social science journals often presented large amounts of observational data in the absence of graphs. The amount of page area used for graphs ranged from 0% to 31%, and the variation was primarily due to the number of graphs included rather than their sizes. Further analyses by Smith in 2000, based on samples of graphs from journals in seven major scientific disciplines, found that the amount of graph usage correlated "almost perfectly" with hardness (r=0.97). They also suggested that the hierarchy applies to individual fields, and demonstrated the same result using ten subfields of psychology (r=0.93).

In a 2010 article, Fanelli proposed that we expect more positive outcomes in "softer" sciences because there are fewer constraints on researcher bias. They found that among research papers that tested a hypothesis, the frequency of positive results was predicted by the perceived hardness of the field. For example, the social sciences as a whole had a 2.3-fold increased odds of positive results compared to the physical sciences, with the biological sciences in between. They added that this supported the idea that the social sciences and natural sciences differ only in degree, as long as the social sciences follow the scientific approach.

In 2013, Fanelli tested whether the ability of researchers in a field to "achieve consensus and accumulate knowledge" increases with the hardness of the science, and sampled 29,000 papers from 12 disciplines using measurements that indicate the degree of scholarly consensus. Out of the three possibilities (hierarchy, hard/soft distinction, or no ordering), the results supported a hierarchy, with physical sciences performing the best followed by biological sciences and then social sciences. The results also held within disciplines, as well as when mathematics and the humanities were included.

The perception of hard vs soft science is influenced by gender bias with a higher proportion of women in a given field leading to a "soft" perception even within STEM fields. This perception of softness is accompanied by a devaluation of the field's worth.

== Criticism ==
Critics of the concept argue that soft sciences are implicitly considered to be less "legitimate" scientific fields, or simply not scientific at all. An editorial in Nature stated that social science findings are more likely to intersect with everyday experience and may be dismissed as "obvious or insignificant" as a result. Being labelled a soft science can affect the perceived value of a discipline to society and the amount of funding available to it. In the 1980s, mathematician Serge Lang successfully blocked influential political scientist Samuel P. Huntington's admission to the US National Academy of Sciences, describing Huntington's use of mathematics to quantify the relationship between factors such as "social frustration" (Lang asked Huntington if he possessed a "social-frustration meter") as "pseudoscience". During the late 2000s recessions, social science was disproportionately targeted for funding cuts compared to mathematics and natural science. Proposals were made for the United States' National Science Foundation to cease funding disciplines such as political science altogether. Both of these incidents prompted critical discussion of the distinction between hard and soft sciences.

== In fiction ==
Science fiction is commonly divided into two subgenres: "hard science fiction", which is sometimes conceived of as dealing with the hard sciences, and "soft science fiction", which is sometimes conceived of as dealing with the soft sciences.

== See also ==
- Academic field
- Demarcation problem
- Exact sciences
- Hard and soft science fiction
- History of science
- Methodological dualism
- Non-science
- Philosophy of social science
- Positivism dispute
- STEM fields
