= Rolf Jährling =

German architect

- Born: October 27, 1913; Hamburg
- Died: July 5, 1991 (aged 77); Weidingen

Rudolf Wolfgang Jährling (October 27, 1913 – July 5, 1991) was a German architect, gallery owner and one of the first patrons of the Rhenish avant-garde. In 1949, he founded Galerie Parnass in Wuppertal, which, together with Galerie Schmela and Galerie 22 in Düsseldorf and Galerie Der Spiegel in Cologne, was one of the most daring galleries in post-war Germany and was closely associated with the Art Informel movement in its early days.

Galerie Parnass at Moltkestraße 67 in Wuppertal-Elberfeld, where the gallery was located from 1961 to 1965, was the venue for the first Happening and Fluxus events on German soil. It wrote international art history with its spectacular media art events and exhibitions in the early 1960s. In Nam June Paik's solo exhibition Exposition of Music - Electronic Television, the first video objects were shown in 1963, and at the 24-hour Happening of 1965, the performances of the Paik muse and Fluxus cellist Charlotte Moorman, dressed only in a transparent cellophane film, caused a sensation.

== Life and work ==
=== From architect to gallery owner ===
Rudolf Jährling was born in Hamburg, the son of the teacher Bruno Ferdinand Jährling. He already admired Walter Gropius and Le Corbusier during his school days. After attending secondary school in Hamburg, he graduated from the Dürer School in Dresden in 1933. From 1933 to 1935, Jährling studied architecture at the Technische Hochschule (TH) in Dresden, from 1935 to 1936 at the TH in Stuttgart and from 1936 to 1939 with Heinrich Tessenow, a teacher of Albert Speer, at the Technische Hochschule Berlin, where he graduated as an Diplom-Ingenieur. In 1937, he first visited the World Exhibition in Paris, where he saw a Pablo Picasso painting for the first time - the Guernica painted for the Spanish pavilion - as well as works by Joan Miró. The visit to the National Socialist Entartete Kunst propaganda exhibition in Munich in the same year brought him into contact with Modern Art even before the outbreak of World War II. In 1939, he worked as an architect in Berlin on the construction of the Reichsautobahn, was called up to the army in 1941 as a Pioneer and was deployed in Russia and southern France. In 1944 he fell into American prisoner of war, from which he was released in 1946.

=== Parnass Gallery 1949-1965 ===
After his release from captivity as a prisoner of war, Rolf Jährling moved to Wuppertal in September 1946 and settled there as an architect. He owed his interest in modern art to the architect Heinz Rasch, born in Berlin in 1902, a colleague of Kurt Herberts, who had set up the "Studio for New Art" at Döppersberg 24 in 1945, where around 120 solo exhibitions of living artists and architects were shown until 1953. Jährling spent the first post-war Christmas with the architect and painter Franz Krause in a furnished room of a three-storey house. A friend, who was an attaché at the embassy in Athens, christened his room "Parnassus three stories high", thus giving birth to the name of his gallery, which also has a reference to the Montparnasse in Paris.

In January 1949, Jährling founded the Galerie Parnass in his architectural office In der Aue 30 a under the roof of a half-destroyed warehouse, whose spectrum ranged from architecture, plastics, stage art, photography to lectures, discussions, happenings and music performances. and supported artists such as Helen Ashbee, Elfriede Luthe, Paula Modersohn-Becker, Claire Falkenstein, Lil Picard and Nele. In 1950, the gallery moved to the commercial building built by Rolf Jährling at Alten Freiheit 16-18. Probably the first penthouse in Germany offered a light-flooded exhibition and work room on the top floor, a promenade-like roof terrace and a built-in studio stage for various productions. In April 1950, Jean-Paul Sartre's Huit Clos (Closed Society) was staged here under the direction of Paul Pörtner and in February 1952 Jean Cocteau's La voix humaine (Beloved Voice). In 1954, Jährling met his future wife Anneliese (née Schu, 1923-2010), a dentist with a doctorate who came to his gallery as a visitor, at Alte Freiheit. In 1958, he opened gallery space at Gathe 83, moved the gallery to Morianstraße 14 in 1959 and, when the collector Klaus Gebhard moved from Wuppertal to Munich in 1961, took over his villa at Moltkestraße 67, where he continued to run his gallery until 1965.

==== First exhibitions 1949-1956 ====
At the first exhibitions, Rudolf Jährling exhibited works by Classical Modernism artists, including August Macke, Ernst Ludwig Kirchner, Gerhard Marcks, Oskar Schlemmer, Jean Cocteau, Paul Klee, Max Beckmann, Otto Dix and Lovis Corinth, followed by sculptors and painters of his generation, initially as part of salon exhibitions. The exhibition program showed abstract art, especially Tachisme, the French École de Paris and the German Informel. Important representatives such as Francis Bott, Peter Brüning, Rolf Cavael, Karl Fred Dahmen, Albert Fürst, Hans Hartung, Gerhard Hoehme, Heinz Kreutz, André Lanskoy, Bernard Schultze, Emil Schumacher, Jaroslaw Serpan, Heinz Trökes, François Willi Wendt and WOLS as well as the sculptor Norbert Kricke exhibited at Galerie Parnass from 1951. The exhibitions were always opened by renowned art critics and theorists, including Pierre Restany, Franz Roh, Albert Schulze-Vellinghausen, John Anthony Thwaites, Eduard Trier and the Düsseldorf gallery owner Jean-Pierre Wilhelm. In 1951, the first Le Corbusier exhibition in Germany took place in the Galerie Parnass and the following year Jährling dedicated an architecture exhibition to the architect Ludwig Mies van der Rohe.

In 1952, Jährling traveled to Paris to meet the art dealer Aimé Maeght, whose gallery represented the artist Alexander Calder, and to inform him of his plans for an exhibition of works by Calder, whose "Mobiles" he had come across in an old Life-Magazin during his time as a prisoner of war. Maeght, not at all enthusiastic, asked the Wuppertal gallery owner, whom he did not know, how much money he wanted to deposit for the exhibition, whereupon Jährling told him that he had no money available, to which Maeght replied that nothing would come of it. Calder, who heard about this, made a huge noise and made sure that Jährling received 16 "Mobiles" from Paris, as a result of which Rolf Jährling was able to open Alexander Calder's first solo exhibition in Germany on June 5, 1952 in the Galerie Parnass. (Note: Alexander Calder: Blick in die Mobile-Ausstellung 1952 (Memento from October 29, 2013 in the Internet Archive), June 1952) A year later, they met in person at the Darmstadt Talks, and Calder asked him to come to Roxbury in the USA, where Calder lived with his family. The three-month travel program was put together by Calder, which Jährling used, among other things, to view American architecture.

With the help of Wilhelm, who ran Gallery 22, the exhibition Poème Objet took place in 1956. It included works by around fifty artists from Germany and France. This exhibition at Galerie Parnass became the first bridge between the abstract and surrealist roots underlying informal art, from artists such as Hans Arp, Max Ernst and Raoul Ubac to the contemporary avant-garde such as Peter Brüning, Albert Fürst, Winfred Gaul, Karl Otto Götz and Gerhard Hoehme.

==== Small summer party - Après John Cage 1962 ====
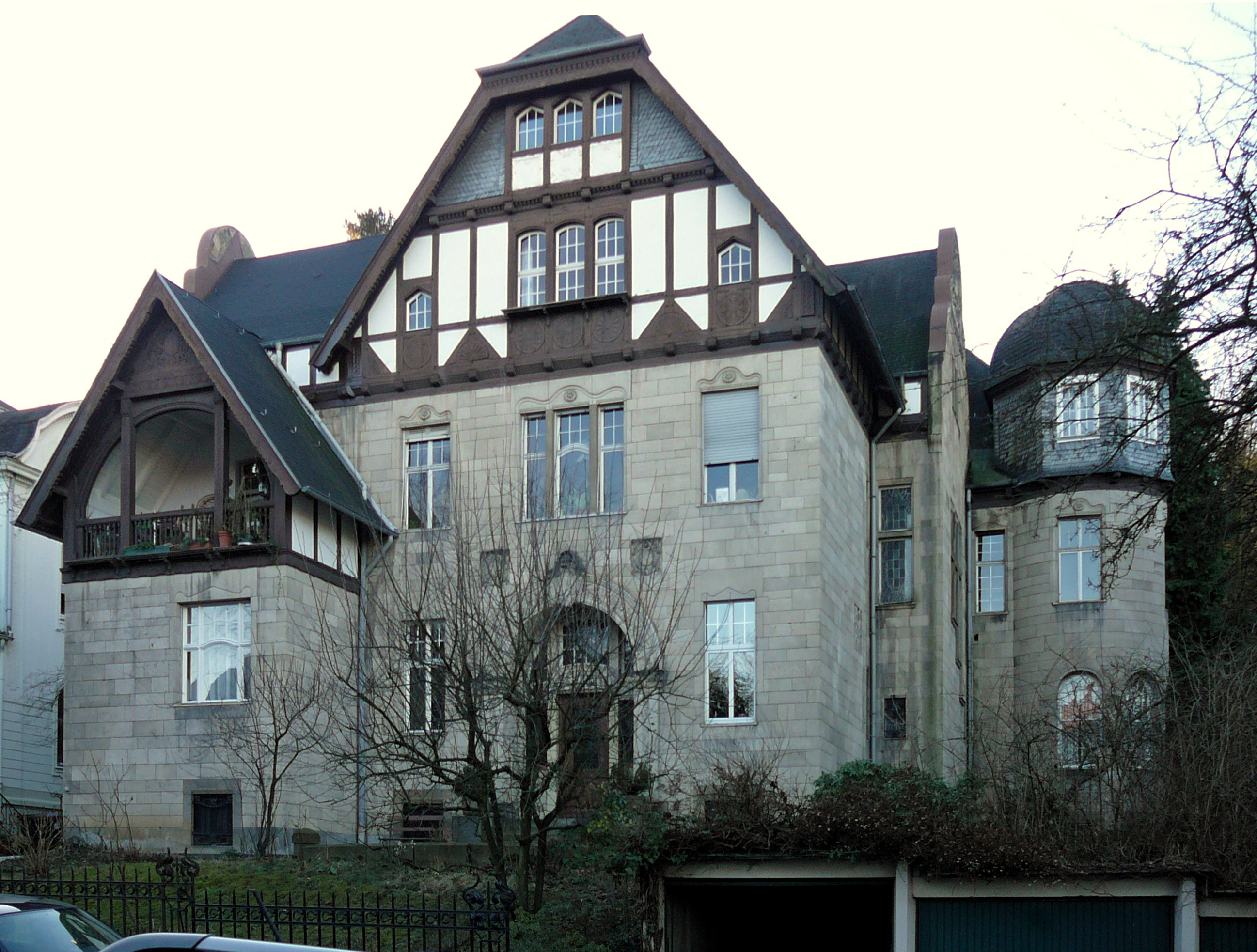
Moltkestraße 67 in Wuppertal-Elberfeld (2008)

The stately Art Nouveau villa of the collector Klaus Gebhard at Moltkestraße 67 in Wuppertal-Elberfeld, which Rolf and Anneliese Jährling moved into in December 1961, offered space for the architectural office, the gallery and a private apartment. The landlord was the then Lord Mayor Heinz Frowein, who lived in the house next door. With its spacious rooms from the cellar to the attic, the villa was the venue for the first pre-Fluxus events in Germany. On the occasion of the opening of an exhibition of various sculptors and painters, the Small Summer Festival - Après John Cage was opened on June 9, 1962, which became the beginning of further Fluxus actions in the Galerie Parnass.

The idea for this summer party came from Jean Pierre Wilhelm of the Düsseldorf Gallery 22 and Nam June Paik, whom Jährling had met a year earlier at Mary Bauermeister and Karlheinz Stockhausen in Cologne, where Paik had worked on the music theater Originals by Stockhausen. Around 100 guests took part. Concert pieces by George Maciunas and Benjamin Patterson were performed, with Carlheinz Caspari, Jed Curtis, George Maciunas, Nam June Paik and Benjamin Patterson appearing as actors. A music stand, paper tubes, children's flutes and a double bass were set up on the steps of the villa's entrance hall. Patterson played the piece "Variations for double bass", for example, by - according to a newspaper reporter present in 1962 - "bowing with one bow, bowing with two bows, pulling a tow rope under the strings, making noises with knife and fork, with hammer and tin foil, sometimes turning the instrument upside down, sometimes lying on the floor next to the instrument", whereby Caspari, director at the Theater am Dom, read out the text Neo-Dada in the United States by Maciunas, which is regarded as the preliminary manifesto of Fluxus. Among the Fluxus events, this concert occupies a key position, as it was the first public appearance of the American Fluxus founder George Maciunas in Germany.

==== Music Exhibition - Electronic Television 1963 ====
In March 1963, a second solo exhibition took place at Galerie Parnass, which Jährling had offered to the South Korean artist Nam June Paik. Paik took a whole year to carefully prepare two pianos for the exhibition. The exhibition, his first of his own, was entitled Exposition of Music - Electronic Television. In the entrance door of the villa hung a chopped-off ox's head suspended on cords, which had been delivered fresh from the slaughterhouse that morning and, according to Paik, was part of a shamanistic ritual. ritual that visitors to the exhibition had to go through. In the entrance hall stood four pianos prepared with various utensils and barbed wire, one of which - an Ibach piano - completely unexpectedly and surprisingly for the organizers and visitors to the exhibition, in a piano action by Joseph Beuys, who, "dressed like a pianist in dark grey flannel, black bow tie and without a hat", with an axe and a pair of shoes had been smashed and maltreated on the opening night.

An inverted plaster head hung in the toilet, a mannequin lay in the bathroom bathtub with its head under water, and in the hallway, Schallplatten-Schaschliks, skewers on which different records could be played simultaneously, invited people to experiment with music, while "in the boiler room, tinny sound objects prompted acoustic / interactive action." In a television room, there were twelve televisions manipulated by Paik, which reproduced the current television program as distorted images, grids or lines. The audience could use foot switches to influence what they saw. The disturbance became a creative element. Beuys was one of the first to recognize this exhibition, which is considered the birth of video art in today's art historical research, as an important milestone for art and wrote in a letter to Jährling, dated May 18, 1963, that he considered the "wonderful Paik thing [...] to be a historic act and for which" [he would like to express] "once again" [his] "utmost respect."

==== 9-No-Décollages 1963 ====
Rolf Jährling arranged an exhibition of his décollages with Wolf Vostell, who regularly visited the exhibition openings of Galerie Parnass around 1962. The exhibition opening was planned for September 14, 1963, and a six-hour Happening entitled 9-Nein-Décollagen was to take place. Vostell planned to organize the happening in the form of a four-hour bus trip to nine different locations in Wuppertal and envisaged the deployment of police officers to secure the planned collision of two steam locomotives with a Mercedes-Benz.

Rolf Jährling had to use his contacts in the city of Wuppertal for this project and wrote a letter to his Rotary friend Friedrich Laemmerhold, the president of the Wuppertal Federal Railroad Directorate, who approved the happening on a disused German Federal Railroad site. As Vostell stipulated that all crossings should only be crossed at red lights, Wuppertal's mayor Heinz Frowein arranged for the bus tour to be accompanied by a police escort. In addition, the participants of the happening - the guests - were locked in a sparsely lit barred cage in the factory building of a weaving mill; an artificial "guard dog" simulated a threatening living situation. The Vostell exhibition with 71 works was opened at 10 p.m. after the exhausted guests had disembarked from their buses. Vostell, who used his idea of décollage to commemorate Auschwitz concentration camp, showed his installation Cycle The Black Room from 1958 for the first time, a pitch-black room in which three of his décollage assemblages were placed on pedestals. The only light sources were provided by the spotlight attached to the base of Auschwitz Spotlight 568, a relic from this very death camp, and the spotlight in German View (Note: Wolf Vostell: Deutscher Ausblick aus dem Zyklus Das schwarze Zimmer, 1958–1963) integrated television. Treblinka, the third assemblage, showed, among other things, a part of a motorcycle, a transistor radio and a film that had been found in a cannibalized camera.

==== Front garden exhibition 1964 ====
At the beginning of 1964, the Capitalist Realism group asked Jährling Jährling "if they could show their stuff." They were able to, and a little later the members were at the front door in a small van with a tarpaulin. Konrad Fischer-Lueg, Gerhard Richter, Sigmar Polke and Manfred Kuttner, then still students at the Düsseldorfer Kunstakademie, had leaned their works, some of them large-scale, against the wall of the house and against the trees and bushes in the snow-covered front garden.

Gerhard Richter, Sigmar Polke and Konrad Lueg had their actual exhibition, entitled New Realists, on November 20, 1964, but without the participation of Manfred Kuttner. The exhibition included large-format works such as the Bomber (Note: Gerhard Richter: Bomber, 1963) and the Hirsch (Note: Gerhard Richter: Hirsch, 1963) by Richter, the tennis player by Polke and the soccer player (Note: Konrad Richter-Lueg: Fußballspieler (Memento of October 29, 2013 in the Internet Archive), 1963) by Konrad Lueg. Richter's work Helen, conceived as a diptych, was shown in one version. During the exhibition, Gerhard Richter received a commission from the collector Fänn Schniewind to paint a portrait of her husband.

==== 24-hour Happening 1965 ====
On June 5, 1965, at an unusual time of day, the so-called 24-hour happening, which began at midnight and ended at midnight, took place and surpassed all previous events at Galerie Parnass in terms of intensity. The artists Joseph Beuys, Bazon Brock, Charlotte Moorman, Nam June Paik, Eckart Rahn, Tomas Schmit and Wolf Vostell spread out in the various rooms of the villa, the floor plan of which can be seen on the event poster – various activities took place everywhere.

Wolf Vostell's action entitled The Consequences of the Emergency Laws consisted of him lying on the floor and sticking pins into the pieces of raw meat and offal lying next to him. Then, wearing a gas mask, he sat down in a glass box with atomized flour and a vacuum cleaner. Students from the Werkkunstschule Wuppertal sat in a cage frame made of wooden slats, draped with pieces of meat and chewing on pieces of meat.

Joseph Beuys was the only person to perform his action entitled und in uns ... unter uns ... landunter for the entire 24 hours in a room of about forty square meters called the "studio", squatting or lying with minimal movements on an orange crate covered with a white oilcloth. At times, without leaving the box, he would reach out for objects - including a tape recorder, record player, loudspeaker, a zinc box of grease, an alarm clock, two stopwatches and his son's small boxing gloves - some of which were out of his reach. Time and again, he held his head just above a wedge of grease in a hovering situation or let his feet hover just above the ground and sporadically picked up one of the two two-handled spades he had made - community spade -, each rammed into a board, and held it in front of his vest.

Bazon Brock, the literary figure among the actionists, exhibited everyday objects that he had collected in the Jährlings' household as traces of life, among other things and stood upside down in front of a slowly rotating disk, behind which was another fixed disk, in whose window a new letter appeared and disappeared every 15 minutes. At the end of the 24 hours, the letters formed the text "According to experimental results, one gram of cobra venom kills 83 dogs, 715 rats, 330 rabbits or 134 humans".

Eckart Rahn played a kind of noise music with loudspeakers, microphone, monotonously played recorder and double bass, and Thomas Schmit had set up 24 buckets in a circle in his action without an audience and occupied himself with pouring over the available water in a water bucket until the available water had disappeared. The action was interrupted as soon as an audience entered the room.

The concert by Nam June Paik and Charlotte Moorman, who played pieces by John Cage, Morton Feldman, La Monte Young and Ludwig van Beethoven, caused the biggest stir. Moorman, dressed only in a transparent cello dress and playing cello, occasionally dipped into a water bath to continue playing soaking wet, destroyed a mirror and stroked her cello as if in a trance, only to maltreat it the next moment. Meanwhile, Nam June Paik seemed to have fallen asleep on the keys of his piano. The next morning, his remote-controlled Robot K-456 experienced a new experience, (Note: For the name of the robot, Nam June Paik chose the designation "K 456" from the catalog raisonné of Wolfgang Amadeus Mozart's works, whereby the number 456 is the Piano Concerto No. 18, composed for Maria Theresia Paradis, labeled. See also Wulf Herzogenrath: More than painting. From Bauhaus to video sculpture. Lindinger + Schmid, Regensburg 1994, ISBN 3-929970-10-4, p. 309 f. and Wolfgang Amadeus Mozart (1756–1791): Piano Concerto No. 18, www.klassika.info, retrieved on August 18, 2011) a man-sized figure made of wood and wire with female features, (Note: Nam June Paik: K-456, 1965) on Moltkestraße in Robot Opera, his first public appearance in Europe. He could speak, move around, shake his head, separate his arms and hands and - what was particularly important to Paik - move his breasts individually, even digest it by eliminating beans. As the first non-human action artist, he was to be used in all future street actions.

The following day, Eva and Joseph Beuys appeared to help Rolf and Anneliese Jährling clean up the villa. Wolf Vostell's pieces of meat and offal lying around in the garden were buried, and Stella Baum gave them Jacutin tablets, a fumigant against storage pests and other vermin such as bugs and flies in rooms.

As Rolf and Anneliese Jährling had decided to travel through Africa in a VW bus in 1965, they bid farewell with one last lavish party and the announcement that they intended to open an architecture firm in Kenya with an adjoining gallery for European-African art exchange. Jährling dissolved the "Galerie Parnass", which had existed since 1949, in September 1965 after almost 17 years of gallery activity.

==== Publication "24 hours" ====
The gallery owner Rolf Jährling and Ute Klophaus, who documented the 24-hour happening photographically, were declared co-authors and action participants by the actors following this happening. In the same year, the book 24 Stunden, published by Margot Hansen, was published by Hansen & Hansen, Itzehoe-Vosskate. It contains, partly on two bound Leporellos, photographs by Ute Klophaus, notes and texts by the actors, such as Das Mittelwort by Rolf Jährling, Charlotte Moorman's cello, the Energy Plan by Joseph Beuys and Pensée 1965 by Nam June Paik, who in it ruminates on cybernetics and drugs and prophesies the victory of conceptual art over popular mass art. Bazon Brock's longer text on 24 Stunden Wuppertal 5. 6. 65 records events and sensations during the action and remarks in view of the attention: "with Vostell 5 people, with Beuys all, with me none." He also describes how "Wenzel", the son of Joseph Beuys, "so visibly the only one" surrenders to his "narrated story" at lunchtime "until 1 pm". In addition, the book object contains a square cut-out in the back section across several pages, in which a plastic bag filled with flour by Wolf Vostell is wedged. If you remove the bag, the following addition appears in the now open window: "beschäftigen/ sie sich/ 24 stunden/ mit mehl".

=== Africa and the last few years ===
After Rolf and Anneliese Jährling had traveled through twelve African countries in a VW bus from 1965 to 1966, Jährling worked in Addis Ababa from 1968 to 1974 as an architect and planning adviser at the Economic Commission for Africa for the United Nations. During this time, he specifically collected Ethiopian folk painting. He bought the works from dealers at the markets, without in most cases succeeding in making direct contact with the artists. Works from the Jährling Africa Collection were shown for the first time in 1979 at the exhibition Modern Art from Africa at the Berliner Festspiele on the occasion of the festival Horizonte - Festival of World Cultures, which featured works by artists such as Cheri Samba, Twin Seven Seven and others. The cover of the novel The Thirteenth Sun by Daniachew Worku, published in 1981 by Philipp Reclam jun. in Leipzig, was designed using the painting Life and Work in the Countryside by Tilahun Mammo from the Jährling Collection.

At the same time, Anneliese Jährling, who had become interested in modern art through her husband, began producing textile sculptures of various sizes in Addis Ababa using the crochet technique. In December 1970, the Goethe-Institut in Addis Ababa dedicated a first exhibition to the crochet works in its building under the title Dancers. The printed catalogs were all crocheted by Anneliese Jährling.

After his return from Addis Ababa in 1975, Rolf Jährling lived in seclusion in Weidingen in the Eifel until his death in 1991, but with a keen interest in art. After the death of her husband, Anneliese Jährling moved to live with her family in Cologne, where she died on June 1, 2010. Since 1994, the archive of Galerie Parnass has been part of the Central Archive of the International Art Trade.

== Rolf and Anneliese Jährling Collection ==
The year in which Galerie Parnass was founded in 1949 also marked the beginning of Rolf Jährling's collecting activities. Together with his wife Anneliese Jährling, works by Alexander Calder, Emil Schumacher, Bernard Schultze, Heinz Trökes, Gerhard Hoehme, Peter Brüning, Heinz Kreutz, Raoul Ubac, Wolf Vostell and others were acquired. Large parts of the collection are now in the Von der Heydt-Museum in Wuppertal, such as the Mobile/Stabile by Calder from 1952, Schumacher's Lichtes Feld from 1955, Schulze's In Memoriam Altdorfer, created around 1949, the Kleine Hymne an Blau by Hoehme from 1956, a Kruzifix from 1946 by Ubac or Vostell's Cobaleleda from 1958. The couple also collected works by Werner Schriefers, Johannes Geccelli and Hans Platschek. The Jährling Africa Collection, which was assembled after 1965, contained works of African, primarily Ethiopian folk art.

== Reception ==
On May 31, 1982, the exhibition "Treffpunkt Parnass Wuppertal 1949-1965" took place at the Von der Heydt-Museum of the Wuppertal Art and Museum Association. It was conceived as a tribute to the work of Galerie Parnass; the opening was attended by many visitors and a number of companions, including Bazon Brock, Joseph Beuys and Nam June Paik, who had already been present at the 24-Stunden-Happening.

In spring 2009, the Von der Heydt-Museum repeated its reminiscence of the Galerie Parnass and paid tribute to the gallery's decisive influence on the post-war period and the commitment of private collectors in the exhibition "Privat - Wuppertaler Sammler der Gegenwart". On display were works from the collection of Rolf and Anneliese Jährling, as well as the collections of Stella and Gustav Adolf Baum, Jürgen and Hildegard Holze, Bazon Brock, Hans-Georg Lobeck and Christian Boros.

== Plant ==
Editions

- Micro-Macro. eight novographs by Heinz Trökes on poems by Alain Bouquet, Galerie Edition Parnass, Wuppertal 1957
- André Frénaud: Die Herberge Im Heiligtum und andere Gedichte, (German by Paul Pörtner), Galerie Parnass, Wuppertal 1959
- Will Grohmann: Alcopley – Voies et Traces No. 5, Galerie Panass, Wuppertal 1961
- Armin Sandig: landstriche & seestücke. oder wie die natur mich nachahmt Five etchings with a foreword by Will Grohmann, Galerie Panass, Wuppertal 1962
- Franz Roh: Metamorphoses. Figurative collages. Catalog, Galerie Parnass, Wuppertal 1963

Residential buildings

- 1949: Alte Freiheit 16-18, Wuppertal-Elberfeld; commercial building with penthouse, home of Galerie Parnass from 1950 to 1958
- 1953/54: Obere Lichtenplatzer Straße 263, Wuppertal-Lichtenplatz; client: Lord Mayor Hans Bremme
- 1957: Spessartweg 25, Wuppertal-Küllenhahn; client: Vereinigte Glanzstoff-Fabriken
- 1958: Funckstraße 13, Wuppertal-Brill; ground floor remodeling of the Villa Wolff built in 1891/92 by Heinrich Plange
- 1960: Wittelsbacherstraße 31 a, Wuppertal-Lichtenplatz; residential building with garage, client: Vereinigte Glanzstoff-Fabriken

Industrial buildings and office buildings

- 1958: Hatzfelder Straße 165, Wuppertal-Hatzfeld; office building, client: Ernst Pott, Maschinenfabrik
- 1960/61: Giebel 30, Beckamp bread factory, Wuppertal-Varresbeck; with office building, workshops, residential building for guest workers
- 1962: Kolk 29, Albert Zeisler car dealership, Wuppertal-Vohwinkel; with 36 meters of shop window frontage

== Literature ==
- 24 Stunden. Beuys, Brock, Jährling, Klophaus, Moorman, Paik, Rahn, Schmit, Vostell. Hansen & Hansen, Itzehoe-Voßkate, 1965.
- Helga Behn: Herzlich, Ihr Max. Künstlerpost aus den Beständen des ZADIK. Verlag für moderne Kunst Nürnberg, Hrsg. Zentralarchiv des Internationalen Kunsthandels e. V. ZADIK, Köln 2010, ISBN 978-3-86984-137-3
- Bogomir Ecker, Annette Tietenberg (Hrsg.): »24 STUNDEN« in Fotografien von Bodo Niederprüm, Wunderhorn, Heidelberg 2016, ISBN 978-3-88423-538-6
- Gerhard Finckh, Antje Birthälmer (Hrsg.): »Privat«. Wuppertaler Sammler der Gegenwart im Von der Heydt-Museum. Von der Heydt-Museum, Wuppertal 2009, ISBN 978-3-89202-073-8
- Ruth Meyer-Kahrweg: Architekten, Bauingenieure, Baumeister, Bauträger und ihre Bauten im Wuppertal. Pies, Sprockhövel 2003, ISBN 3-928441-52-3
- Sabine Schütz: Interview mit Rolf Jährling. In: Hans M. Schmidt, Klaus Honnef: Aus den Trümmern: Kunst und Kultur im Rheinland und Westfalen 1945–1952. Rheinland-Verlag, Köln 1985, ISBN 978-3-7927-0871-2, p. 505
- Das Theater ist auf der Straße. Die Happenings von Wolf Vostell. Katalog des Museums Morsbroich, Leverkusen zur Ausstellung 2010. Kerber, Bielefeld 2010, ISBN 978-3-86678-431-4
- Alfons W. Biermann: Treffpunkt Parnass Wuppertal, 1949–1965, Ausgabe 11 der Schriften des Rheinischen Museumsamtes, Rheinland-Verlag, 1980
