= Nina Kandinsky =

Russian art collector (1899–1980)

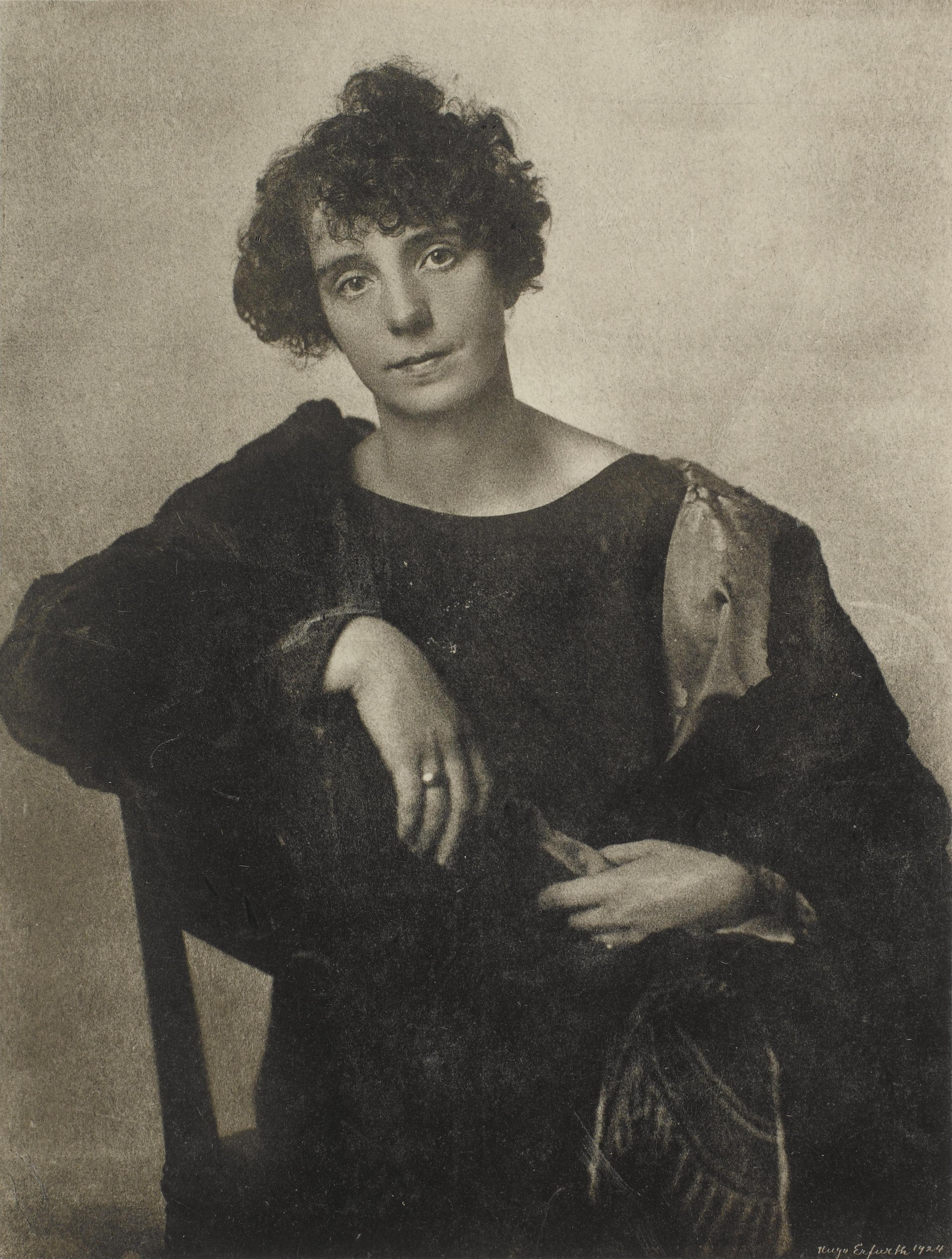
- Photograph by Hugo Erfurth, 1924
- Born: Nina Nikolaevna Andreevskaya; 27 January 1899; Moscow, Russia
- Died: 2 September 1980 (aged 81); Gstaad, Switzerland
- Resting place: Neuilly-sur-Seine, France
- Spouse: Wassily Kandinsky (m. 1917)
- Children: 1

Nina Nikolayevna Kandinsky or Kandinskaya (Russian: Нина Николаевна Кандинская; née Andreyevskaya; 27 January 1899 – 2 September 1980) was a Russian art collector and writer who was the second wife of Wassily Kandinsky.

After Wassily's death in 1944 she oversaw his estate, selling works to major museums, and after her death, she bequeathed her remaining collection of his works and documents to the Centre Pompidou. In 1963, she played an "important role" in securing the first loan of artwork from the Russian government to an American museum since before WWII. She published Wassily und ich: Mein leben mit einem großen Künstler in 1976 and established the Société Kandinsky at the Centre Pompidou in 1979. She was murdered in 1980.

== Early life ==
Nina Nikolayevna Andreyevskaya was the daughter of a Russian official. In 1916, when she met Wassily Kandinsky, she was living with her widowed mother and sister and working at the Visual Arts Section (IZQ) in the People's Commissariat for Enlightenment (NARKOMPROS) in Moscow.

== Relationship with Wassily Kandinsky ==
Nina met the Russian artist Wassily Kandinsky in May 1916. He had just ended a relationship with German artist Gabriele Münter. Nina and Wassily had previously spoken on the phone and Wassily, inspired by her voice, painted En Hommage a Une Voix Inconnue (In Tribute to an Unknown Voice). They met for the first time at the Pushkin Museum, and married in Moscow six months later, on 11 February 1917, travelling to Finland for their honeymoon. They spent the summer in a dacha in Achtyrka, and "were hardly apart for a single day" after that. Their only son, Vsevolod Vasilevich, was born in September 1917.

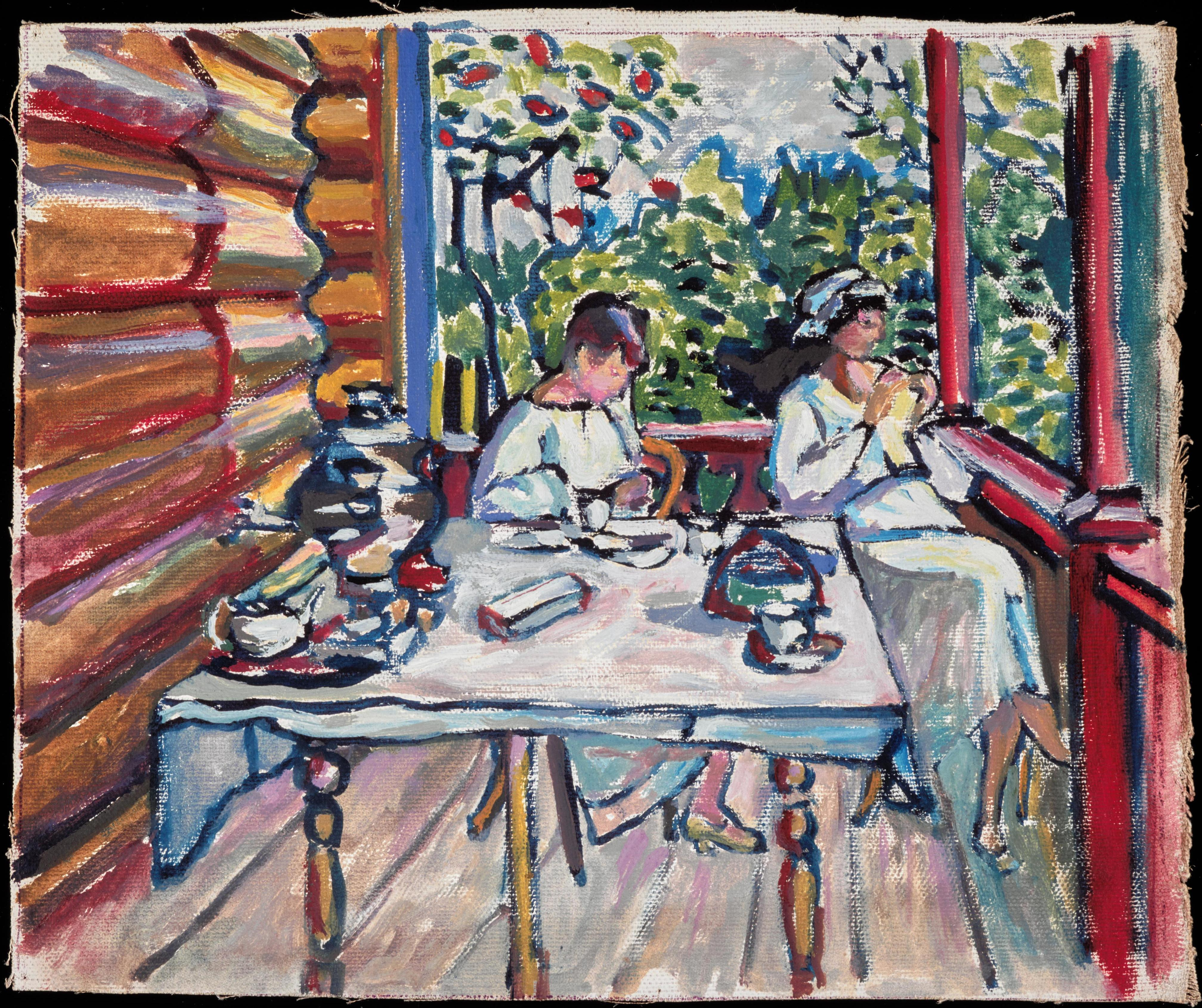
Achtyrka – Nina and Tatiana in the Veranda (1917)

After the 1917 October Revolution, Nina wrote in her diary about how their life in Moscow had become "unbearable" and that they "endured cold, hunger, and extreme hardship for years." The son died of a virus in June 1920.

In December 1921, Nina accompanied Wassily to visit Walter Gropius and the Bauhaus in Berlin. Wassily was invited to teach there in March 1922, and they moved to Motzstraße, Berlin where he started teaching that July.

From 1922 onwards, Nina began cataloguing the watercolours and oil paintings Wassily exhibited, including prices and other sale details. Around the same time, she arranged for Jean Leppien, a student of Kandinsky's, to translate Kandinsky's writing into French.

In June 1926, they moved to a new house, where their neighbours were Paul and Lily Klee. Nina would remain in touch with Lily after the Kandinskys moved to Paris in 1933, the pair writing to each other of "domestic problems, financial difficulties, and their fears of war." In 1928, the Kandinskys obtained German citizenship. Nina photographed the "famous first meeting between Kandinsky, Rebay and the Guggenheims" at Bauhaus Dessau in 1930.

Wassily gave Nina the following paintings as gifts:

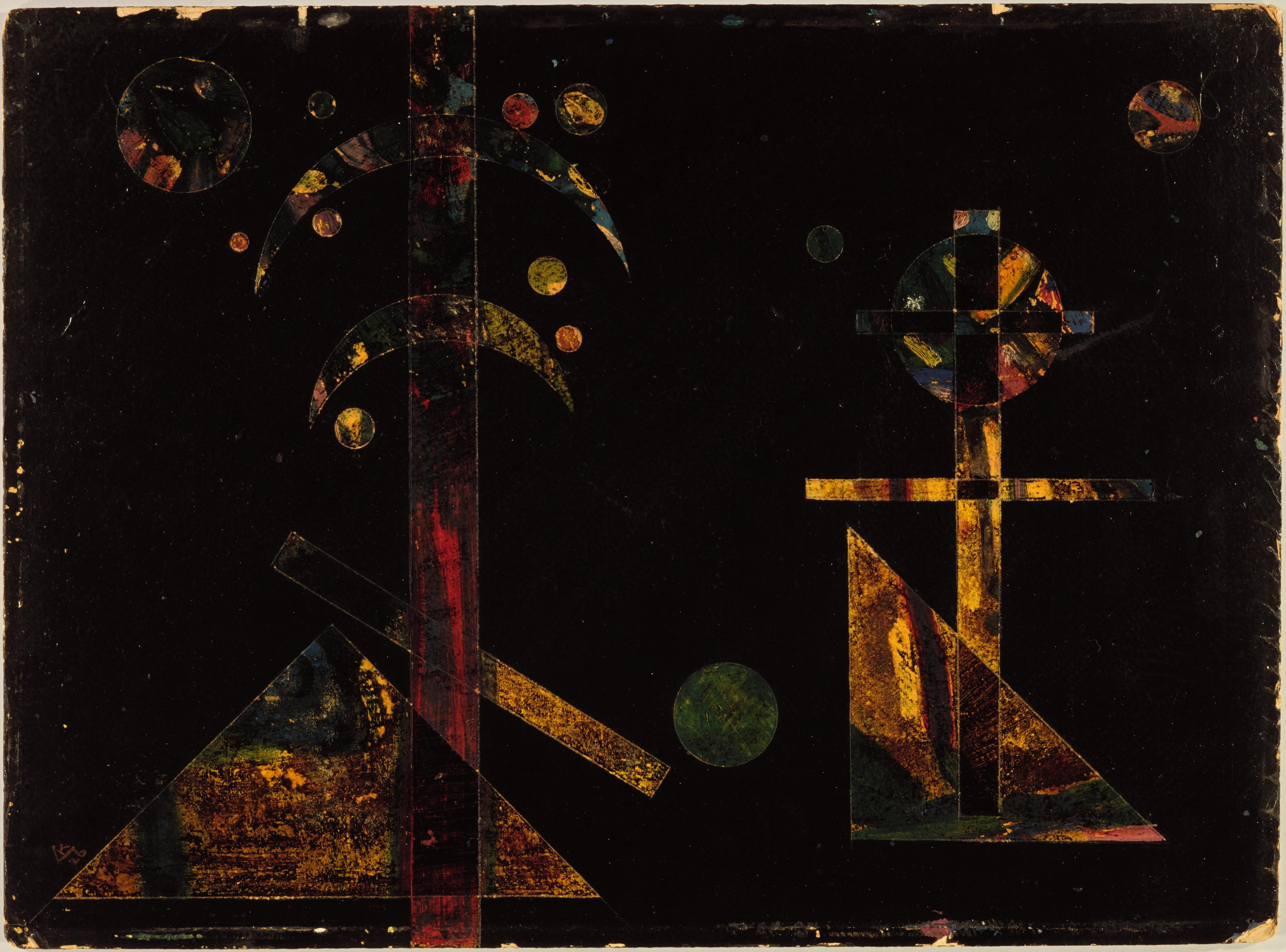
Nina (for Christmas) (1926)

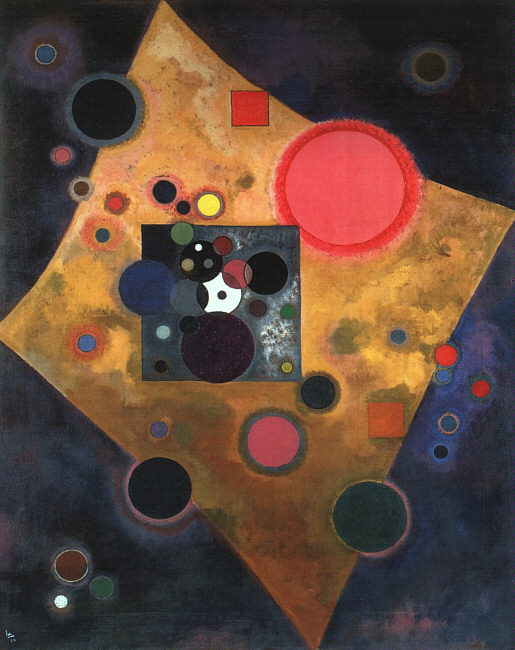
Accent in Pink (1930) for her birthday present

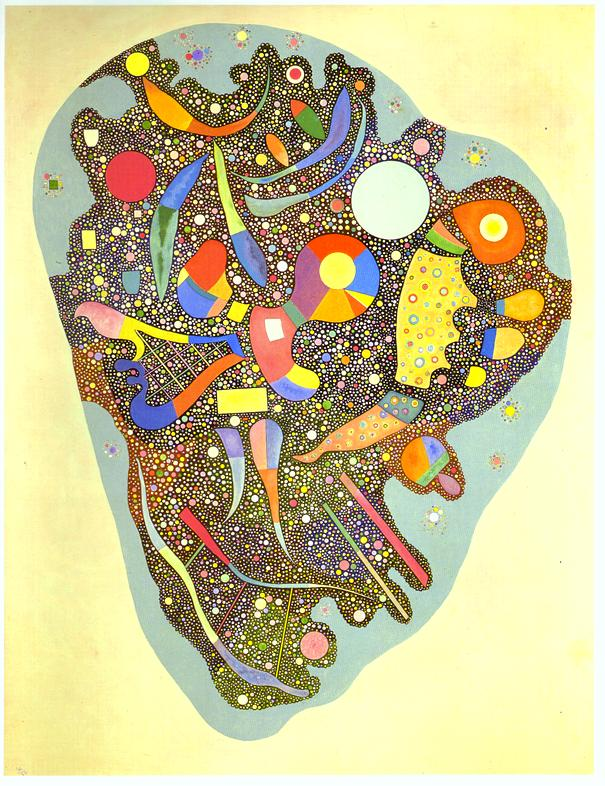
Colourful Ensemble (1938) as an Easter present.

When the Bauhaus was closed by the Nazis in 1933, the Kandinskys were "compelled to leave". They travelled to Paris where Marcel Duchamp suggested they stay at Neuilly-sur-Seine. They hoped that they might return to Germany, but after a year they settled in France and never returned to Germany. This was where Wassily died in 1944.

In 1938, there was a major retrospective of Wassily's work at the Guggenheim, New York, which was "meticulously planned by Kandinsky and his wife". The art collector Peggy Guggenheim "did not get along with the proprietary and businesslike Nina."

Having sought French citizenship since 1934, the Kandinskys were granted it in July 1939. Their German passports had expired and were not renewed. In 1941, the American journalist Varian Fry arranged for the Kandinskys to obtain a visa for America, but they decided to stay in France.

== Managing Wassily's legacy ==
Of the role of artist's widow, she said, "The artist's widow is the guardian and administrator. She is courted, loved, coveted, detested, flattered and harassed. She is accused of being difficult, vain, arrogant, capricious, unsociable, jealous, despotic, avaricious and egocentric."

Three months after Wassily died, his having "never enjoyed the recognition he craved", Nina "took matters in hand", and contacted René Drouin, the owner of one of the few galleries that stayed open during the Occupation. She sent him "twelve canvases and three oil paintings on cardboard for a retrospective", repeating this three further times over the next three years.

The New York-based banker-turned-art-dealer Karl Nierendorf took on a large consignment of Wassily's works from Nina in the 1940s. When he died in 1947 the pieces were passed on to Leo Castelli for whom at that point "everything was going very badly. No money, nothing." The "windfall" of Kandinsky's works meant that Castelli's business could thrive. However, he "expended a lot of energy coping with the very difficult widow" and developed the opinion that "sometimes dealing with living artists is easier than dealing with dead ones, particularly if a difficult widow is part of the negotiations." When Sonia Delaunay was considering what to do about her own husband's legacy, even though she never liked Nina, "had to admit [she] was effective in organising shows everywhere."

In 1946, Nina provided "moral support" in establishing the Prix Kandinsky to "aid young artists working in the abstract mode". It was first awarded to Jean Dewasne and was awarded annually until 1957.

In 1947, Nina authorised a new version of Wassily's 1910 essay Uber das Geistige in der Kunst (The Art of Spiritual Harmony) called Concerning the Spiritual in Art, to which she added her own essay.

In the 1960s, Nina gave licence for a London-based jeweller to create jewellery pieces based on Wassily's art.

In 1962, Nina objected to the publication of a book by Lothar-Günther Buchheim, Der Blaue Reiter und die "Neue Künstervereinigung Münster" because of its reference to Wassily's earlier relationship with Münter. The objection was ultimately unsuccessful, and the book was published.

Nina would loan pieces from her collection to exhibitions, including to the San Francisco Museum of Art in 1952, the Steinburg Gallery, Washington Museum (1963), and the Museum of Modern Art in 1969. She was a "major lender" of works for a 1963 retrospective of Kandinsky's work at the Guggenheim, and played an "important role in negotiations in Moscow to make possible the unprecedented loan to the Guggenheim of 7 important Kandinsky works from Russian museum collections." This was the first loan by the Russian government to an American museum since before WWII.

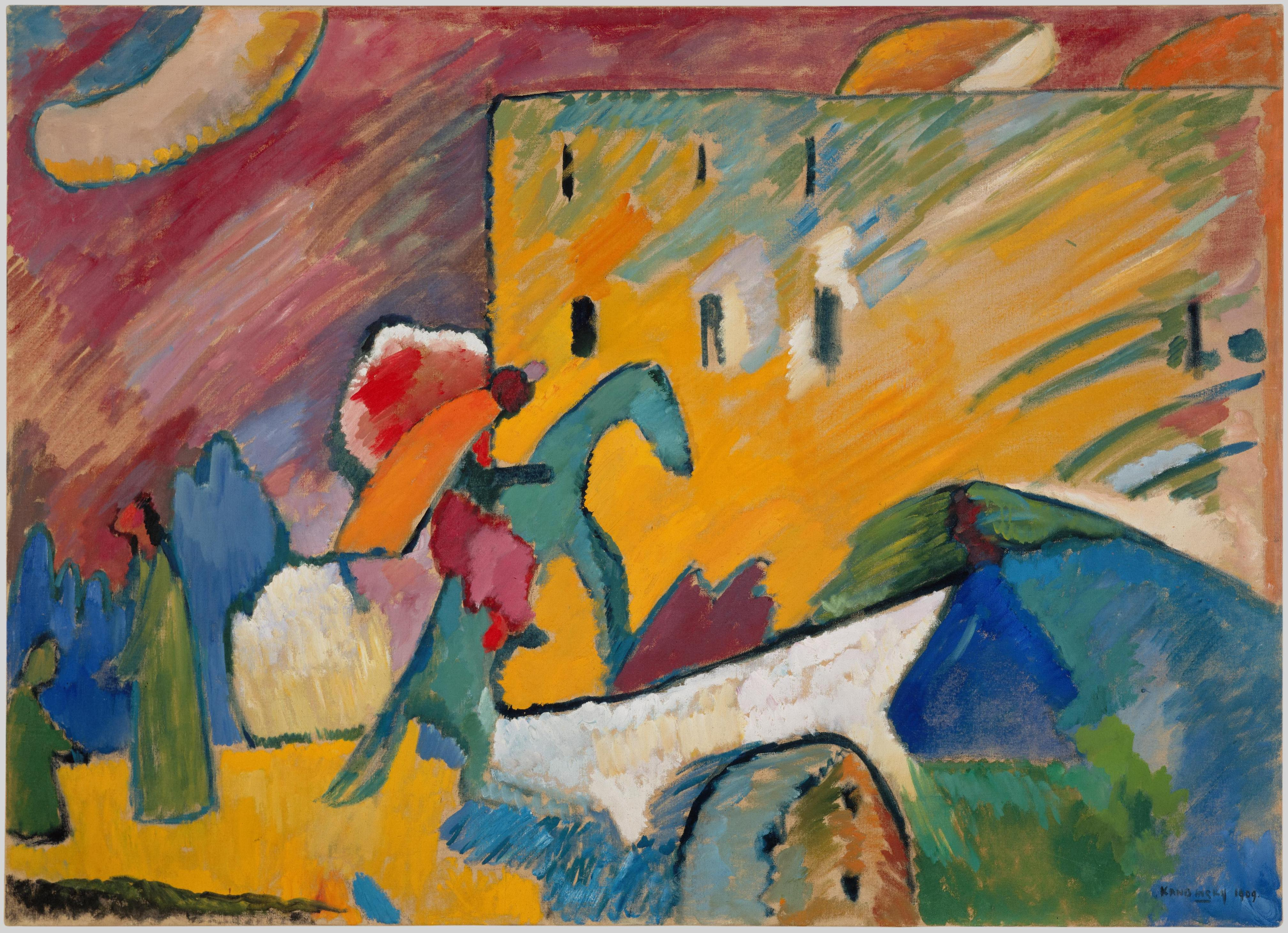
Improvisation III (1909)

Nina was friends with Georges and Claude Pompidou. Unlike the families of other artists such as Henri Laurens and Georges Rouault, she was an early supporter of the Centre Pompidou. While others protested against both the location of the building and its design, Nina made a donation of 15 paintings and 15 watercolours, including Improvisation III (1909) and Mit b (1912), to the centre in 1976, becoming its single biggest benefactor up until that point. This donation encouraged others to donate works, including those by Constantin Brâncuşi, Max Ernst, Joan Miró and Antoine Pevsner.

In the same year Nina published Wassily und ich: Mein leben mit einem großen Künstler. Her intention of the book was to "dot the i's, because critics often don't do their research."

In 1977, she was a guest of honour at the 40th anniversary of the Solomon R Guggenheim Foundation.

She would keep a "sharp eye" on exhibitions of Wassily's work and would also authenticate his work, saying in 1978 "So many fakes – I saw 20 last year." Regarding this process of authentication, the American gallery owner Richard L. Feigen described needing to have a Kandinsky work authenticated by Nina. He wrote "As I walked over to her with the painting in my hand, from a slight distance she said "That's a Kandinsky of 1904." But when she read the inscription [Münter 06 – possibly a dedication to his former partner], she said "This is not a Kandinsky." According to Nina, no Kandinsky ever owned by Münter was a Kandinsky."

In 1979, she founded the Société Kandinsky, based at the Centre Pompidou, "to protect and promote the artist's oeuvre". In January 1980, she donated everything of Wassily's work that remained in her possession to the Centre.

== Writing ==
- Concerning the spiritual in art (1942) - essay
- Special Loan of Paintings from the USSR (1963) Pub. Solomon R Guggenheim Museum – essay
- Kandinsky, Nina Kandinsky: Aquarelle und Zeichnungen (1972) Pub. Galerie Beyeler
- Kandinsky, Nina Wassily und ich: Mein leben mit einem großen Künstler (1976) Pub. Droemer Knaur ISBN 9783426722268

== After Wassily's death ==
After Wassily died in 1944, Nina remained in their Neuilly-sur-Paris home, changing "as little as possible" until her death 36 years later. Wassily's studio remained as he left it in 1944.

The couple had lived a fairly frugal life, but after Wassily's death, as the value of his work increased significantly, Nina was able to indulge an interest in fine jewellery. She would hold a tea party every New Year's Day to which Yvan Le Tourneur of Van Cleef & Arpels was always invited, so she could "admire and select the jewellery she would buy that year." She had a particular passion for emeralds. In the 1970s she had a chalet built in Gstaad, Switzerland which she called "Chalet Esmerelda". In total Nina gave the Pompidou Centre 113 oil paintings, 741 watercolours and drawings, "numerous works" by other artists (including unframed Klees) and a vast archive of papers.

She received seven decorations from the French government, including the Legion d'Honneur.

=== Murder ===
Nina was attacked and murdered in her chalet on 2 September 1980. She had been strangled. The suspected motive was robbery. US$2 million worth of jewellery, including a $930,000 Cartier necklace that she had recently purchased, was taken, but no artwork. There was a continent-wide search for the killer, but nobody was ever charged with the crime. Fourteen people attended her funeral in Paris. She was buried in Neuilly-sur-Seine.

Chalet Esmerelda was sold for US$1.14 million in 1983, and the proceeds were donated to the French state. The 1983 exhibition Kandinsky: Russian and Bauhaus Years 1915–1933 at the Guggenheim Museum was dedicated to the memory of Nina.

== Sources ==
- Richardson, John. Kandinsky's Merry Widow (Feb 1995). Vanity Fair, p. 128.
