= Graphism =

Expression of thought in material symbols

Graphism is the expression of thought in material symbols. Graphism began some 30,000 years BC, not as a photographic representation of reality but as an abstraction that was geared toward magical-religious matters. Early graphism then was a form of writing that constitutes a "symbolic transposition, not copying of reality".

== The birth of graphism ==
The earliest traces of graphism date back to 30,000 years BC at the end of the Mousterian period and the Chatelperronian period toward 35,000 BC. While it can be claimed that language merely represents a logical development of the vocal signals of the animal world, nothing comparable to the writing and reading of symbols existed before the dawn of homo sapiens. While motor function determines expression in the techniques and language of all anthropoids, reflection determines graphism in the figurative language of the most recent anthropoids.

It has been hypothesized that graphism first appeared in the form of tight curves or series of lines engraved in bone or stone. However, there has been no substantial proof to support this hypothesis, with the only comparison being the Australian tjurunga, stone or wood tablets engraved with abstract designs (spirals, straight lines, and clusters of dots) that represented objects of religious significance. The first forms of graphism that allow one to hazardly identify an animal, did not appear until around 30,000 B.C. Prehistoric art records are very numerous, and statistical processing has allowed us to unravel the general meaning of what they represented. The earliest known paintings do not represent a hunt or a family scene, but are graphic building blocks without any associated description. All these early forms therefore suggests that figurative art was directly linked with language and was, in the broadest sense, much closer to writing than to what we understand by a work of art. It was symbolic transposition, not copying of reality, that is to say that graphism did not begin by reproducing reality in a slavishly photographic manner, but with abstraction.

The discovery of prehistoric art in the late 19th century raised the issue of a "naive" state, an art by which humans supposedly represented what they saw as a result of an aesthetic triggering effect. It was soon realized near the beginning of the 20th century that this view was mistaken, and that magical-religious concerns were responsible for the figurative art of the Cenozoic Era, as indeed for almost all art except in a few rare "hunting tallies" etched on bone during the Paleolithic period.

== See also ==
- Graphism thesis
- Calligraphy
- Typography
- Graphic design
