= Rolf Nesch =

German painter

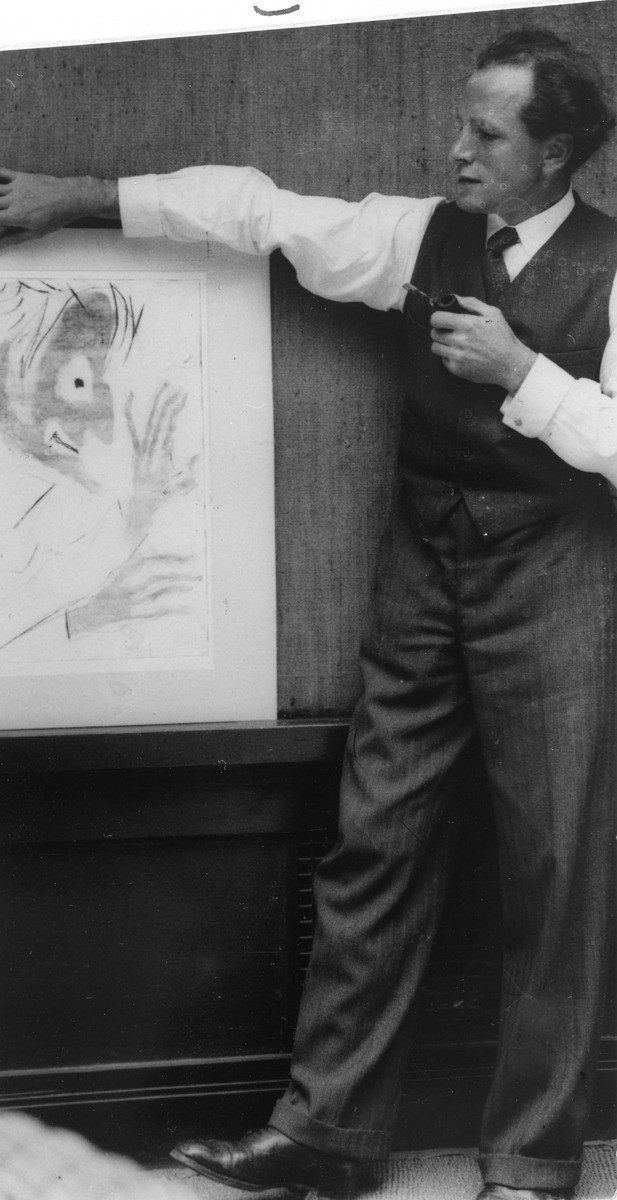
Rolf Nesch (ca. 1925)

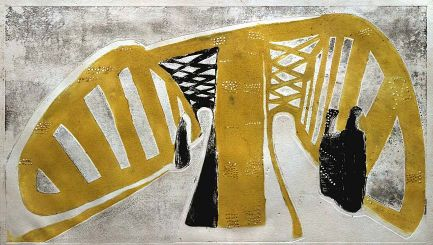
Elbe Bridge I (1932)

Rolf (Emil Rudolf) Nesch (January 7, 1893 – October 27, 1975) was a German-born Norwegian expressionist artist, especially noted for his printmaking.

== Career ==
Nesch was born at Esslingen am Neckar in Baden-Württemberg, Germany. He was the son of August Nesch (1867–1922) and Emilie Langbein (1869–1944). Nesch grew up in Württemberg. He studied at the State Academy of Fine Arts Stuttgart (1908–12) and Dresden Academy of Fine Arts (1912–14).

He participated in World War I which led to his British captivity (1917–19). In the following years, he lived in Dresden, partly in Berlin and in the hometown of Esslingen. In 1929 he settled in Hamburg to continue his artistic career. Nesch worked in parallel with painting and graphics. He was influenced by expressionism in general, especially Ernst Ludwig Kirchner and Edvard Munch. Upon the Nazi takeover in Germany in 1933, Nesch relocated to Norway. An established artist in Germany, he found the initial period in Norway to be difficult. After a few years, the situation improved and he found support from, among others, Pola Gauguin and Rolf Stenersen. Nesch became a Norwegian citizen in the fall of 1946. In 1950, he married actress Ragnhild Hald (1896-1975) in New York City.

After moving to Norway, Nesch focused on other sculptures besides graphics. Nesch had a large production of art which included graphics, material images, painting, sculpture and drawings. Nesch also found a suitable medium in metal pressure technology. Apart from drawing, which was his natural tool and means of expression throughout, it was printmaking he devoted himself to continuously and over the greatest number of years. It is as printmaker that Rolf Nesch made his most significant contribution, not merely as a technical innovator who discovered the potential in new materials and methods, but also from the artistic point of view.

He was appointed a Knight of the Royal Norwegian Order of St. Olav (1967) and Commander (1973). He was awarded the Prince Eugen Medal (1973). Nesch died in 1975 in Oslo. The National Gallery of Norway owns eleven material pictures, three sculptures as well as other graphic by Rolf Nesch. Nesch-museet opened in 1993 at Ål, where he had lived for twenty-five years.

== Other sources ==
- Helliesen, Sidsel and Bodil Sørensen (2009) Rolf Nesch: The Complete Graphic Works (Skira Rizzoli Publishing; Milano) ISBN 978-88-572-0400-0
- Kristiansen, Runar (1998) Edvard Munch, Nikolai Astrup, Rolf Nesch, Ludvig Eikaas (Skei i Jølster : Jølster kommune) ISBN 82-91882-01-0

=== Further reading ===
- Jan Askeland (1969) The Graphic Art of Rolf Nesch (Detroit Institute of Arts)
- Eivind Otto Hjelle (1998) Rolf Nesch (Oslo: Gyldendal)
- Sidsel Helliesen and Eivind Otto Hjelle (1976) Rolf Nesch på teaterturne til Finnmark, Oslo
- Alfred Hentzen and Wolf Stubbe (1973)Rolf Nesch. Graphik, Berlin
- Alfred Hentzen (1960) Rolf Nesch. Graphik, Materialbilder, Plastik, Stuttgart
- Max Sauerlandt, Gustav Schiefler and Wolf Stubbe et al., (1977) Rolf Nesch: Karl Muck og hans orkester, Oslo
- Wolf Stubbe, (1965) Der Zyklus St.Pauli von Rolf Nesch, Jahrbuch der Hamburger Kunstsammlungen
- Wolf Stubbe (1985) Tiere anders gesehen. Tierzeichnungen von Rolf Nesch, Hamburg
- Eva Wiik (1994) Min venn Rolf Nesch, Oslo
