= Morsbroich Museum =

Coordinates: 51°02′10″N 7°02′00″E

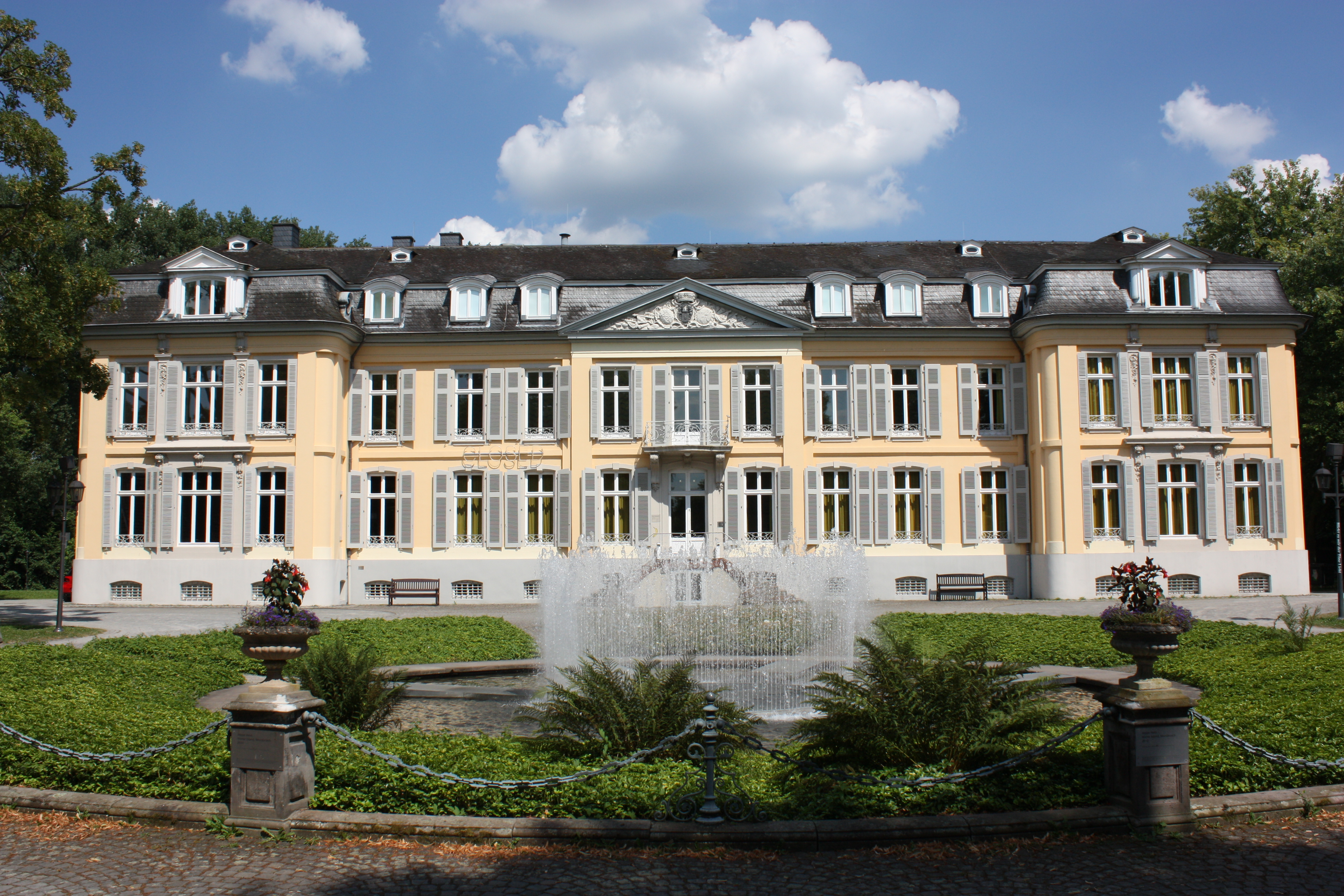
The museum's exterior in 2016

The Morsbroich Museum (German: Museum Morsbroich) or Morsbroich Castle Municipal Museum (Städtisches Museum Schloss Morsbroich) is a German museum of modern art situated in Leverkusen, 20 km north of Cologne.

== History ==
A building referred to as a castle was mentioned in 1328, and acted as the headquarters of the Teutonic Order from 1619; though by 1774 it was derelict, and demolished, being replaced by the present Baroque palace, and the English garden laid out. It was extended in 1885 with two more wings.

In 1974, it was sold to the city of Leverkusen and subsequently renovated in order to permanently function as the city's museum of modern art from 1985.

The museum was the first one in North Rhine-Westphalia explicitly exhibiting works by famous international post-war painters, sculptors and installation artists. It presented artists such as Yves Klein, Lucio Fontana, Louise Nevelson, Andy Warhol, Burhan Dogancay and Robert Motherwell. During the last 50 years, it collected 400 paintings and sculptures and 5000 prints by contemporary artists.

In 2009, the museum was named "museum of the year" by the German section of the International Association of Art Critics. A report by KPMG published in February 2016 suggested closing the museum to reduce costs.
