= Alberto Magnelli =

Italian artist (1888–1971)

- Born: 1 July 1888; Florence, Italy
- Died: 20 April 1971 (aged 82); Paris, France
- Known for: Painting
- Movement: Concrete art
- Awards: São Paulo Biennial 1951, second prize

Alberto Magnelli (1 July 1888 – 20 April 1971) was an Italian modern painter who was a significant figure in the post war Concrete art movement.

== Biography ==
Magnelli was born in Florence on July 1, 1888. In 1907 he started painting and, despite lacking formal art education, by 1909 he was established enough to be included in the Venice Biennale. His initial works were in a Fauvist style. Magnelli joined the Florentine avant-garde befriending artists including Ardengo Soffici and Gino Severini. He also visited Paris where he met Guillaume Apollinaire and the Cubists including Pablo Picasso, Fernand Léger, and Alexander Archipenko. By 1915 he had adopted an abstract style incorporating cubist and futurist elements.

Over the next few years Magnelli returned to figurative work and drifted away from the Italian avant-garde, which was becoming more supportive of Fascism, which he opposed. By 1931 he had returned to abstraction in the form of concrete art featuring geometric shapes and overlapping planes. He moved to Paris, where he joined the Abstraction-Création group and became friends with Wassily Kandinsky, Jean Arp and Sophie Taeuber. Following the invasion of France by the Nazis, Magnelli and his future wife, Susi Gerson, went to live in Grasse with several other artists including the Arps. Some of the group, including Gerson, were Jewish so they were forced to hide. Despite this, the group was able to produce a number of collaborative works.

Following the Second World War, Magnelli returned to Paris which was to be his home for the rest of his life. He became a major figure in the post war concrete art movement and influenced artists such as Victor Vasarely, Nicolas de Staël as well as the concrete artists in South America such as Hélio Oiticica. He again exhibited at the Venice Biennale, this time with a whole room. Major galleries organised retrospectives of his work.

Magnelli died on 20 April 1971 at his home in Meudon, Paris.

== Key exhibitions ==
- Venice Biennale (1909)
- Galleria Materassi, Florence (1921) (his first solo exhibition)
- Pesaro Gallery, Milan (1929)
- Galerie Pierre, Paris (1934) (his first major exhibition in Paris)
- Nierendorf Gallery, New York (1937) (his first solo exhibition in the USA)
- René Drouin Gallery (1947)
- Venice Biennale (1950)
- São Paulo Biennial (1951) (awarded second prize)
- Palace of Fine Arts, Brussels (1954) (his first full retrospective exhibition)
- Stedelijk Van Abbemuseum, Eindhoven (1955)
- Documenta II, Kassel (1955)
- Kunsthaus, Zürich (1963) (major retrospective celebrating his 75th birthday)
- Museum of Modern Art, Paris (1968)
