= Wols =

German painter

- Wols, 1940, self-portraits
- Born: 27 May 1913; Berlin, German Empire
- Died: 1 September 1951 (aged 38); Paris, France
- Known for: Painting, photography, installation
- Notable work: It's All Over The City (1947), Aile de papillon (1947), Composition jaune (1947), Auberginenfarbene Komposition (1947), La Turquoise (1949)
- Movement: Tachisme, lyrical abstraction

Wols was the pseudonym of Alfred Otto Wolfgang Schulze (27 May 1913 – 1 September 1951), a German painter and photographer predominantly active in France. Though broadly unrecognized in his lifetime, he is considered a pioneer of lyrical abstraction, one of the most influential artists of the Tachisme movement. He is the author of a book on art theory entitled Aphorismes de Wols.

== Biography ==
Alfred Otto Wolfgang Schulze was born in Berlin in 1913 into a wealthy family; his father was a high-ranking civil servant and patron of the arts who maintained friendships with many prominent artists of the period, including Otto Dix. In 1919, the family moved to Dresden, where subsequently he found his love for art in 1927. In 1924, Schulze was given a still camera, an event that, along with the death of his father in 1929, became one of the defining moments of his life. In 1930 he began to pursue an apprenticeship with his camera at the Reiman-Schule, the Berlin school of applied art. He was a multifaceted man who was capable of teaching German, painting, and capturing photographs of portrait landscape.

Wols (Alfred Otto Wolfgang Schulze), 1946–47, untitled, oil on canvas, Franz Haniel & Cie.

After abandoning school, Schulze pursued several interests, including ethnography before moving to Paris in 1932 on the advice of László Moholy-Nagy. After visiting Germany in 1933, he decided not to return, instead traveling to Barcelona, Mallorca, and Ibiza, where he worked odd jobs, including a stint as a taxicab driver and a German tutor.While he was in Barcelona, he did not listen to the call-up for the labor services in Germany and was arrested in Spain, and he did not have a passport, so he spent a few months in prison in Barcelona.

In 1936, he received official permission to live in Paris with the help of Fernand Léger; as an army deserter, Schulze had to report to the Paris police on a monthly basis. Beginning in 1937, he actively worked on his photographs, which were shown in many of Paris's most prestigious galleries. He befriended luminaries of the period, including Max Ernst and Jacques Prévert. As a German national, Schulze (like Ernst) was interned at the start of World War II, he was then incarcerated originally in the State de Colombes in Paris, and after that, he was moved from camp to camp, moving south until he reached his final camp at Camp des Miles where he passed the time drawing and painting in watercolor, but he managed to escape and hide in Cassis near Marseille In 1942 he fled from the Germans to the safety of Montélimar.

He spent most of the war trying to emigrate to the United States, an unsuccessful and costly enterprise that may have driven him to alcoholism. Upon his return to Paris, after the hype from the war had died down, he had his first exhibition of watercolors in December 1945 at the Galerie René Drouin, where despite the lack of commercial success he made an impression on the circle of intellectuals around the gallery. These included Jean Paulhan, Francis Ponge, Georges Limbour and André Malraux. The small works were displayed in light boxes. A second exhibition in the same gallery two years later saw greater recognition. His paintings represented a rejection of figuration and abstraction, and a projection into a metaphysical plane.

Wols (Alfred Otto Wolfgang Schulze), 1947, It's All Over The City

In the years following the war, Schulze concentrated on painting and etching. His health declined severely towards the end of the 1940s; in 1951 he died of food poisoning at the Hotel Montalembert in Paris, after releasing himself from hospital against medical advice. After his death his works were shown at the Kassel documenta (1955), documenta II (1959) and documenta III (1964).

=== Artistic style ===
Wols' painting style, as early as 1946–47 (Untitled, 1946–47, Yellow Composition, 1946–7; Berlin, Neue N.G., It's All Over The City, 1947), was informal, gestural, with the paint applied in layers by means of dripping and with scratching into the surface. This new development in art proved influential, earning him the praise of artists such as Georges Mathieu and critics such as Michel Tapié, who coined the term Art autre (the Other Art) to describe the new style.

Wols was noted for his etchings and for his use of stains (taches) of color dabbed onto the canvas (as exemplified by his painting Composition, c. 1950). His painted work contains figurative elements as well as free improvisations and abstract elements. Spontaneity and immediateness determine the creative work of Wols, who never underwent any formal artistic training. Randomness (initially inspired by the Surrealist psychic Automatism) plays an important role in his unstructured compositions. In later years Wols was particularly interested in the combination of powerful brushstrokes with a relief-like painted surface structure.

=== Influences ===
His inspiration to become an artist derived from the work of the artists Paul Klee, Otto Dix and George Grosz. His advisor Moholy-Nagy instructed him to pursue his artistic endeavours in Paris. His encounters with Jean-Paul Sartre and Simone de Beauvoir awakened a lively interest in the philosophy of Existentialism. In the late 1940s Sartre chose to promote his abstract art.

=== Drawings ===
When Wols got his photography equipment taken from him at Camp des Miles, he was still able to use paper to create art, and that is where a lot of his drawings come from. He used the human figure in many of his drawings, except they were distorted. These drawings seemed very much like they could come out of a dream. He created a lot of his work lying down and used people who were around him for his inspiration. Drawing tends to fall secondary to many of the other media; therefore, when Wols did an exhibit with his drawings, they were overlooked, and not a single piece was sold. Wols drawings were created so small that they invite very close looking.

== Writings ==
- Aphorismes de Wols, Amiens 1989 ISBN 978-3-8296-0439-0

=== Examples of paintings ===
- ''The Blue Phantom''
- Constructions hazardeuses
