= Heinrich Maria Davringhausen =

German painter (1894–1970)

- Born: 21 October 1894; Aachen, Kingdom of Prussia, German Empire
- Died: 13 December 1970 (aged 76); Nice, France
- Movement: New Objectivity

Heinrich Maria Davringhausen (21 October 1894 – 13 December 1970) was a German painter associated with the New Objectivity.

== Life ==
Davringhausen was born in Aachen. Mostly self-taught as a painter, he began as a sculptor, studying briefly at the Düsseldorf Academy of Arts before participating in a group exhibition at Alfred Flechtheim's gallery in 1914. He also traveled to Ascona with his friend the painter Carlo Mense that year. At this early stage his paintings were influenced by the expressionists, especially August Macke.

Having lost his left eye during his adolescence, Davringhausen was exempted from military service in World War I. From 1915 to 1918, he lived in Berlin where he became part of a group of left-wing artists that included Herwarth Walden and John Heartfield. In 1919 he had a solo exhibition at Hans Goltz' Galerie Neue Kunst in Munich, and exhibited in the first "Young Rhineland" exhibition in Düsseldorf. Davringhausen became a member of the "Novembergruppe" and gained some prominence among the artists representing a new tendency in German art of the postwar period. In 1925 he participated in the Neue Sachlichkeit (New Objectivity) exhibition in Mannheim which brought together many leading "post-expressionist" artists, including Grosz, Otto Dix, Max Beckmann, Alexander Kanoldt and Georg Schrimpf.

Davringhausen went into exile with the fall of the Weimar republic in 1933, first going to Mallorca, then to France. In Germany approximately 200 of his works were removed from public museums by the Nazis on the grounds that they were degenerate art. Prohibited from exhibiting, Davringhausen was interned in Cagnes-sur-Mer but fled to Côte D' Azur. In 1945 however he returned to Cagnes-sur-Mer, a suburb of Nice, where he remained for the rest of his life. He worked as an abstract painter under the name Henri Davring until his death in Nice in 1970.

A major work from Davringhausen's New Objectivity period is Der Schieber (The Black-Marketeer), a Magic realist painting of 1920–21, which is in the Kunstmuseum Düsseldorf im Ehrenhof. Painted in acidulous colors, it depicts a glowering businessman seated at his desk in a modern office suite that foreshortens dramatically behind him. Before him are a pen and a telephone—the tools by which a paper fortune is made—alongside an open box of cigars and a glass of wine that symbolize his social class. The office windows open onto a bleak scene of severely geometric skyscrapers, a style of building that did not yet exist in 1921. Although Davringhausen rarely presented social criticism in his work, in Der Schieber "the artist created the classic pictorial symbol of the period of inflation that was commencing".

Much of Davringhausen's work was deposited in 1989 in the Leopold Hoesch museum in Düren, which has subsequently organized several exhibitions of his pictures, above all those from the later period.

== See also ==
- List of German painters
