= Adolf Fleischmann =

German artist (1892–1968)

Adolf Richard Fleischmann (18 March 1892 – 28 January 1968) was a German abstract painter. His late work evolved into constructivism; he is considered a precursor of Op Art.

== Life ==
Fleischmann was born in Esslingen am Neckar, the third child of businessman, Wilhelm Adolf Fleischmann, and his wife Paulina Maria (born 18 March 1892 in Esslingen).

After graduation he studied from 1908 at the Kunstgewerbeschule in Stuttgart, and in 1911 moved to the Royal Academy of Arts, where he studied with Adolf Hoelzel and Robert Poetzelberger.

After a brief spell as a staff illustrator and painter in the Municipal Office of Health Care Exhibition, Stuttgart, and at the workshop on graphic art under Paul Hahn Fleischmann, in 1914 he was drafted into military service. The following year he was on the Eastern Front and so badly wounded, that he was discharged from military service.

Temporarily, he designed book covers for Deutsche Verlags-Anstalt, and the JB Metzler's Verlagsbuchhandlung, both in Stuttgart.

Through the intercession of his half-sister Louise Lotte Volger, who was employed as Moulageuse at the Cantonal Hospital of Zurich, in 1917 he received a job there. Fleischmann worked until July 1928 (with interruptions) as a scientific illustrator in Zurich. Many of the products manufactured by him in plaster casts are preserved and on display at the University Hospital of Zurich.

In 1921, Fleischmann participated in the exhibition of the New Munich Secession. Here he was particularly inspired by Franz Marc and other Expressionists. As a result, he drew expressionist paintings.

This was followed by work trips to Italy, Spain, Switzerland, Paris, but also in Germany (Berlin and Hamburg). In 1925, he was influenced by cubism. In 1928, he took part in the "Juryfreien" exhibitions in Stuttgart and Berlin, and again participated in the "New Secession", Munich.

From 1933 to 1936, he spent a long time in Mallorca and Paris. From 1936 to 1938, he traveled with Bertha Loof, through Italy and stayed mainly on Ischia. In July 1938, his son was born Dieter Loof, who died at the age of about four years.

Since he was now producing abstract painting, he avoided a possible confrontation with the National Socialist regime by moving to France. In Paris, he joined the "Équipe" group. In this way he met influential artists, such as Robert Delaunay and Albert Gleizes. There, he helped the Resistance against the German occupiers. By the end of the war, he lived in various places in southern France, especially in Graulhet, Tarn (department). Several times he was interned, then in camp, "Les Milles" in Aix-en-Provence, from which he managed to escape, in October 1940.

At the end of 1944, Adolf Fleischmann returned from his hideout in southern France back in liberated Paris, where he found a completely devastated studio, with only remnants of his paintings, the work of many years. He literally, "I experienced a nervous breakdown." But with the help of his French friends, he could soon begin his artistic work again, and get involved until his emigration to the U.S. in 1952, participated in exhibitions in Paris. Under the pressure of a violent anti-German feeling, he signed in the early postwar period works with the pseudonym Richard, his middle name. In the catalog of Realitéts Nouvelles No. 1, 1947, is a picture of him. He did not use the pseudonym of Richard in the United States.

At the end of the war and in the early postwar years had a brief first Fleischmann "geometric phase" in the sense of concrete art, which he resigned but was soon in favor of less stringent designs. He joined the group at Réalités nouvelles and moved to Paris for a few years. He earned his living with designs for posters, magazine titles, wallpaper and fabrics (such as towels for Dior).

In 1948, he married Elly Abendstern, and in the same year he had his first solo exhibition in the gallery Creuze in Paris.

In 1950, Fleischmann wrote again to the geometric shape, but less in terms of concrete art, but rather in the context of serial painting. He thus became an early precursor of Op Art. At the age of nearly 60 years he had developed his own distinctive style, characterized by rhythmic grouped narrow strips that are integrated into narrow angle. In 1951 he exhibited his latest works at the Galerie Colette Allendy. He was a member of American Abstract Artists.

Then he was offered better job opportunities in the U.S., he moved to New York in 1952. Here he lived both as a staff artist, at the College of Physicians and Surgeons of Columbia University, as well as a freelance painter. Solo exhibitions and experiments with cardboard and similar materials to accompany his New York time.

In 1958, he went on visits back to Europe for almost three months, and in this period also saw the subtle change in the severity of his geometric style in favor of looser lines, stripes and figurations. As before, he remained committed to the geometry, but his images were softer.

In 1962, he became seriously ill. During 1963 and 1964, he spent 16 months in Stuttgart. In this period the "Metamorphoses" images: the individual L-forms are pulled together as blocks.

Fleischmann went back to New York in late 1964, where he suffered a severe stroke in 1965. Because of improved medical treatment he returned to Stuttgart. There was held the 1966 Adolf Fleischmann-anniversary exhibition at the Württemberg Art Association, which made him famous overnight, and marked his breakthrough in Germany. In the next two years he created, despite a partial paralysis, twenty relief-like collages.

Fleischmann died on 28 January 1968 in Stuttgart, aged 75, of the after-effects of a stroke; he was buried at the Ebershaldenfriedhof in Esslingen.

== Legacy ==
In 1973, it was the first large-Adolf Fleischmann retrospectives at the Ulmer Museum, and in 1987 at the Westfälische Landesmuseum in Münster, and the Saarland Museum Modern Gallery. In 2009, a retrospective was held at the Staatsgalerie Stuttgart.

== See also ==
- List of German painters

== Sources ==
- Georg W. Költzsch (ed) Adolf Fleischmann, Katalog zur Retrospektive, Moderne Galerie des Saarland-Museums, Saarbrücken 1987, ISBN 3-925303-37-5
- Renate Deniz (ed) Vater gesucht - Maler gefunden..... Adolf R. Fleischmann, 2009, ISBN 978-3-00-028440-3
