= Salon des Réalités Nouvelles =

French abstract arts group

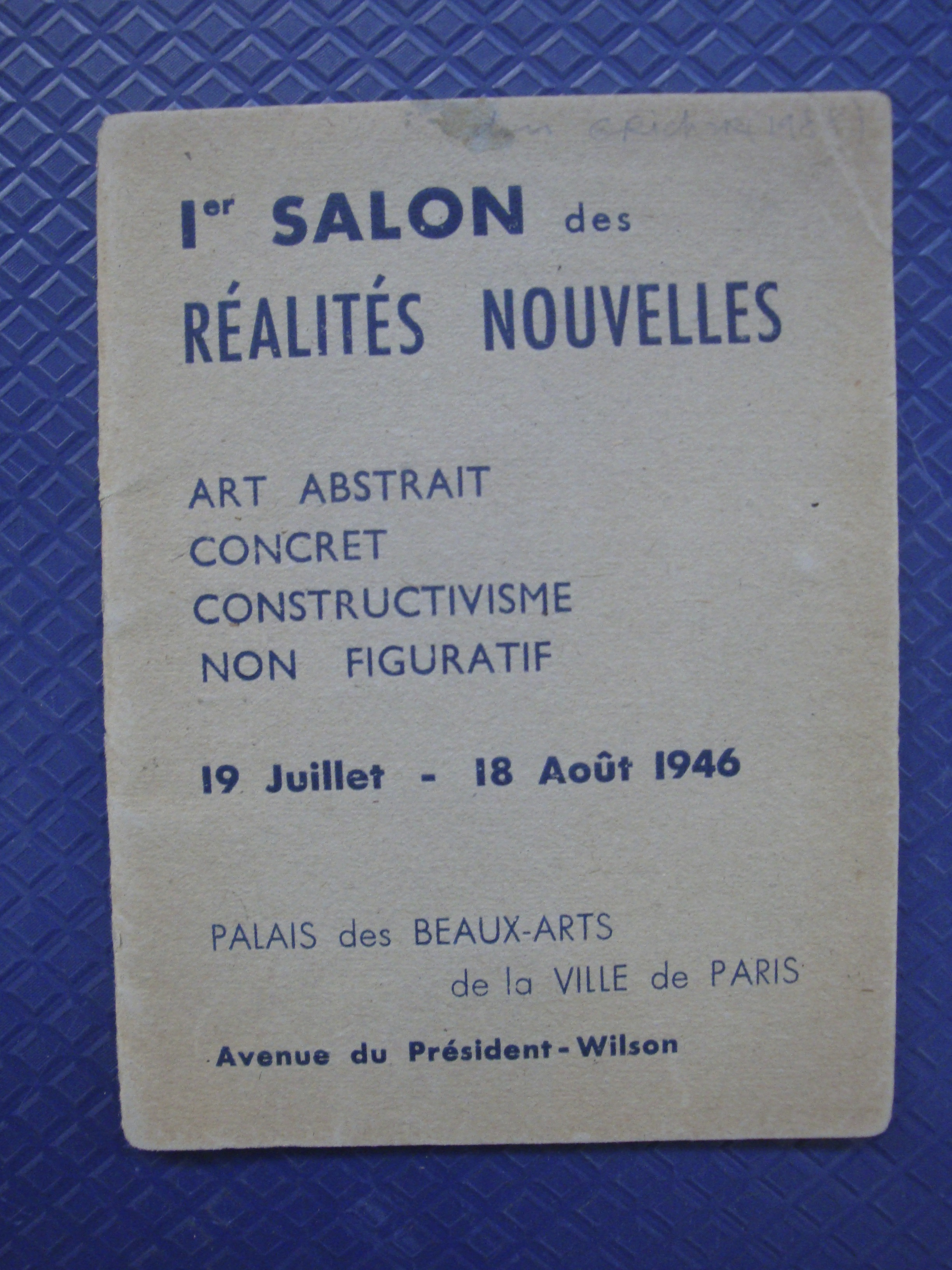
Cover of the group's first catalogue, 1946

The Salon des Réalités Nouvelles is an association of artists and an art exhibition in Paris, focusing on abstract art.

A first exhibition with the name was held in 1939 in Galerie Charpentier, organised by Robert Delaunay, Sonia Delaunay, Nelly van Doesburg and Fredo Sidès.

In 1946 the Salon was officially established as a successor to Abstraction-Création by Fredo Sidès, and its first board included Jean Arp, Sonia Delaunay and Albert Gleizes as members. Sidès was chairman until his death in 1953.

Over the years the exhibition has been held at several locations. From 2004 to 2020 it has been held at the Parc Floral de Paris in Vincennes, showing paintings, sculpture and photography by over 350 artists each year.

== Sources ==
- Baron, Stanley; Damase, Jacques (1995). Sonia Delaunay, The Life of an Artist. Harry N. Abrahams. ISBN 0-8109-3222-9.
- Robert Delaunay - Sonia Delaunay: Das Centre Pompidou zu Gast in Hamburg. Hamburger Kunsthalle. 1999. ISBN 3-7701-5216-6.
- Von Malewitsch bis Kabakov. Russische Avantgarde im 20. Jahrhundert. Prestel. 1993. ISBN 3-7913-1286-3.
