= Gloria Gómez-Sánchez =

Peruvian artist

- Gloria Benvenuto Reffray de Gómez-Sánchez
- Born: Gloria Benvenuto Reffray; 1921; Lima, Peru
- Died: 2007 (aged 85–86)
- Education: Private studio training with Ricardo Grau, Cristina Gálvez and Germán Suárez Vértiz (mid-1950s)
- Known for: Painting, installations, happenings, conceptual works
- Notable work: "Yllomomo" (1965, Galería Solisol) — muñecones and assemblages; "Ambientación y muñecones" (1966); *Sin Título* (conceptual text-piece, 1970)
- Style: Informalism; Pop art; Conceptual art; Neo-Dada / Matter painting
- Movement: Arte Nuevo (member, 1966–1968); Pop art; Informalism; Conceptual art
- Awards: Prize, Fundación para las Artes (Second Salón, 1967) — scholarship to travel to Argentina

Gloria Gómez-Sánchez (1921–2007), born Gloria Benvenuto Reffray de Gómez-Sánchez, was a Peruvian artist who formed part of the experimental scene in Lima during the late 1960s. Her practice moved through diverse trends and genres, including Pop art, informalism, happenings, and conceptual art.

== Career ==
Initially self-taught, she later continued her education though private classes in the studios of artists Ricardo Grau, Cristina Gálvez and Germán Suárez Vértiz, which she attended for a period of five years. Following this period, Gómez-Sánchez quickly began to experiment with non-traditional materials, such as sand and sawdust, to achieve innovative textures on the surfaces of her paintings.

== Artwork ==
=== Informalist period ===
The process of experimentation with diverse materials and processes is reflected in a series of informalist paintings presented in her first solo exhibition at the Instituto de Arte Contemporáneo (IAC) in Lima during April 1960. Gloria Gómez-Sánchez is credited with being the first artist to introduce the informalist pictorial style to Peru. The development of Informalism in Gómez-Sánchez' work would have taken place during her time in Buenos Aires between 1957 and 1958, and would have gained a clear momentum from 1959 on, when the artist was in contact with artists such as Alberto Greco, Argentinian Informalism's leading protagonist at that time.

Later, in her second solo exhibition, titled Yllomomo (Galería Solisol, 1965), this line of exploration becomes more radical in works with such titles as "La muerte de la pintura" [The death of painting] or "Funerales de un pincel" [Funerals for a paintbrush], both of which consisted of assemblages made from cheap ephemeral materials (plastics, wood, metal meshes and other discarded objects). These works reference a new conception of contemporary art, one in which the starting point is the waste left over from a consumerist society.

== New Art and Pop Art ==
Between 1966 and 1968, Gloria Gómez-Sánchez formed part of the Arte Nuevo group, together with Teresa Burga, Luis Arias Vera, Jaime Dávila, Víctor Delfín, Emilio Hernández Saavedra, José Tang, Armando Varela and Luis Zevallos Hetzel. This collective was composed of young artists who were influenced by the new trends in international art, such as Pop art, Op art and Conceptualism. They burst onto Lima's art scene with controversy, challenging the artistic conventions of the period, and with Fernando de Szyszlo as a leading figure in modern abstraction.

In the Arte Nuevo group's first exhibition, shown in 1966 at El Ombligo de Adán gallery, the artist presented the piece titled "Ambientación y muñecones," which was an environment composed of sculptures made from wire, gauze, paper and plaster —which she named "muñecones"—, presented in a space with tenuous lighting and accompanied by ambient sounds. According to art historian Alfonso Castrillón, the "muñecones" linked Gloria Gómez-Sánchez' work to Neo-Dada, due to their ephemeral nature and their aesthetic indifference.

Around 1967, as part of the individual exhibitions that the Cultura y Libertad gallery offered to the members of the Arte Nuevo group, the artist exhibited her work again, this time with a clear orientation towards Pop art. During this period she produced paintings and collages of female figures in entangled positions, in which she used high contrast and flat colors, as well as optical plays. She then continued her Pop Art aesthetic in a series of paintings and installations that were exhibited as Rojo, Amarillo y Azul (cuadros y objetos) [Red, Yellow and Blue (paintings and objects)] at the Fundación para las Artes gallery in Lima in 1968.

In November 1967, she won the prize at the Fundación para las Artes' second Salón, which led to her then receiving a grant to travel to Argentina. Upon her return to Peru in 1969, she participated in the collective exhibition titled Papel y más papel. 14 manipulaciones con papel periódico [Paper and more paper. 14 manipulations with newspaper], which was organized by theorist and critic Juan Acha, who invited 14 invited artists to produce ephemeral works with newspaper. The works were then destroyed at the end of the exhibit.

=== Movement towards Conceptualism ===
During the late 1970s, the artist decided to move away from gallery exhibitions with Sin Título [Untitled], a conceptual artwork that was presented at the Cultura y Libertad [Culture and Liberty] Gallery, which consisted of a text hung on the white wall of an otherwise empty gallery and read "El espacio de esta exposición es el de tu mente. Haz de tu vida la obra" [This exhibition's space is in your mind. Turn your life into the artwork]. The only other elements in the artwork were a white table on which white sheets of paper printed with a manifesto titled "¿Se acabó el arte?" [Is art over?].

¿Se acabó el arte?, ¿O es que el artista al fin se identifica (como al final de un psicoanálisis) y vive las cosas de su mundo directamente, sin dejar huella, sin dejar obra, la cual a fuerza de ponerse a tono con su tiempo se desintegra? Porque nuestro tiempo es hoy, ahora.

— Gloria Gómez-Sánchez

== Artwork Characteristics ==
Over the course of her artistic production, from the mid-1950s to 1970, Gloria Gómez-Sánchez experimented with a myriad of techniques, materials and styles. Art critic Luis Lama described her as one of the decade's toughest artists. Her exploration of Matter Painting and Informalism reflect her questioning of the plastic possibilities of painting. Subsequently, in her work influenced by Pop Art, the artist was more concerned with form, color, the lighting and optical and light effects of her work.

== Exhibitions ==
- 1960 – Informalismo, Instituto de Arte Contemporáneo, Lima
- 1965 – Gloria Gómez-Sánchez:Yllomomo, Galería Solisol, Lima.
- 1966 – Arte Nuevo, Galería El Ombligo de Adán, Lima.
- 1966 – Arte Nuevo, Galería Lirolay, Buenos Aires.
- 1966 – Contemporary Peruvian Paintings and Sculptures, Corcoran Gallery of Art, Washington DC.
- 1967 – Galería Cultura y Libertad, Lima.
- 1968 – Gloria Gómez-Sánchez: Rojo, amarillo y azul (cuadros y objetos), Fundación para las Artes, Lima.
- 1969 – Papel y más papel. 14 manipulaciones con papel periódico, Fundación para las Artes, Lima.
- 1970 – Galería Cultura y Libertad, Lima.
- 2014 – Gloria Gómez-Sánchez: Una década de mutaciones (1960–1970), Instituto Cultural Peruana Norteamericano, Lima.
- 2017 – Radical Women: Latin American Art, 1960–1985, UCLA Hammer Museum, Los Angeles.
- 2023, Action, Gesture, Paint: Women Artists and Global Abstraction 1940-1970, Whitechapel Gallery, London.
