= Jean Messagier =

French artist (1920–1999)

- Portrait photograph of the artist
- Born: 13 July 1920; Paris, France
- Died: 10 September 1999 (aged 79); Montbéliard, France
- Education: École nationale supérieure des arts décoratifs, Paris
- Known for: Painting, Drawing, Sculpture, Printmaking, Writing, Poetry
- Notable work: Nature morte (1944-45), Les Arroseurs (1947), Femmes aux Nasses (1947), Promeneurs (1947), Jeunes Filles à la Casacade (1949), Haute promenade (1954), Monstres d'été (1967), Le Sexe des vallées (1970)
- Movement: Post-Cubism, Lyrical abstraction, Tachisme, Nuagisme, art informel
- Awards: Chevalier de l’ordre national des arts et lettres, Chevalier de la légion d’honneur, Officier de l’ordre national des arts et lettres, Commandeur dans l’office national du mérite.

Jean Messagier (13 July 1920 – 10 September 1999) was a French painter, sculptor, printmaker and poet. Jean Messagier had his first solo exhibition in Paris at Galerie Arc-en-Ciel in 1947. From 1945 to 1949 the artist worked under the influence of Pablo Picasso, André Masson, Paul Klee and François Desnoyer, his professor at École nationale supérieure des arts décoratifs in Paris. Messagier again was revealed to the public at an exhibition organized by Charles Estienne at the Galerie de Babylone in 1952, entitled "La Nouvelle École de Paris" (The New School of Paris). The following year, Messagier deliberately broke away from his expressionistic form of Post-Cubism; his inspirations now focused on Jean Fautrier and Pierre Tal-Coat to develop a personal vision in which he renders "light...approached abstractly." Jean Messagier is often associated with Lyrical abstraction, Tachisme, Nuagisme, Art informel and paysagisme abstrait, though the artist himself had never accepted any labels, and had always refused the distinction between abstraction and figuration. From 1962 until the year of his death Jean Messagier exhibited in France and abroad, taking part in some major international events as a representative of new trends in French painting.

== Life and career ==
Jean Messagier spent his childhood during the 1920s and 1930s between Paris and Franche-Comté, where he realized his first representational watercolors and drawings (1940); portraits and landscapes. He first exhibited his works in a group show at the Salon des Moins de Trente Ans in Paris (1941), before participating regularly in Parisian salons: Salon des Moins de Trente Ans, Paris, 1941–51; Salon d'Automne, 1947–52; Salon de Mai, 1948–53; Jeune Gravure Contemporaine, 1950; Young Painters of the Ecole de Paris, Royal Scottish Academy, Edinburgh, 1952; Mostra dell'Incisione Francese Contemporanea, Milan, 1953; Galerie L'Étoile scellée and Galerie Craven, Paris, 1953. Messagier would soon be represented at group exhibitions in Germany, Zurich, Florence, Brussels, London and the Solomon R. Guggenheim Museum in New York. He would also participate in the Salon des Réalités Nouvelles, Salon Comparaisons, Peinture informelle (alongside Jean Fautrier, Hans Hartung, Jean-Paul Riopelle, Mark Tobey, Wols) and the Salon d’Octobre of which he was one of the founding members.

Jean Messagier, 1947, Untitled, oil on canvas, 80 x 130 cm (31.5 x 51.2 inches), private collection

Following his schooling at Large-Chênois in Montbeliard, Messagier moved to Paris. At l'Ecole Nationale des Arts Décoratifs in Paris, his professors included Roland Oudot, Maurice Brianchon, Raymond Legueult and François Desnoyer. In parallel he studied with the poet Paul Valéry at the Collège de France. In 1943, at the age of 23, Jean Messagier held his first solo exhibition at the Château de Montbéliard.

In 1944 Jean Messagier married the ceramicist Marcelle Baumann (also studying at Les Arts Déco). In 1947 Messagier realized his first sculptures, exhibited at the Salon d'Automne in Paris and held a solo exhibit at the Galerie Arc-en-Ciel in Paris. After brief stays in Italy and Algeria the two had their first child, Matthew (later to become a poet) in 1949. Messagier then showed at the Galerie de Babylone in 1952 entitled "La Nouvelle École de Paris" (The New School of Paris), organized by Charles Etienne, the art critic who would become the spokesman for the new lyrical and expressionist movement. Etienne recognized Messagier as a Robinson Crusoe of the Post-War movement.

Messagier co-founded the Salon d'Octobre in Paris and exhibited there in 1952 and 1953. In 1954 Marcelle gave birth to their second son, Thomas (who would become a taxidermist). At this time the family resided in the heart of Paris, 8 Rue Pierre et Marie Curie. In 1958 their third son, Simon, was born. By this time a new vocabulary had appeared in the press that described the new form of painting: art autre, art lyrique, tachiste, paysage abstrait, nouveau primitivisme, l'informel were the terms used. The gesture of painting itself became the creative act. Painting was no longer an activity oriented towards an aesthetic production. L'informel became the dominant expression of the times, not solely amongst the critics, poets and artists, but also among scientists and philosophers, such as Merleau-Ponty and Bachelard, and psychiatrists oriented toward phenomenology who used post-Freudian theory to speak of "paysage intérieur", the internal landscape of the personality. Painting (and drawing) for Messagier became the medium through which the universe spoke. Natural forms were observed and replaced by paintings within which the forces of nature could be experienced.

Jean Messagier, 1962, Juillet à Antennese, oil and mixed media on canvas, 140 x 210 cm (55 x 82.5 inches)

Between 1953 and 1956 Messagier refined his pictorial vocabulary to include a kind of symmetry, closer in spirit to W. Blake than to the constructivists. Defying the laws of gravity and seemingly outside of spacetime, his paintings of this period evoke a state of suspended animation, a dream-world as conceived by Mallarmé. Allusive and dissolved forms that he painted so far gave way to vast indeterminate stretches of monochrome color, expressing Messagier's unswerving commitment to nature, air and light. Over the years his gesture became further loosened, reaching its apogee during the 1960s with wide and elegant "gyrations". These works resemble a network of loops or clouds (nuages) wrapping and mingling together tirelessly.

For Messagier, an artist had to be a social actor. On July 13th, 1962, to inaugurate his new studio located in an old mill next to "les Trois cantons" at the foot of the Charrot bridge that spans the Doubs river, Messagier organized his first massive party lasting several days. Everyone from local government officials, artist friends from Paris (including the painters Bram van Velde, Serge Poliakoff and Pierre Alechinsky, the writer Samuel Beckett, the architect Jean-Louis Veret (student of Le Corbusier), well-known gallery owners, dealers, collectors and construction workers (in brief, the entire population of village) were invited. Jean Messagier renewed that spirit as much as he could.

In 1962, Jean Messagier represented France at the 31st Venice Biennale alongside Alfred Manessier, Serge Poliakoff, Andrew Marfaing and James Guitet (with Jean-Paul Riopelle representing Canada, Kumi Sugai Japan, Alberto Giacometti Switzerland, Jan Müller and Louise Nevelson the United States). The same year, Jean Messagier and Pierre Alechinsky, who first met in 1953, painted a canvas together embellished with phrases written by the art critic Charles Estienne.

Between 1963 and 1965 Messagier made grass sculptures, snow drawings and won a medal for his entry in Pour un été, La Monnaie de Paris. In 1964, he participated for the first time in the Pittsburgh International Exhibition of Contemporary Painting and Sculpture. One year later, in the 8th São Paulo Art Biennial, Messagier represented France along with four other artists. The following year Messagier created an annual shooting competition, and became a full member of the Comité National de la Gravure Française. In 1967 he participated again in the international exhibition in Pittsburgh.

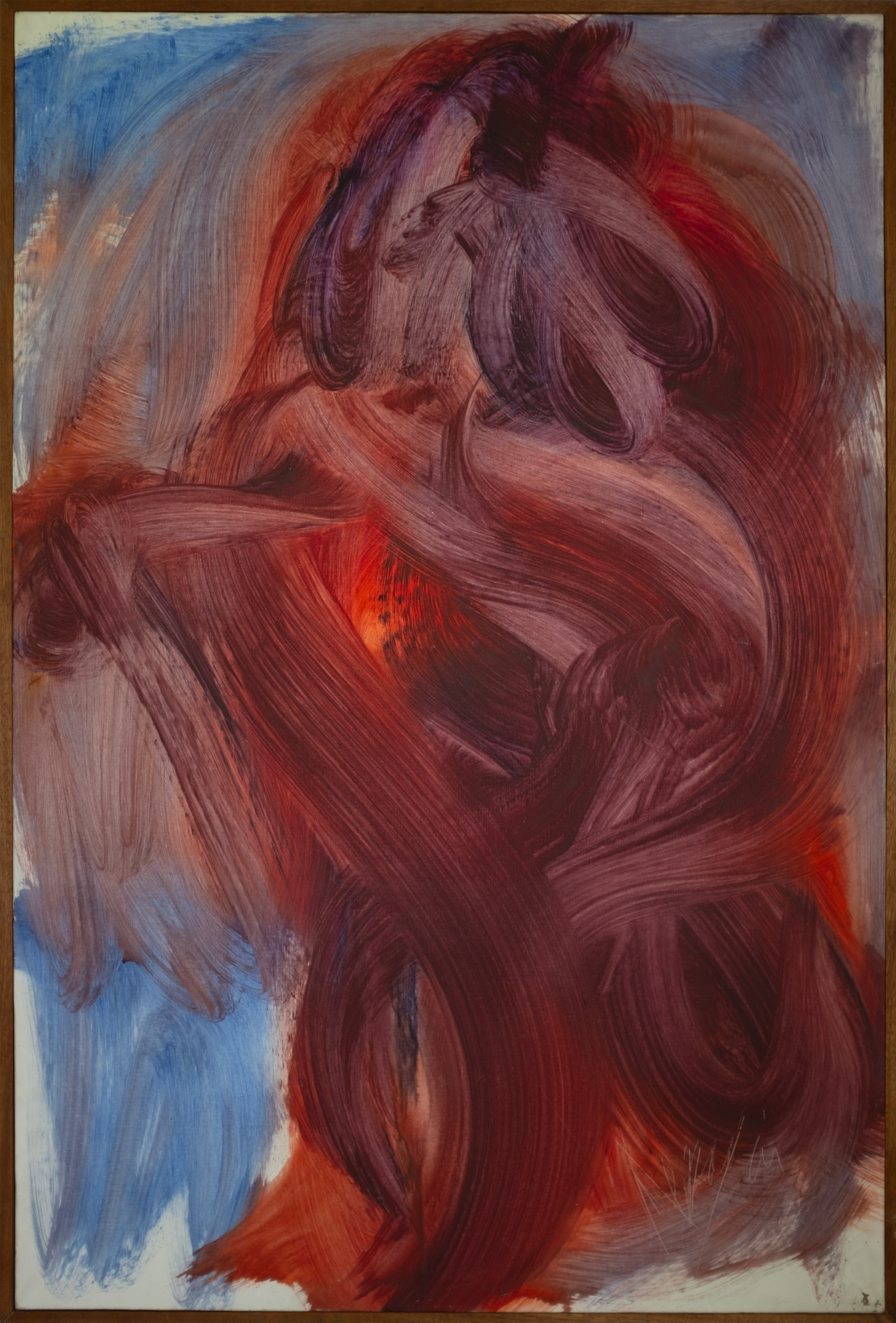
Jean Messagier 1966 Après-midi Louis XIV, 130 x 88 cm, private collection

and the release of a series of artistic postal stamps and co-created a fresco for the Salon de Mai in Paris. He was awarded Chevalier de l'Ordre des Arts et Lettres and in 1978 exhibited in the 7th Alexandria Biennale for Mediterranean Countries.

May 1968 in France introduced a partial return to representation in the work of Jean Messagier. His landscapes were reduced to a point where only a trace of gesture remained. This spontaneous passage would replace the depth of field, while the dynamic imprint of the brushstrokes, turbulent and interlacing, move across the canvas in vast convolutions. Titles, often inscribed directly into the painted surface, are a fundamental aspect of Messagier's paintings. The title becomes part of the work, opening the viewers imagination to the pleasure the artist wishes to share.

The term paysagisme abstrait (literally, abstract landscapism) could be reserved for a process where the artist senses and tries to capture the 'rhythms' of a landscape. This concept of rhythm is explicitly mentioned by a number of painters in addition to Messagier; Jean René Bazaine, Raoul Ubac and Zao Wou Ki. The rhythm of the landscape is experienced by the artist and expressed by the gesture; something the viewer in turn would experience as sensation. The landscape in this case is a direct source of inspiration. It must be felt.

During the winter of 1969 Messagier elaborated a technique he called "le Gel" in an effort to perfect a certain number of compositions whereby nature itself (e.g., temperature, hydrometry, condensation, and decomposition) would intervene in the creative process. These paintings were realized outside of his studio at the Moulin de Lougres between two streams, where the calm of the land was superimposed with the turbulent current of the water and air. For Messagier the process was equivalent to sculpting air, and the works became replicas of air itself influenced by liquid. Both solid and liquid would intermingle, one born from the other. His goal had been the reconciliation between art and life, between man and nature. Both abstraction and figuration could play a role. This was not the pitting of human nature against nature itself, but the fusion of the two. From the early 1950s Messagier had put into question the utility of debating the concepts of abstraction and figuration. Now both had been surpassed.

From the 1970s onwards, Messagier simultaneously evoked images from popular culture such as Goldorak, Marsupilami, Betty Boop, or famous figures like Lady Diana or Greta Garbo, and shamelessly shook up his masters by quoting Delacroix, Matisse, Picasso. These years 1970-80, where he painted the beautiful triviality of fried eggs, radishes, giant mille-feuilles and the poetry of poppies, daisies, frost, monotypes with direct impressions of leaves or lace on the other. In 1982, he painted the cover of a Jimi Hendrix album. After the experiments of the 1970s-80s, he would the turn in the 1988-90 to a new gesture, where broad brushstrokes and the fresh colors including glitters condense all the artist's energy.

== Legacy ==
Messagier, beyond abstraction and beyond figuration, had immersed himself in the world of life and nature. His gesture is life, his colors impressions and sensations of nature. His work was described by the critic Jean-Luc Daval as "the true nouvelle figuration." In response to Picasso's phrase "I do not search, I find", Messagier would scribbled a few years before the end of his life, "I do not find, I search." In this phrase, writes Alexandre Rolla, "Jean Messagier gives some clues as to the nature of the gesture", the stance he defended throughout his life, and observed throughout his oeuvre, "a winding path that should be explored today, to consider, finally, the importance of this work in the history of art."

== Selected works ==
- Nature morte (1944–45), private collection
- Les Arroseurs (1947), private collection
- Femmes aux Nasses (1947), private collection, Paris
- Promeneurs (1947), private collection
- Jeune Filles à la Casacade (1949), private collection
- La Rivière (1951), Dijon, Musée des beaux-arts
- Haute promenade (1954), Dijon, Musée des beaux-arts
- Plaine battante (1956), Grenoble, Musée de Grenoble
- Novembre cerné (1959), Vitry-sur-Seine, Musée d'art contemporain du Val-de-Marne
- Antichambre pour une plage (1960), Dijon, Musée des beaux-arts
- Mai à palier (1962), Vitry-sur-Seine, Musée d'art contemporain du Val-de-Marne
- Clef de mars (1963), private collection
- Sous les statues d'Italie (1963), Dijon, Musée des beaux-arts
- Théâtre des marionnettes (1963), Dijon, Musée des beaux-arts
- Paul Valéry (1965), Dijon, Musée des beaux-arts
- Louis XIV l'apres midi (1966), private collection
- Louis XIV (1966), Dijon, Musée des beaux-arts
- Aube à bijoux (1967), Dijon, Musée des beaux-arts
- Printemps du monde (1967), Dijon, Musée des beaux-arts
- Monstres d'été (1967), private collection
- Mesdemoiselles Printemps (1968), Marseille, Musée Cantini
- Le Sexe des vallées (1970), Dijon, Musée des beaux-arts
- Portrait de Kathleen et Pierre Granville (1973), Dijon, Musée des beaux-arts
- Projet pour onze penalties de gala (1975), Marseille, Musée Cantini
- Picasso aurait dû pêcher à Antibes avec les Marsupilamis et Betty Boop (1982), Antibes, Musée Picasso
- Waterloo à Java (1983), private collection
- Le grand équipage du Val-de-Marne (1986), Vitry-sur-Seine, Musée d'art contemporain du Val-de-Marne
- Les grands grillons (1990), private collection
- Enchevêtrements dirigés (1993), Musée d'art contemporain du Val-de-Marne

== Selected literature ==
- Jean Messagier: 31 juillet-8 août, 1943, Musée du Château de Montbéliard, 1943
- Solomon R. Guggenheim Museum, New York, Younger European painters: a selection, exhibition catalogue, 2 December 1953 - 21 February 1954
- Jean Messagier: 23 avril au 13 mai, 1954, Palais des beaux-arts (Brussels, Belgium), 1954
- Frank Elgar, Cercle Volney, Jean Messagier, Paris, 1955
- Charles Estienne, Catalogue de l'Exposition Jean Messagier, Peintures et aquarelles à la Galerie André Schoeller Jr., Paris, 1960
- Charles Estienne, Jean Messagier: Quinze années de peinture, oeuvres de 1947 a 1962, 8 au 30 novembre 1963, Galerie André Schoeller Jr., Galerie Bernheim-Jeune, Paris, 1963
- Jean Messagier, monotypes: 12 mars-11 avril 1964, Galerie Edwin Engelberts, Éditeur La Galerie, 1964
- Annette Michelson, Jean Messagier, Choix d'Estampes 1945-1966, Engèlberts, 1966
- Œuvres récentes de Jean Messagier: Galerie André Schoeller, Paris, novembre/décembre, Paris, 1967
- Jean Messagier: sculptures, 1948 - 1969, 23 avril - 17 mai 1969, Galerie Knoedler, Paris, 1969
- Pierre Cabanne, Jean Messagier, Éditions du Temps, 1969
- Danièle Giraudy, Cantini 69 [i.e. soixante-neuf]: naissance d'une collection, Numéro 2, Musée Cantini, 1969
- Jean Messagier: exposition, mai-juin 1973, Galerie Ariel, Paris 8e, Galerie Beno d'Incelli, Paris 8e, Editions Galerie Ariel, 1973
- Entretien de Jean Messagier avec Daniel Meiller et Patrick Le Nouene—Biographie, expositions, bibliographie. ISBN 2700400089
- Messagier, Putman, Alpers, Nouene, Messagier, les estampes et les sculptures: 1945-1974, Arts et métiers graphiques, Y. Rivière, 1975
- Les dévelofixers: exposition, Jean Messagier, Fondation Claude-Nicolas Ledoux, 1976
- Jean Messagier: parcours d'un peintre de 1949 à 1979, Musée Granet (Aix-en-Provence, Bouches-du-Rhône), 25 juillet-30 septembre 1980, Maison de la culture d'Amiens, Centre national de recherche, d'animation et de création pour les arts plastiques (Le Creusot, Saône-et-Loire), 1979
- Jean Messagier, Roger Meier, Anne Cuneo, André Ramseyer, Editions de la Prévôté, 1979
- Galeries nationales du Grand Palais, Jean Messagier: Galeries Nationales du Grand Palais, Paris, 13 novembre 1981 - 11 janvier 1982
- Jean Messagier: Musée Despiau-Wlérick et Dubalen (Mont-de-Marsan), exposition, juin-août 1983
- École du Louvre, Image et signification, Documentation française, 1983, pp. 275–280
- Jean Messagier, Feuilles de mille-feuilles, Fata Morgana, 1984
- Jean Messagier à St-Ursanne, 16 juin au 18 août 1984, diffusion Société jurassienne d'émulation, 1984
- Ante Glibota, Jean Messagier: bourgeons de papier, croquis 1940-1985, Editions galerie d'art international, 1985
- Jean Messagier: oeuvres choisies entre 1945-1985, Exposition, Musée d'Art Contemporain, Dunkerque, 1985
- Jean Messagier au Musée de Brou: Bourg en Bresse, 5 octobre-17 novembre 1985
- Traces de visites, C. Tchirakadzé, Evelyne Salmon, Jean Messagier, Musée du Château de Montbeliard, 1986
- Le grand cortège de Jean Messagier: installations thermoformées et lieux créés par Jean Messagier, Ministère de la Culture, Direction des Musée de France, Association générale des conservateurs des collections publiques de France, Association des Conservateurs de Franche-Comté Paris Art Center, 1987
- Jean de Bengy, Jean-Michel Alberola, François Mitterrand, Comme un coursier indompté, Jean-Michel Alberola, Pierre Alechinsky, Gilles Aillaud, Avigdor Arikha, Jean-Charles Blais, Pierre Buraglio, Jean Messagier, Rouan, Dominique Bozo, Jean-Michel Foray, Centre national des arts plastiques, 1989
- Jean Messagier, Le Grand défroissement, Fata Morgana, 1989
- Jean Messagier: 1947-1990, du 16 Juin au 16 Septembre 1990, Musée Toulouse-Lautrec, 1990, ISBN 2901284205, 9782901284208
- Messagier à la Galerie Katia Granoff, Édition Katia Granoff (Paris), 1990
- Jean Messagier, Météores quotidiens, Fata Morgana, 1992
- Cimaise, Volume 41, Numéros 228 à 233, 1994
- Jean Messagier, Edition Arts et dialogues européens, 1995
- Jean Messagier, Le gel, 1995
- Jean Messagier: magicien d'imaginaires, expositions, Saline Royale d'Arc-et-Senans, 15 mai-3 août 1997, Musée Gustave Courbet, Ornans, 7 juin-31 octobre 1997, Jean-Jacques Fernier, Musée Gustave Courbet Ornans, Doubs, Fondation Claude-Nicolas Ledoux, 1997
- Messagier, Estampes: Exposition Au Musee de Gravelines, 30 Novembre 1997 au 1er Fevrier 1998, Musée de Gravelines, 1997
- Jean Messagier, Tous les pollens du monde, Volume 38 de L'Art en écrit, Éditeur Jannink, 1998, ISBN 2902462514, 9782902462513
- Matthieu Messagier, Jean Messagier, oeuvres graphiques: (1943 - 1998); Musée Baron Martin de Gray, du 16 juin au 11 septembre 2000
- Jean Messagier, 1920-1999: portes pour une joie, Musée Paul Valéry (Sète, Hérault), 2004
- Jean Messagier: la nature au creux de la main, Montbéliard (Doubs), Musée du Château (Montbéliard), Musée d'art et d'histoire (Belfort), ADAGP, 2006
- Francette Messagier, Jean Messagier: traces, Néo éditions, 2006, ISBN 2914741324, 9782914741323
- Nouvelles de l'Estampe, Numéros 203 à 208, Comité national de la gravure française, Bibliothèque nationale (France). Cabinet des estampes, 2006, pp. 61–64
- Richard Leydier, Alain Jouffroy, Jean Messagier, Le Cercle d'art contemporain, Cercle d'Art, 2007, ISBN 2702208053, 9782702208052
