= Pignataro =

Pignataro may refer to:

- Pignataro Interamna, in the Province of Frosinone, Lazio, Italy
- Pignataro Maggiore, in the Province of Caserta, Campania, Italy
- Roberto L. Pignataro (1928-2008), Argentine abstract artist
