= Modin =

Modin may refer to:

== People ==
- Fredrik Modin (born 1974), Swedish ice hockey player
- Jesper Modin (born 1988), Swedish cross-country skier
- Mauro Modin (born 1963), Italian painter
- Rodolphe Modin (born 1959), French former international rugby union player
- Yuri Modin (1922–2007), Russian KGB spy
- Zebastian Modin (born 1994), Swedish cross-country skier, biathlete, and Paralympian

== Places ==
- Modi'in-Maccabim-Re'ut, a town in Israel referred to in the Bible as Modin
- Camp Modin, a Jewish summer camp in New England

== Other uses ==
- Movimiento por la Dignidad y la Independencia, former Argentine political party, shortened as "MODIN"
