= Joan Vilacasas =

Catalan painter, engraver, ceramist, writer and collector

- Born: 30 June 1920; Sabadell
- Died: 17 January 2007 (aged 86); Barcelona
- Other names: Joan Vila i Casas
- Occupation: Artist

Joan Vila i Casas, known as Joan Vilacasas (Sabadell, 3 June 1920 - Barcelona, 17 January 2007) was a Catalan painter, engraver, ceramist, writer and collector. Vilacasas is one of the key names of the Catalan informalist generation. Like many other artists of the moment, in 1949, he embarked on his way to Paris in search of his own language that could overcome the devastating panorama and the impoverishing isolation suffered during Francoism period in Spain. Once there, and after connecting with the artists of the international artistic avant-garde, he began a progressive change in his work, first strongly influenced by impressionists and cubists, and then progressed towards abstract art.
