= Requena Nozal =

Spanish painter

José Requena Nozal
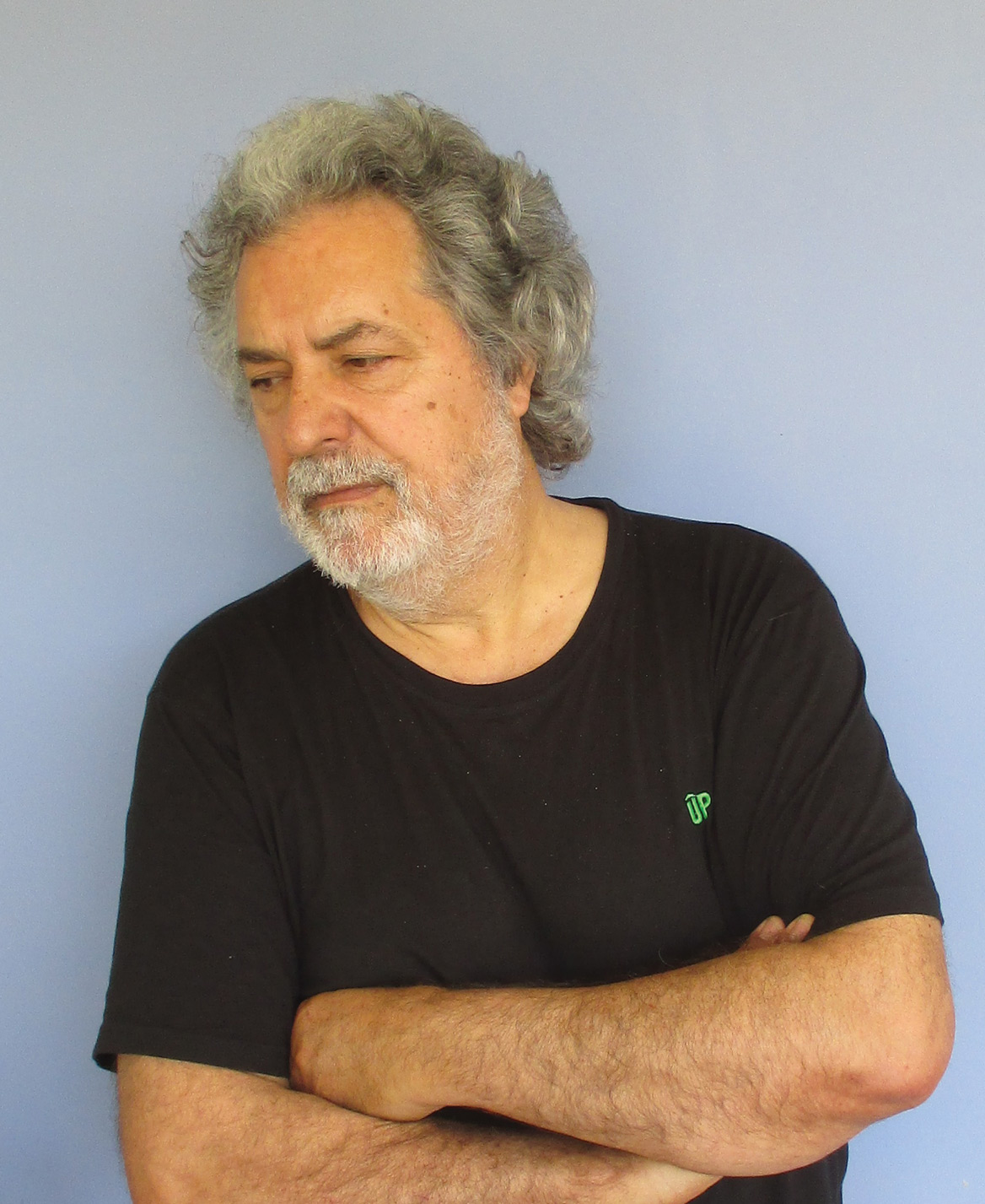
- Requena Nozal in April 2015
- Born: October 25, 1947 (age 78); Zaragoza Spain
- Known for: Painting, Encaustic, Sculpture
- Movement: Abstract art and Tachisme
- Spouse: Concepcion Barraqueta Egea

Signature
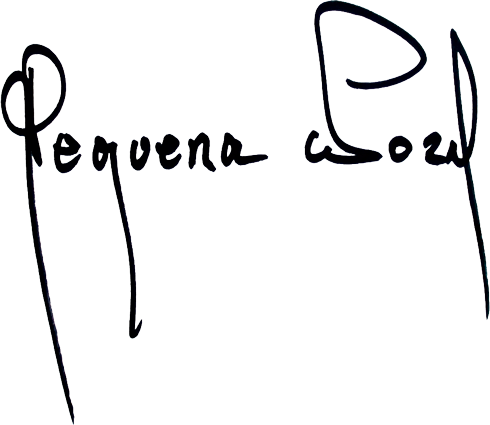
- Website: www.requenanozal.com

José Requena Nozal (October 25, 1947, Zaragoza, Spain) is a self-taught artist-painter who uses different techniques (encaustic, oils, acrylics and pastels). His works are scattered both Spain, Europe and the United States. He has held various exhibitions open both to the public and also to specialised art critics.

== Biography ==
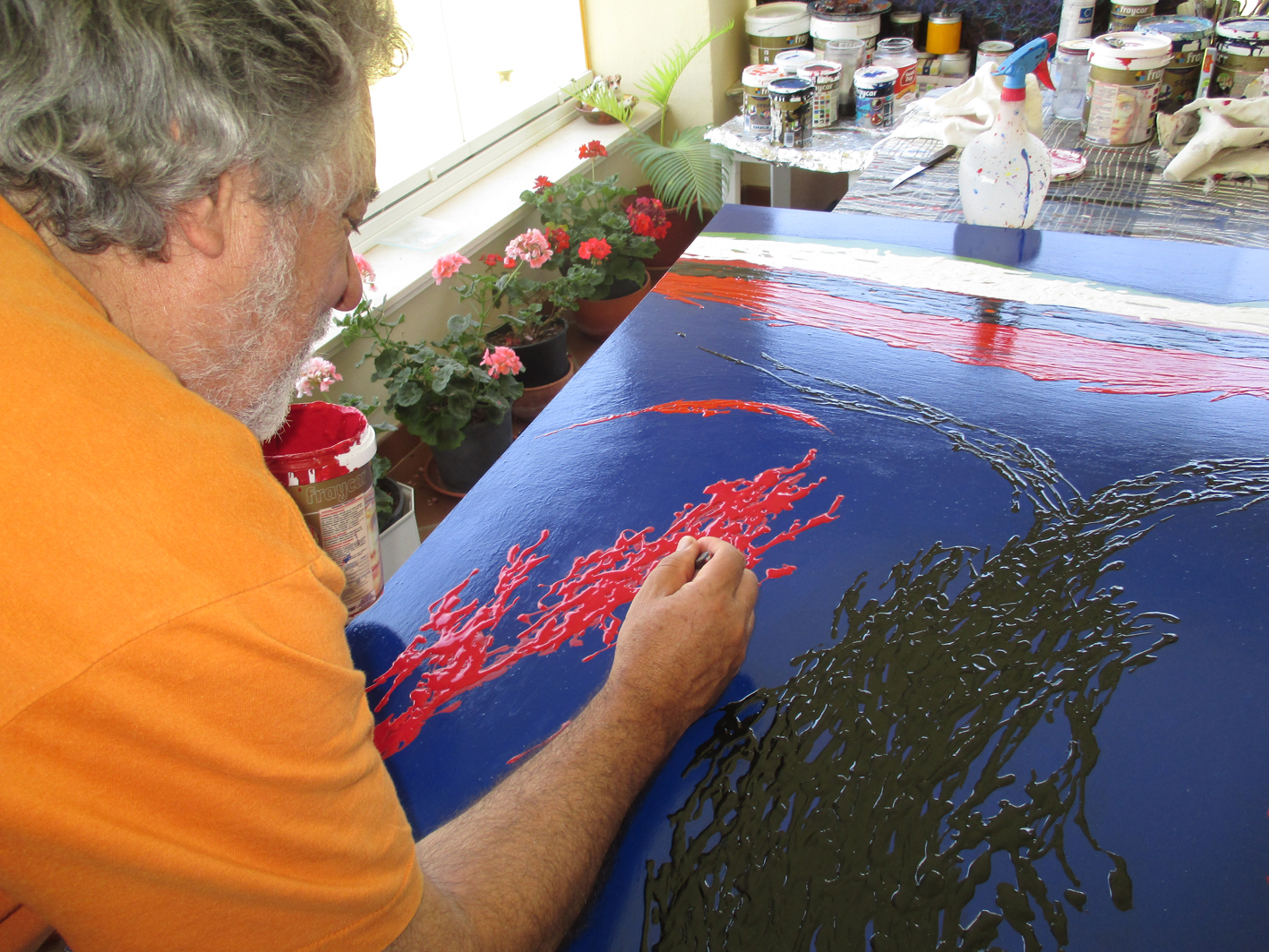
Requena Nozal working on one of his works (2015)

He was born in the district of El Arrabal, in the city of Zaragoza on October 25, 1947.

His first solo exhibition took place in 1975 at the Provincial Museum of La Rioja, which unveiled his figurative works of marginal themes and oil technique.

In 1982 he participated in the "National Painting Contest for Young Artists" organised by the newspaper ABC, in its "VII Black and White Painting Prize" edition.

In 1996 he was awarded first prize of the "II Summer Salon of New York City" by the Goya Art Gallery in New York. As he was unable to attend the awards ceremony, the prize was collected on his behalf by Luis Hernández del Pozo, curator of the Salon.

Since 1997 he is member of the Spanish Association of Painters and Sculptors, with membership number 2,753.

In 2016 the City of Dénia sponsors the retrospective exhibition entitled "Hemeroskopeion 1980-2015" at the Centre d'Art l'Estació.

== Technique ==
Parts of his works are dedicated to encaustic art in which he "voluntarily seeks ambitious compositions and orderly crowds." In his work he has gathered a "variety of atmospheres (...) and a committed sense of humanity, a certain lyricism, where reality and an interest for expressing a particular emotion go hand in hand."

From 2004 he radically changes his style towards abstract expressionism or tachism, where he uses encaustic, acrylic and gold leaf in his works.

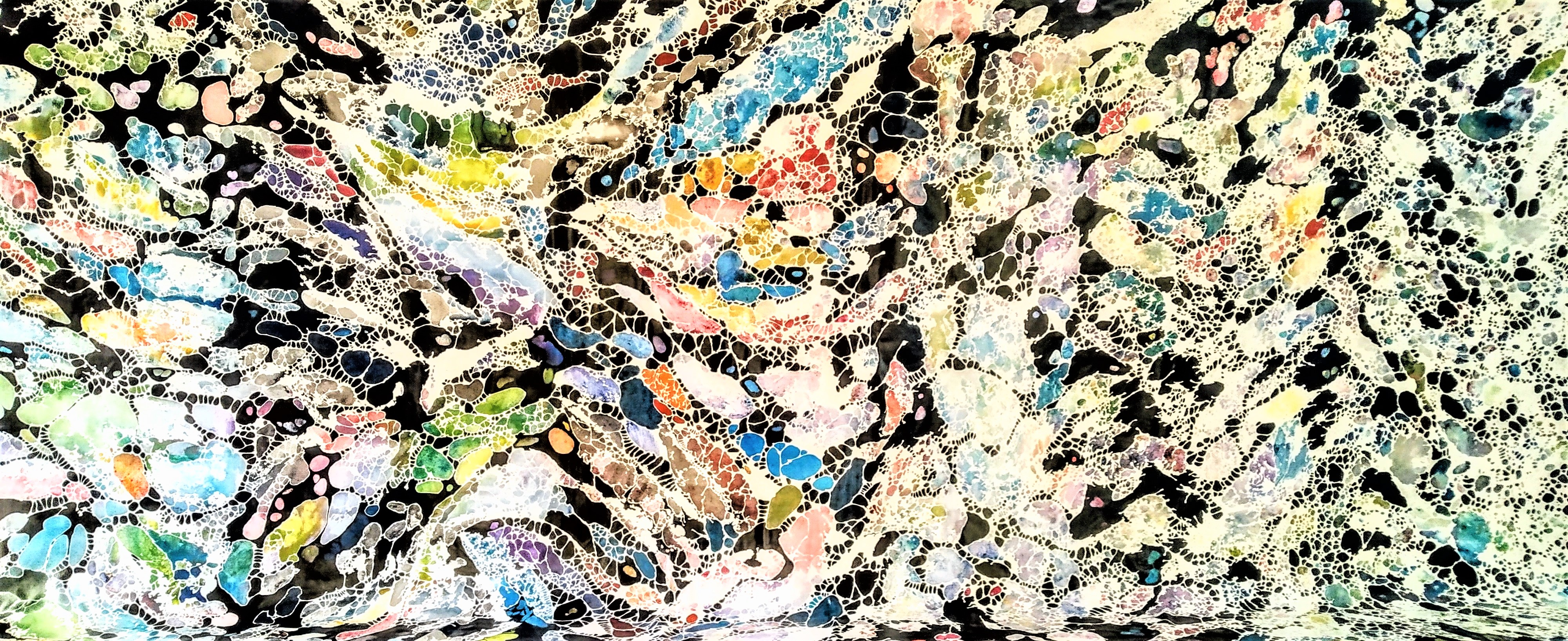
El laberinto de la memoria - [Acrylic on canvas] 2018 (630x270)

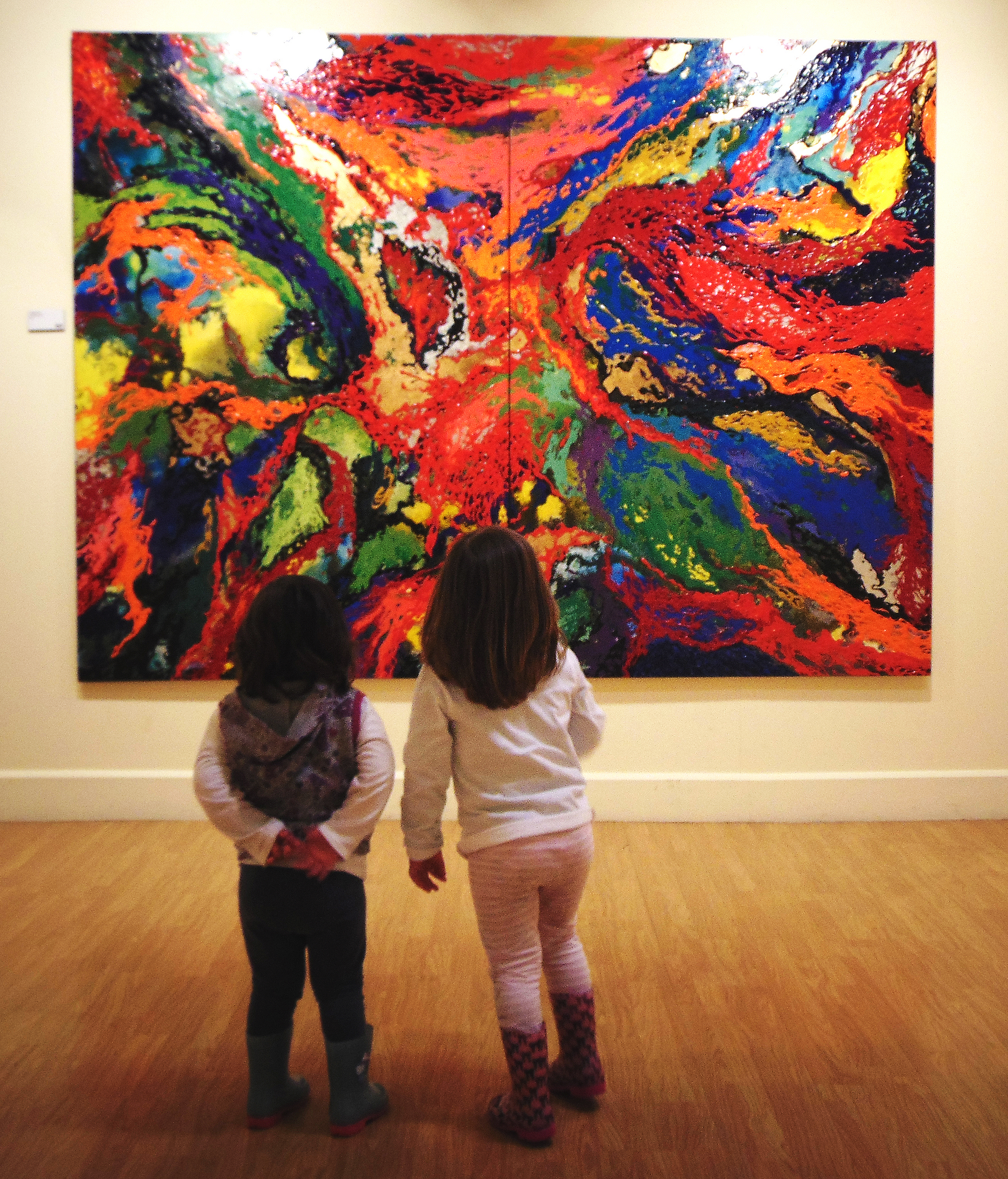
Girls watching Yellowstone painting (2016)

== Gallery ==
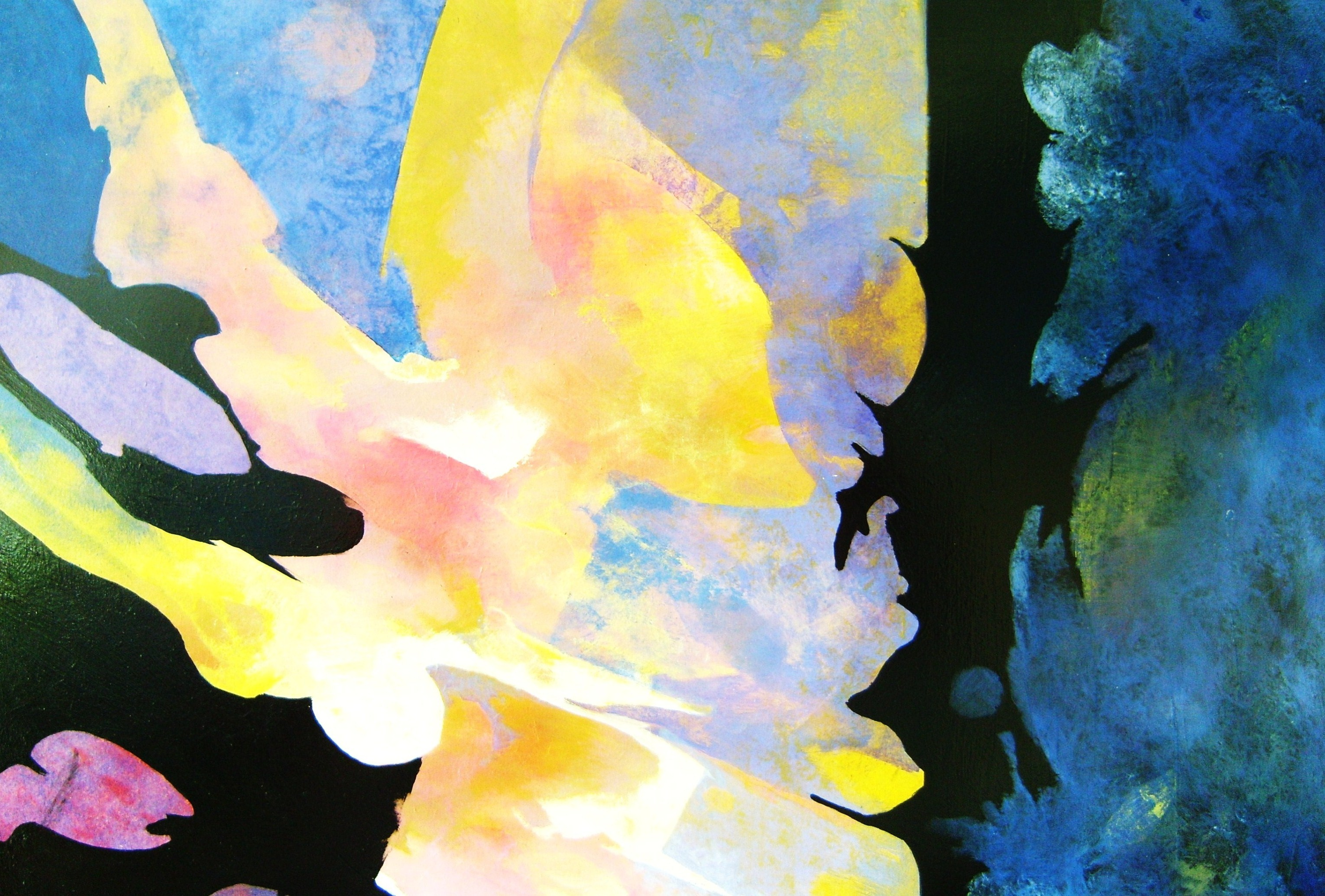
Celeste I [Acrílico sobre tablex] 2006 (70x50)

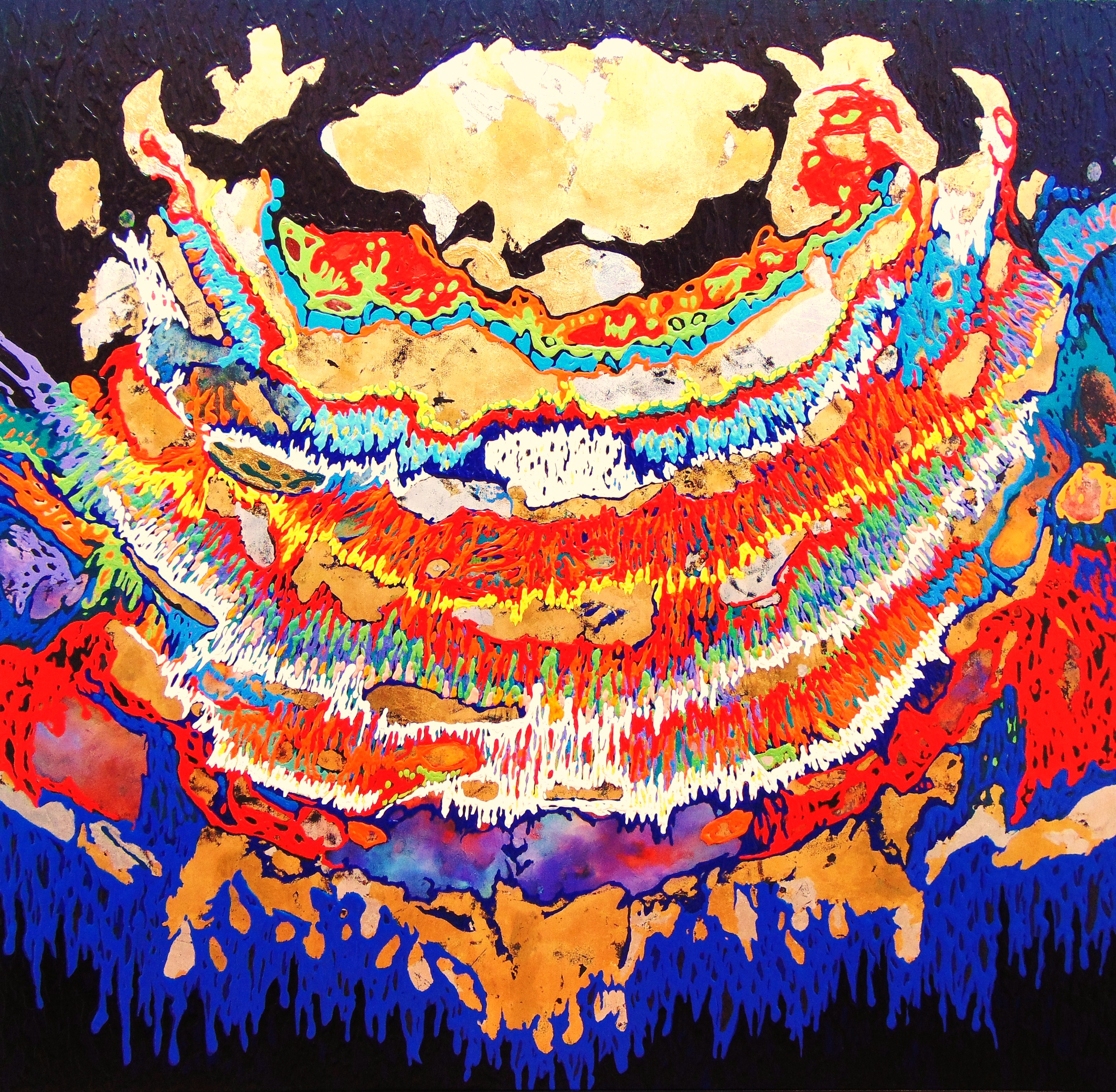
Collar egipcio [Acrílico y pan de oro sobre tablex] 2015 (122x118)

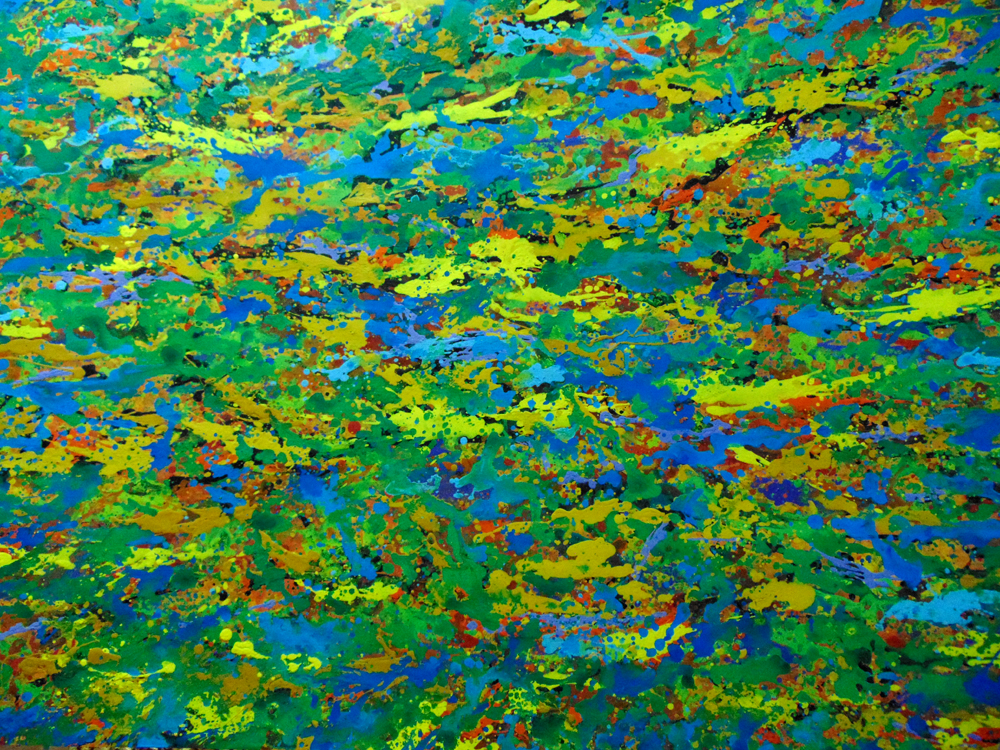
Homenaje a Gora [Acrílico sobre papel y tablex] 2014 (100x70)

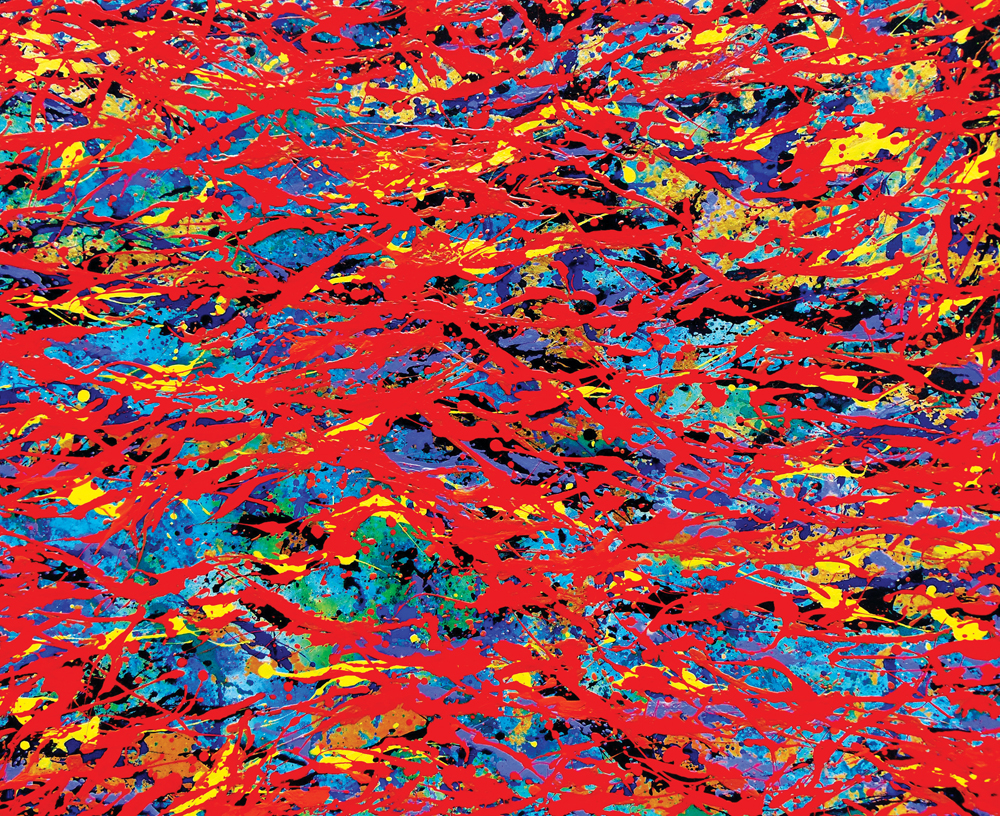
Hatshepsut II [Acrílico y pan de oro sobre tablex] 2015 (120x100)

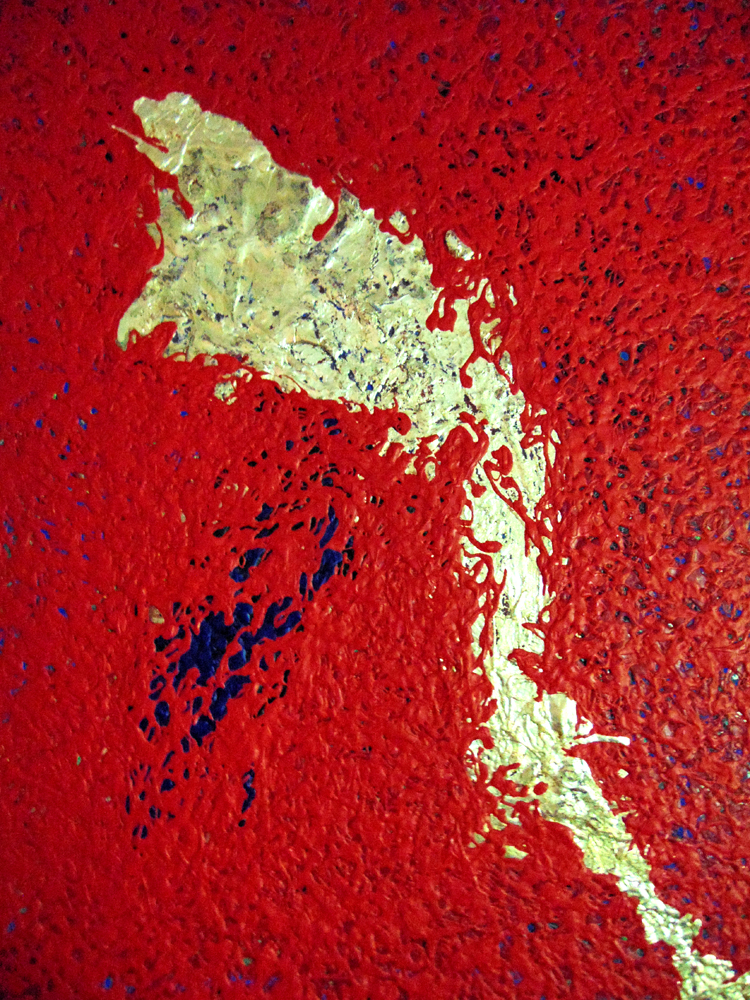
Lago Dorado [Acrílico y pan de oro] 2015 (122x100)

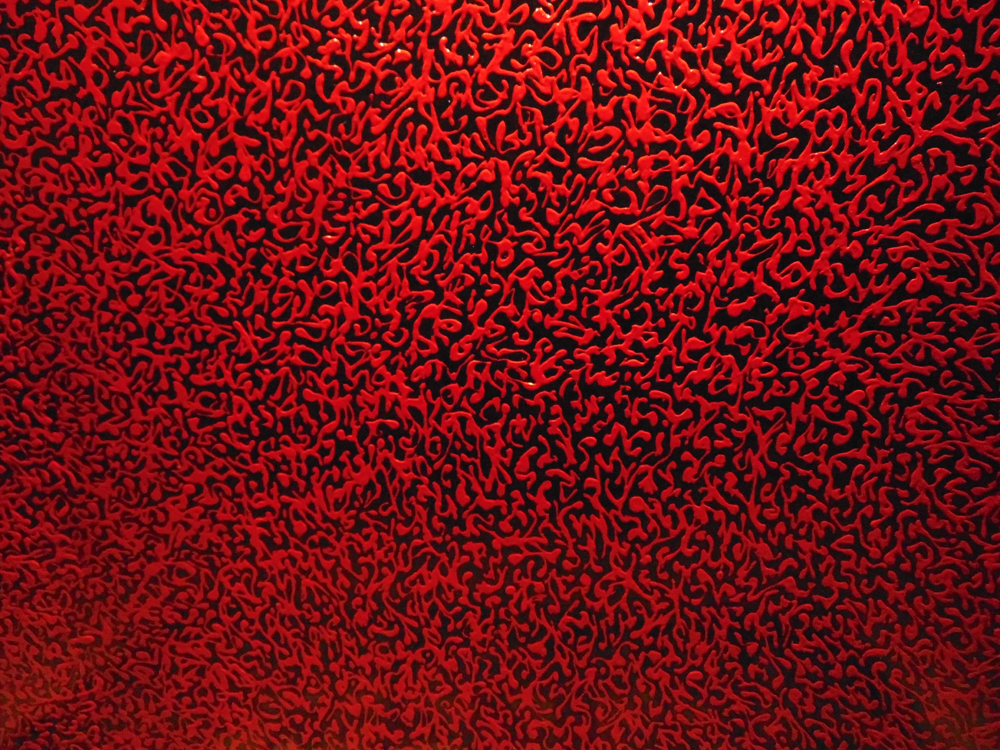
Dianium 7 [Acrílico sobre lienzo] 2015 (195x130)

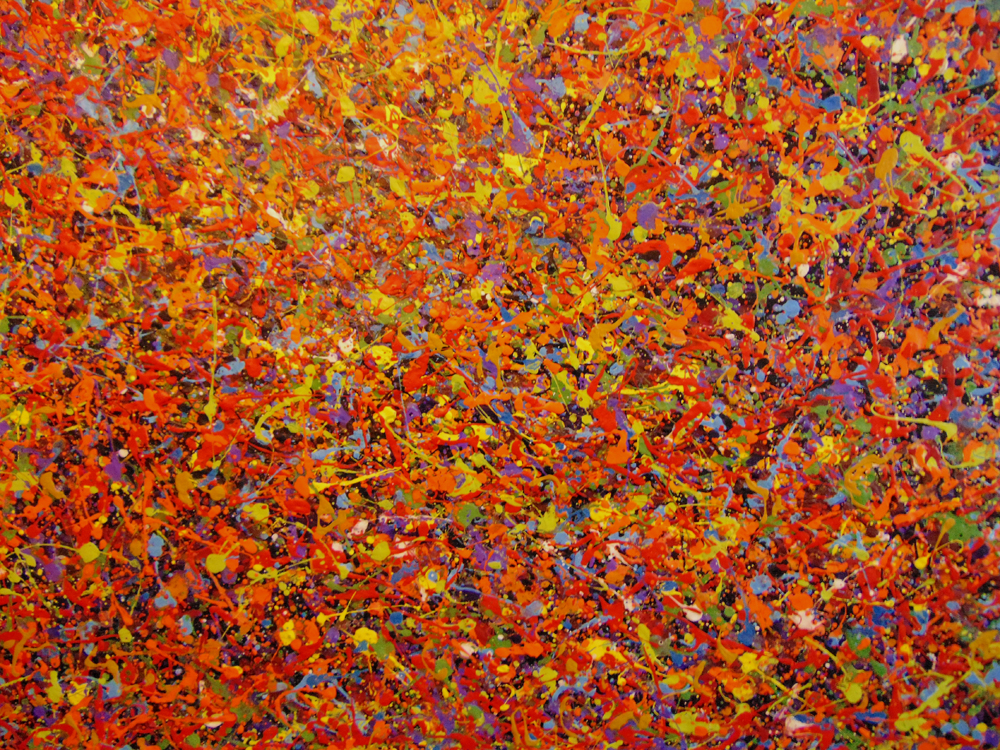
Dianium 16 [Acrílico sobre papel y tablex] 2015 (100x70)

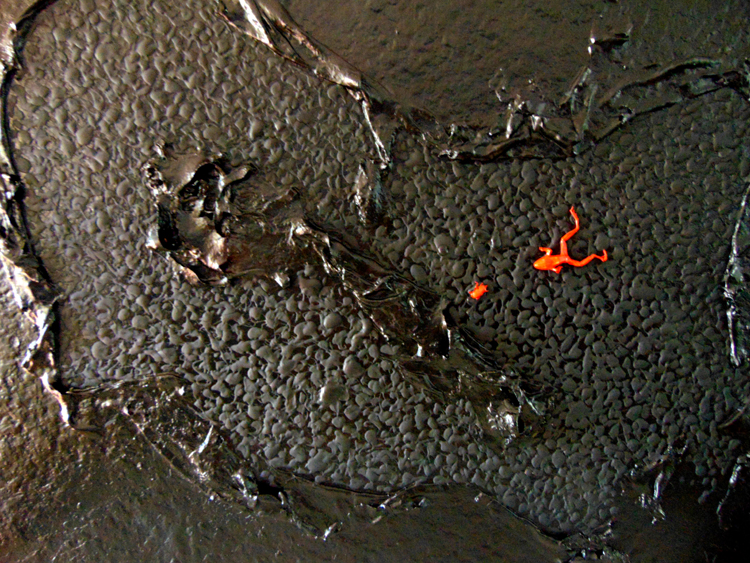
El fin es el fin [Técnica mixta sobre lienzo] 2016 (122x100)

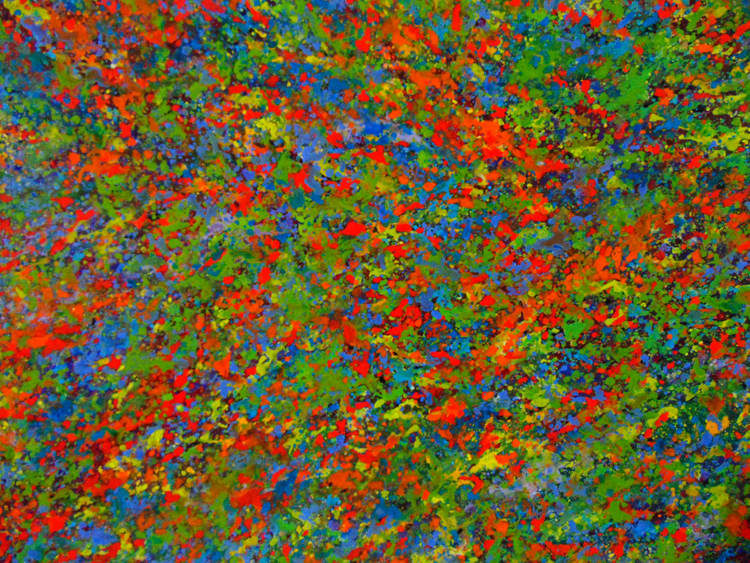
Murano IV [Acrílico sobre lienzo] 2016 (122x100)

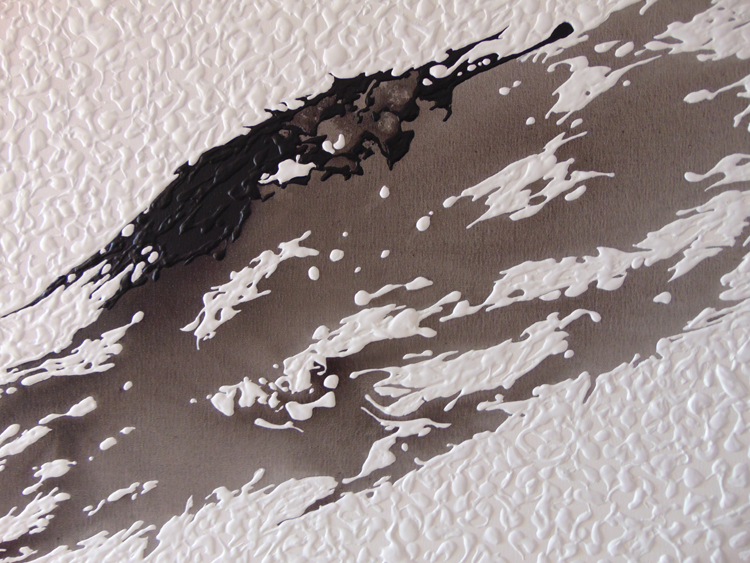
Sin Título [Acrílico sobre lienzo] 2016 (100x70)

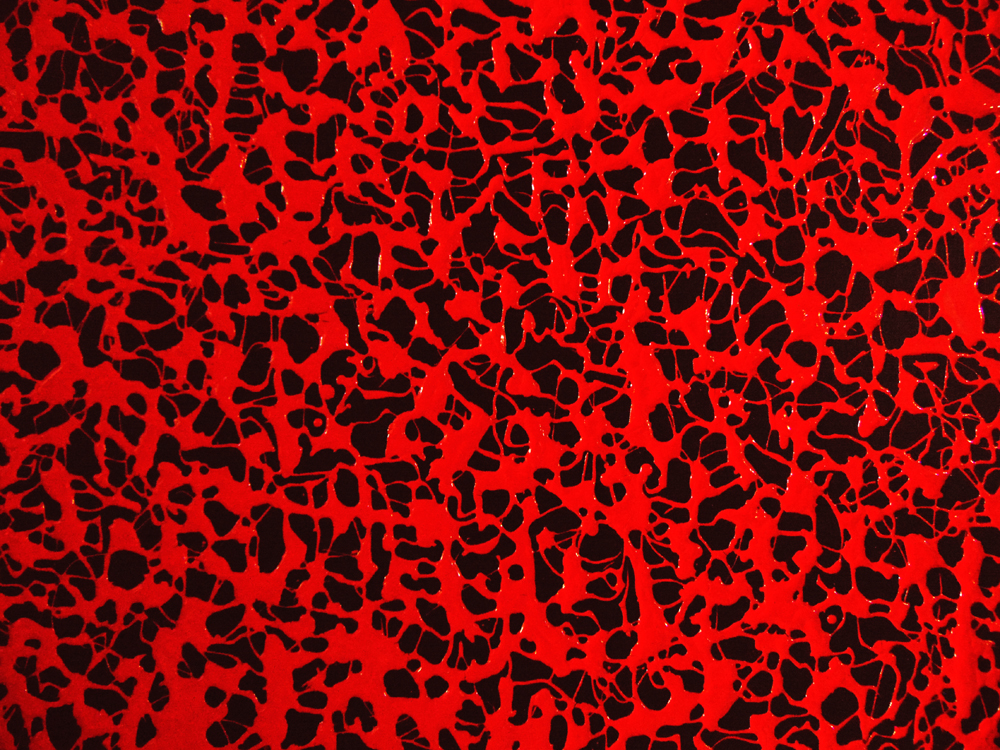
Serie Micra [Acrílico sobre bastidor] 2016 (50x50)

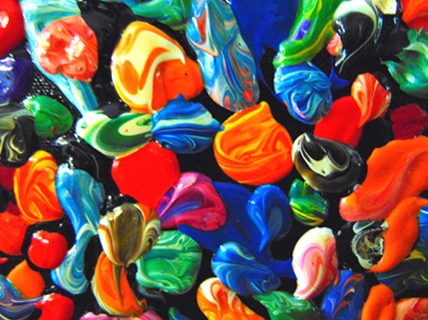
Fragmento Murano

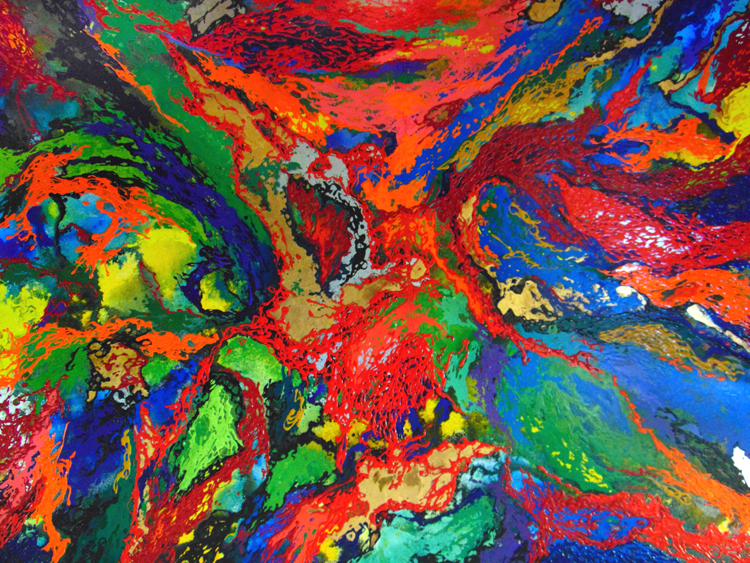
Yellowstone [Acrílico y pan de oro sobre lienzo] 2015 (260x195)

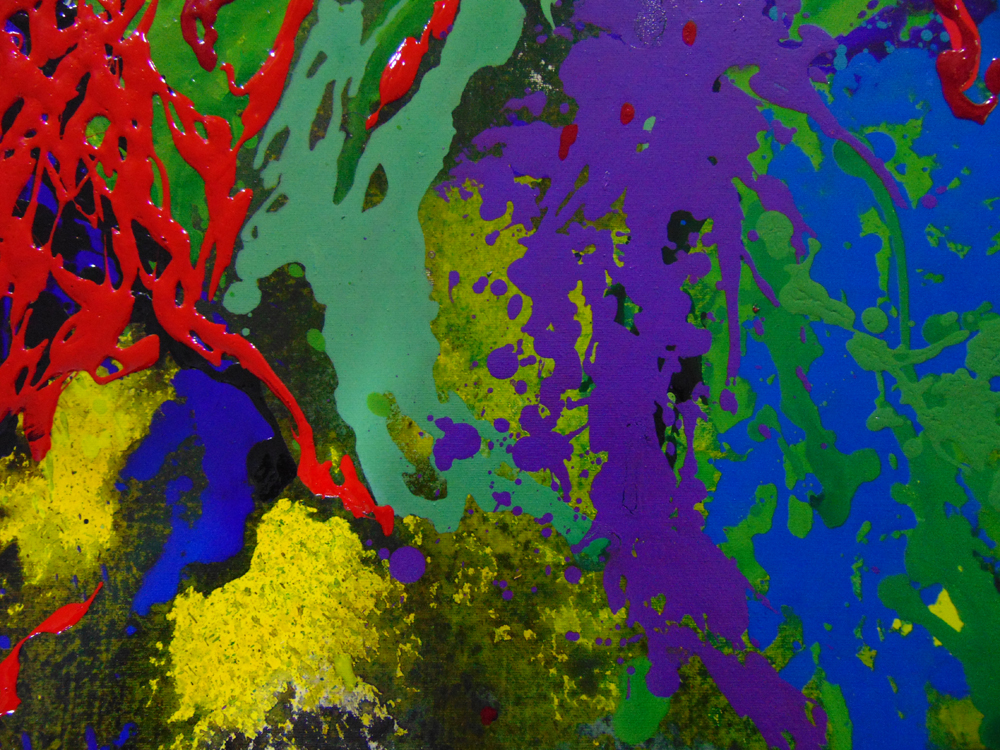
Fragmento de la obra Yellowstone (2015)

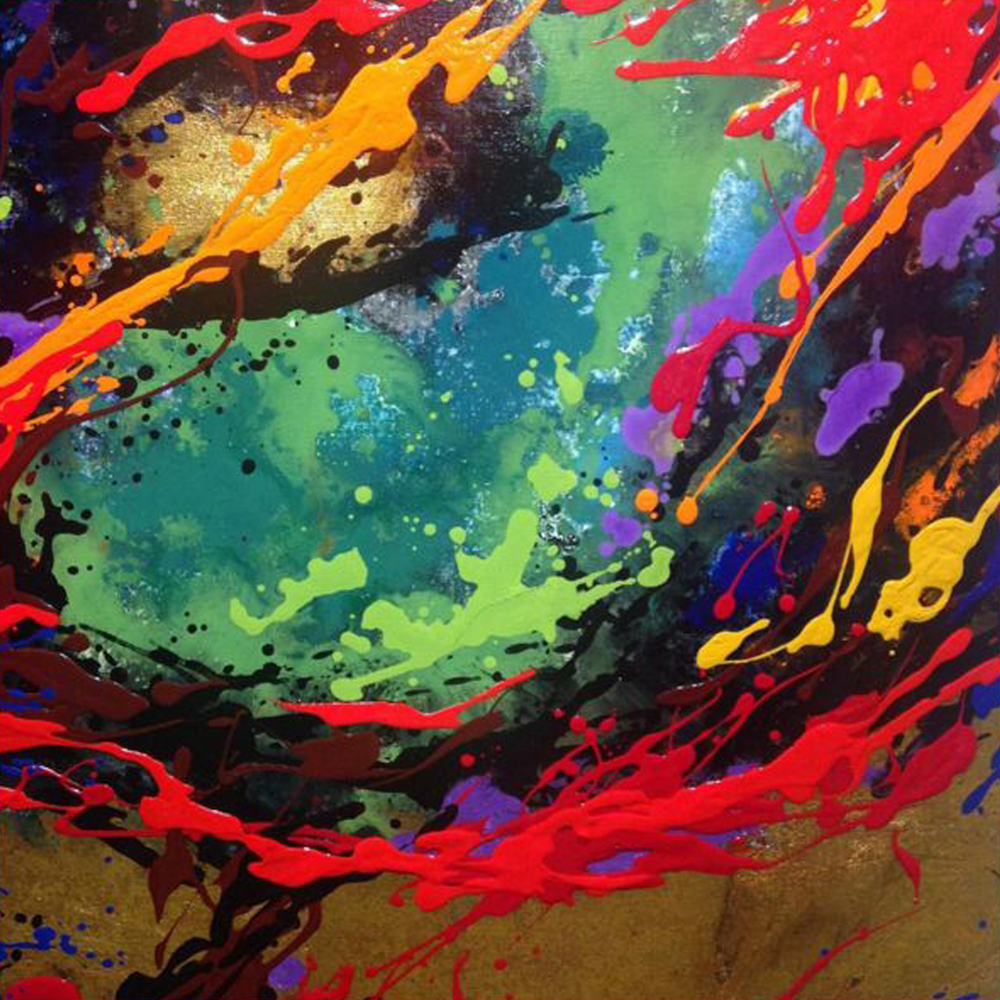
Fragmento de la obra Yellowstone (2015)

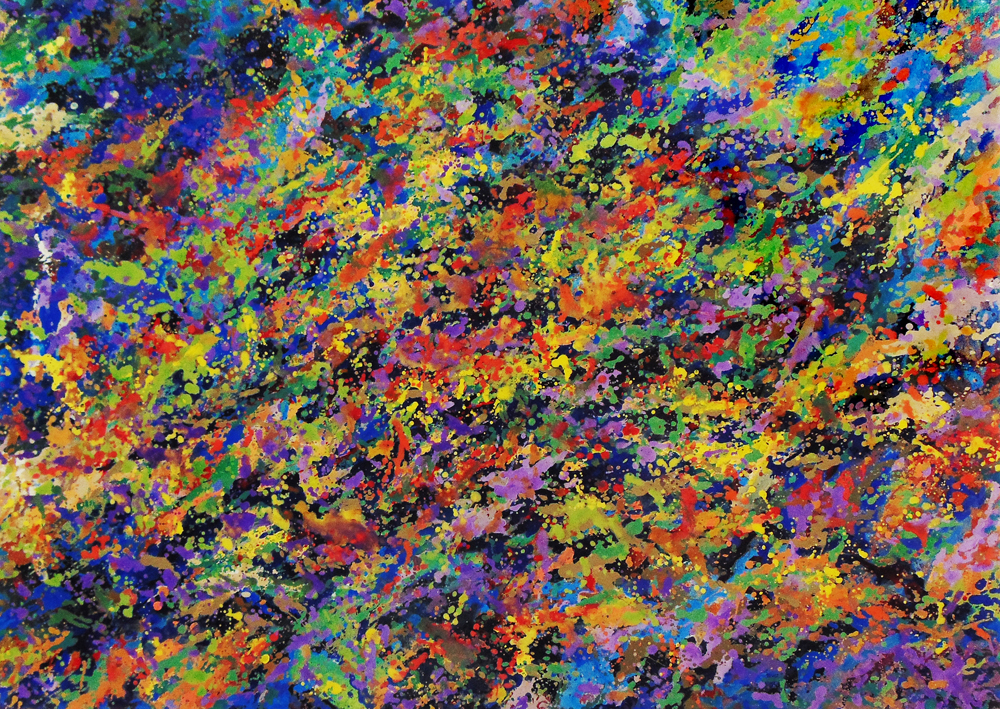
Recuerdo a Ulmer (Acrílico sobre tablex) 2014 (100x70)
