= Matter painting =

Painting technique

Tête d’otage No. 14 (Head of a Hostage No. 14, 1944) by Jean Fautrier

Matter painting (French: Haute Pâte, lit. 'thick paste') also known as Matterism refers to a style of painting that emphasizes the material qualities of paint through heavy impasto. The style marked a return to impulses characteristic of abstract expressionism.

Matterism first emerged in Paris in the 1940s in the work of Jean Dubuffet and Jean Fautrier. The style reached widespread popularity in the 1950s.

== See also ==
- Informalism
