= René Laubies =

French painter

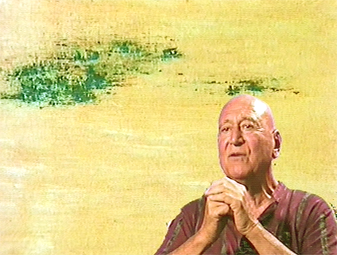
René Laubies

René Laubies was a Colonial French painter, translator, traveler and writer associated with the Lyrical Abstraction, Arte Informale and Tachism movements though particularly linked to the Nuagisme (Cloudism) painters.

== Biography ==
His father was Réunionnaise French-Colonial. His mother was of solid Sinitic roots from a line of upland Phu-Ly Dynasty of Annamese Mandarins.

Laubies was the recipient of the coveted Fénéon Prize for visual art in 1954. He collaborated with American poet Robert Creeley.
