= Teresa Burga =

Peruvian artist (1935–2021)

María Teresa Burga Ruiz
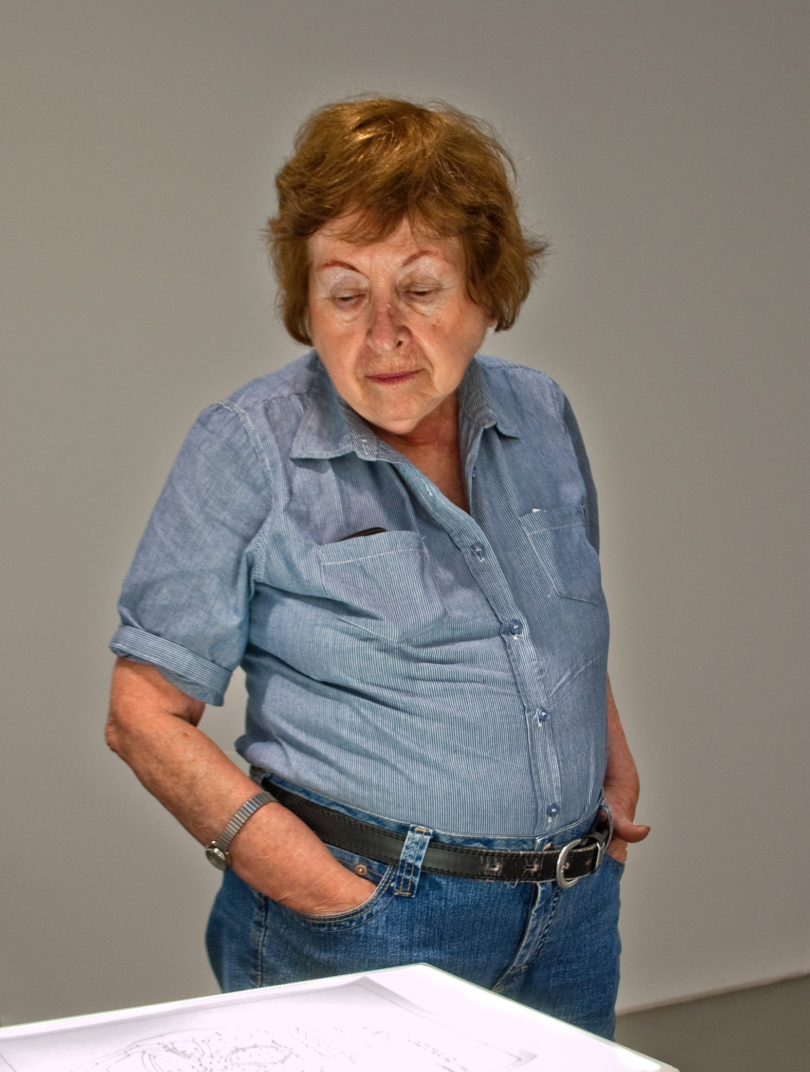
- Born: 1935; Iquitos, Peru
- Died: 11 February 2021 (aged 86)
- Education: Pontifical Catholic University of Peru; School of the Art Institute of Chicago
- Occupation: Multimedia artist
- Years active: 1960s–2021
- Known for: Arte Nuevo

María Teresa Burga Ruiz (1935 – 11 February 2021) was a multimedia artist whose conceptual art works during the late 1960s and 1970s position her as a precursor of media art, technology-based art, and installation art in Peru.

== Early life and education ==
Burga was born in Iquitos, Peru in 1935.

Burga studied painting at the Pontifical Catholic University of Peru in Lima, from which she graduated in 1965. After the graduation, she joined the group Arte Nuevo (1966-8) with Arias Vera, Gloria Gómez-Sánchez and Jaime Dávila. It was a catalyst that made the redefinition of art practices accelerate in Peru in the late 1960s. As a Fulbright Fellow, she attended the School of the Art Institute of Chicago between 1968 and 1970. She was awarded an MFA degree in 1970.

== Career ==
In the 1960s, Burga was a member of the group Arte Nuevo (1966–1968), along with Luis Arias Vera, Gloria Gómez-Sánchez, Jaime Dávila, Víctor Delfín, Emilio Hernández Saavedra, José Tang, Armando Varela, and Luis Zevallos Hetzel. The group is widely credited with the introduction of the new avant-garde tendencies in the Peruvian context, such as Pop art, Op art, and happenings. During this time, she exhibited in Peru and Argentina, including two solo shows of her series of prints Lima imaginada in Lima, at the gallery Cultura y Libertad in 1965, and in Buenos Aires, at the gallery Siglo XXI in 1966. When Burga returned to Peru after her studies in Chicago, the country was under the military government of general Juan Velasco Alvarado. Under the populist policies of the regime, Burga's experimental proposals were deemed as not possessing enough "Peruvian character," and the artist's exhibition possibilities—severely limited. Nonetheless, she realized two ambitious, large-scale multimedia installations at the gallery of Instituto Cultural Peruano Norte-americano in Lima: Autorretrato. Estructura-Informe 9.6.72 (Self-portrait. Structure-report) in 1972, and Cuatro mensajes (Four messages), in 1974.

== Major works ==
According to the Mexican curator Tatiana Cuevas, Burga's most iconic work is the project Perfil de la mujer peruana (Profile of the Peruvian Woman), created with psychologist Marie-France Cathelat during 1980–1981. This multidisciplinary investigation sought to analyze the status of women in Peru taking into account their affective, psychological, sexual, social, educational, cultural, linguistic, religious, professional, economic, political, and legal characteristics and circumstances, and is an example of the second-wave feminism in Latin America. The project was originally presented in 1981 during the I Coloquio de Arte No-Objetual y Arte Urbano (1st Symposium of Non-Objectual and Urban Art) at the Museo de Arte Moderno in Medellín, Colombia; months later it was shown in an exhibition at the Banco Continental in Lima, Peru; by the end of that same year, the full investigation came together as a published book. Burga has resorted to technology based on organizing information into complex mind maps and structures. In her works, Burga anticipated the massive use of information processing and analysis tools for studying personal data, such as Self-portrait. Structure. Report. 9.6.1972 (1972). Subsequently, Burga worked for the Government of Peru in developing information systems that laid down the foundations for creating one of the first computer systems for a government entity in Peru. Interestingly enough, the politics of some of those computerized systems were already present in Burga’s artistic explorations associated with representation and control mechanisms through the organization and management of personal information. Burga worked for the Government of Peru in developing information systems that laid down the foundations for creating one of the first computer systems for a government entity in Peru. Interestingly enough, the politics of some of those computerized systems were already present in Burga’s artistic explorations associated with representation and control mechanisms through the organization and management of personal information.

== Publications and bibliography ==
Teresa Burga; Jassan, Alejandro. Teresa Burga: September 5 – October 12, 2019. Alexander Gray Associates, 2021.

Burga, Teresa. Aleatory Structures. Ringier, 2018.

== Death ==
Burga died 11 February 2021, in Lima from COVID-19. Her death was announced by the Peruvian Minister of Culture.
