= Julien Alvard =

French art critic (1916–1974)

Julien Alvard (1916–1974) was a French art critic known for having launched a modern art movement that he baptized Nuagisme in which young French and foreign painters participated in France. Nuagisme lasted between 1955 and 1973.

Most Nuagisme exhibitions were organized between 1955 and 1973 by Alvard. The painters participating in these exhibitions were not always the same, but were regularly influenced both by American Abstract expressionism and by the Japanese painting and Chinese painting traditions. For example, Nuagisme is marked by the use of emptiness, which suggests infinity.
