= Los Pintores Argentinos en LRA Radio Nacional =

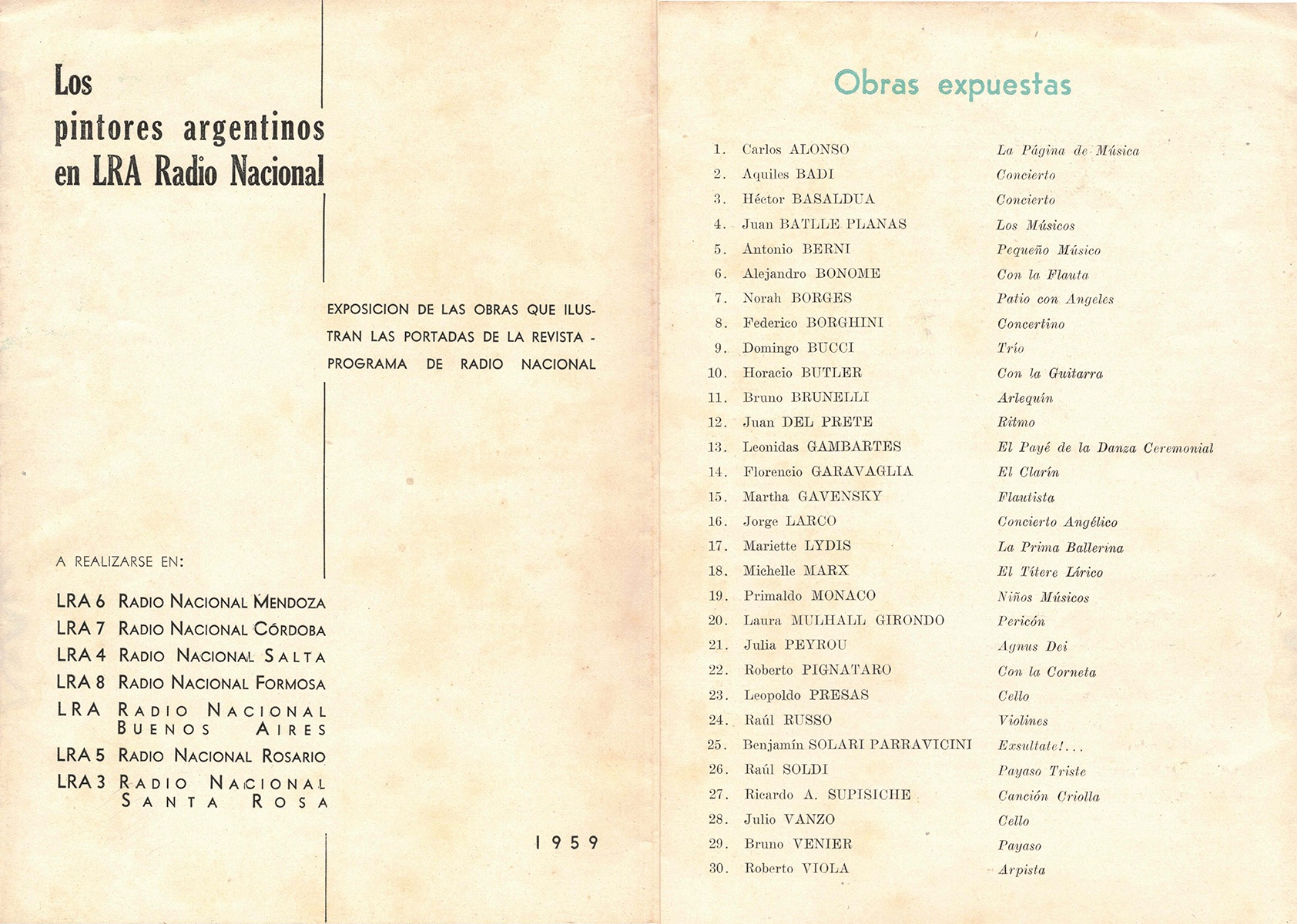
1959 "Los Pintores Argentinos en LRA Radio Nacional" exhibition brochure listing featured artists and corresponding artwork.

Los Pintores Argentinos en LRA Radio Nacional (1959) was a touring art exhibition organized by LRA Radio Nacional, the Argentine national radio station.

This event took place in the context of a national effort to revitalize and promote Argentine art, which originated after the downfall of Juan Perón. It was one in many initiatives emerging from both the public and private sectors seeking "to promote an identity for Argentine art, to situate it in the world, and to secure its long-anticipated recognition" after a decade-long period of isolation from the world scene resulting from Perón's nationalist policies.

The premise of this show was to showcase a collection of thirty modern-figurative paintings by notable artists such as Antonio Berni, Raul Soldi, Juan del Prete, Carlos Alonso, Norah Borges that had been featured in the cover of the radio station's program magazine between 1957 and 1959.

The show traveled to seven Argentine provinces where the station had transmission points—Mendoza, Cordoba, Salta, Formosa, Buenos Aires and La Pampa—and was inaugurated on July 22, 1959 at the Mendoza office.

List of Exhibited Works of Art
Author	Artwork Title
Carlos Alonso	"La Página de Musica"
Aqulies Badi	"Concierto"
Héctor Basaldua	"Concierto"
Juan Batlle Planas	"Los Músicos"
Antonio Berni	"Pequeño Músico"
Alejandro Bonome	"Con La Flauta"
Norah Borges	"Patio con Angeles"
Federico Borghini	"Concertino"
Domingo Bucci	"Trío"
Horacio Butler	"Con la Guitarra"
Bruno Brunelli	"Arlequín"
Juan del Prete	"Ritmo"
Leonidas Gambartes	"El Paye de la Danza Ceremonial"
Florencio Garavaglia	"El Clarín"
Martha Gavensky	"Flautista"
Jorge Larco	"Concierto Angélico"
Mariette Lydis	"La Prima Ballerina"
Michelle Marx	"El Títere Lirico"
Primaldo Monaco	"Niños Músicos"
Laura Mulhall Girondo	"Pericón"
Julia Peyrou	"Agnus Dei"
Roberto Pignataro	"Con la Corneta"
Leopoldo Presas	"Cello"
Raúl Russo	"Violines"
Benjamín Solari Parravicini	"Exsultate!..."
Raúl Soldi	"Payaso Triste"
Ricardo A. Supisiche	"Canción Criolla"
Julio Vanzo	"Cello"
Bruno Venier	"Payaso"
Roberto Viola	"Arpista"
