= Ferruccio Bortoluzzi =

Italian painter (1920–2007)

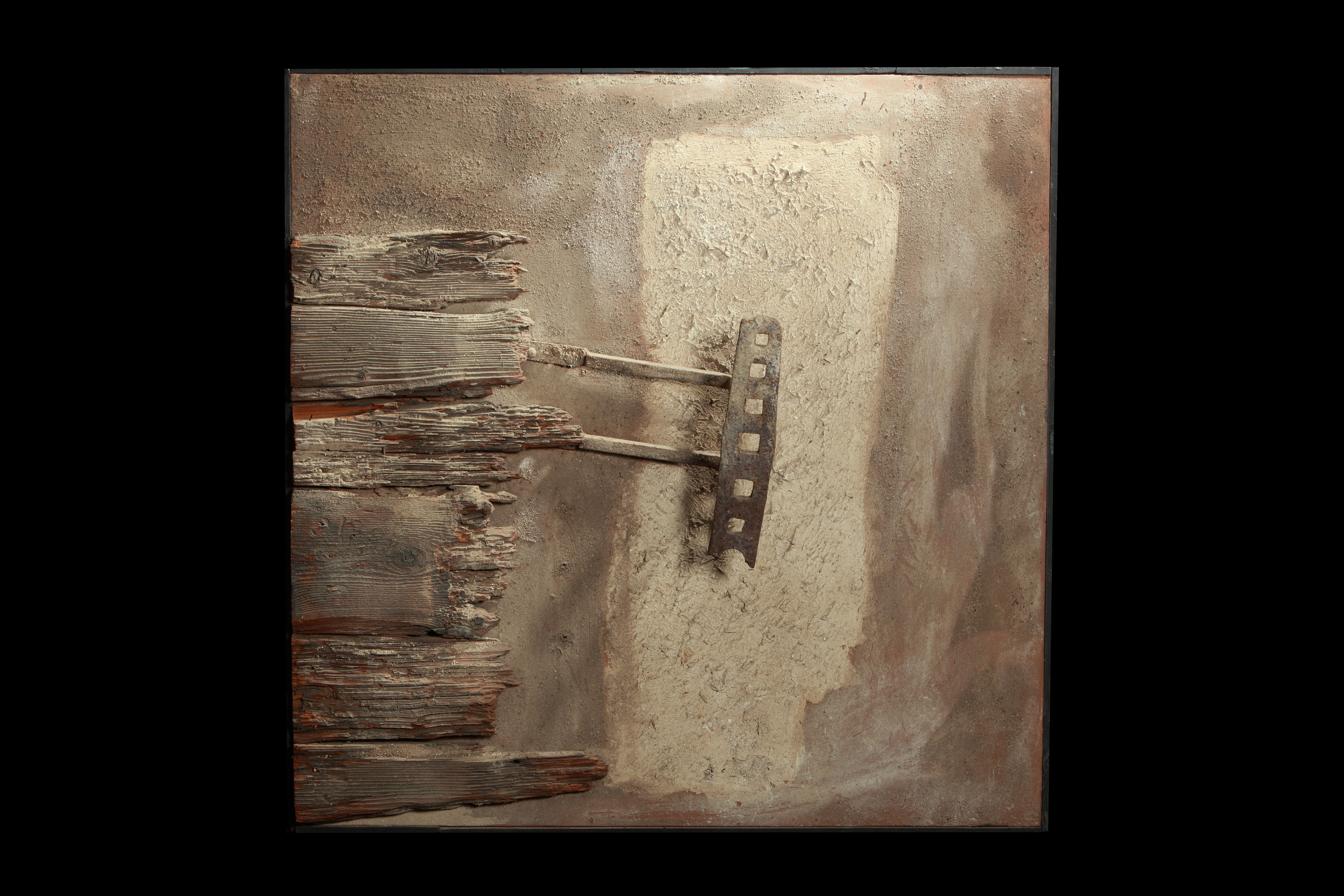
- Composizione n. 80, 1963, wood, iron, 100x100cm
- Born: 6 December 1920; Venice, Italy
- Died: 25 May 2007 (aged 86); Venice, Italy
- Known for: Painting, Sculpture

Ferruccio Bortoluzzi (December 6, 1920 – May 25, 2007) was an Italian modern painter, he was one of the founders of the Centro di Unità della Cultura L'Arco together with venetian artists and writers.

== Biography ==
Born in Venice in 1920, Ferruccio Bortoluzzi received his diploma from the Art Institute there in 1947. He taught at the same Institute, the Artistic High School as well as at the Senior Course of Industrial Design. Immediately following the war, he was one of the founders of "L'Arco" Cultural Center in Venice. From 1943 to 2003 he had several one-man shows both in Italy and abroad, for example the Museum of Modern Art of Cà Pesaro (1982 and 2003) and Fondazione Querini Stampalia (2001). Bortoluzzi's works can be seen in public and private collections in Italy and abroad. A contemporary documentation of his artistic activities can be found at the Historical Archive of Contemporary Art in Venice. The artist died in Venice in 2007.

== Exhibitions ==
- Carnegie Museum of Art - 1964, 1967, 1968
- Biennale di Venezia - 1966
- São Paulo Art Biennial - 1969
- Quadriennale di Roma - 1972
- Fondazione Querini Stampalia - 2001
- Ca' Pesaro - 1982, 2003

== Museums ==
- Galleria Nazionale d'Arte Moderna, Rome
- Ca'Pesaro, Venice
- Museo del Novecento, Milan
- Bologna Museum of Modern Art, Bologna
- Museum of Contemporary Art, Zagreb
- MAX Museo, Chiasso

== Interview with Bortoluzzi ==
"...I remember in the 60s when I first showed my mixed-medium works. They provoked bewilderment, and were even mocked by those collectors who preferred the palette of popular artists to the roughness and asperity of my wood pieces. I feel profoundly Venetian; son of this extraordinary city. My works are dedicated to Venice. In them you can read the affirmation of its decline, the exaltation of the dull colors typical of damp, foggy, winter days. You can smell the brackish odor of the marshes... For this I would have liked something more. My exhibitions in Venice were always followed with dedication by the many friends who live here with me among these stones and the marble of these churches which hold up their majestic domes to the sky. And yet, at times the critics were not very kind to me..."

== See also ==
- Abstract art
- Tachisme
- Art Informel
- Arte Povera

== Bibliography ==
- Ferruccio Bortoluzzi, Enrico Crispolti, Michele Beraldo, Giovanni Bianchi, Electa, Milano, 2014
- Bortoluzzi, Umbro Apollonio, Serra Editore, Roma, 1966
