= Mauro Modin =

Italian painter (born 1963)

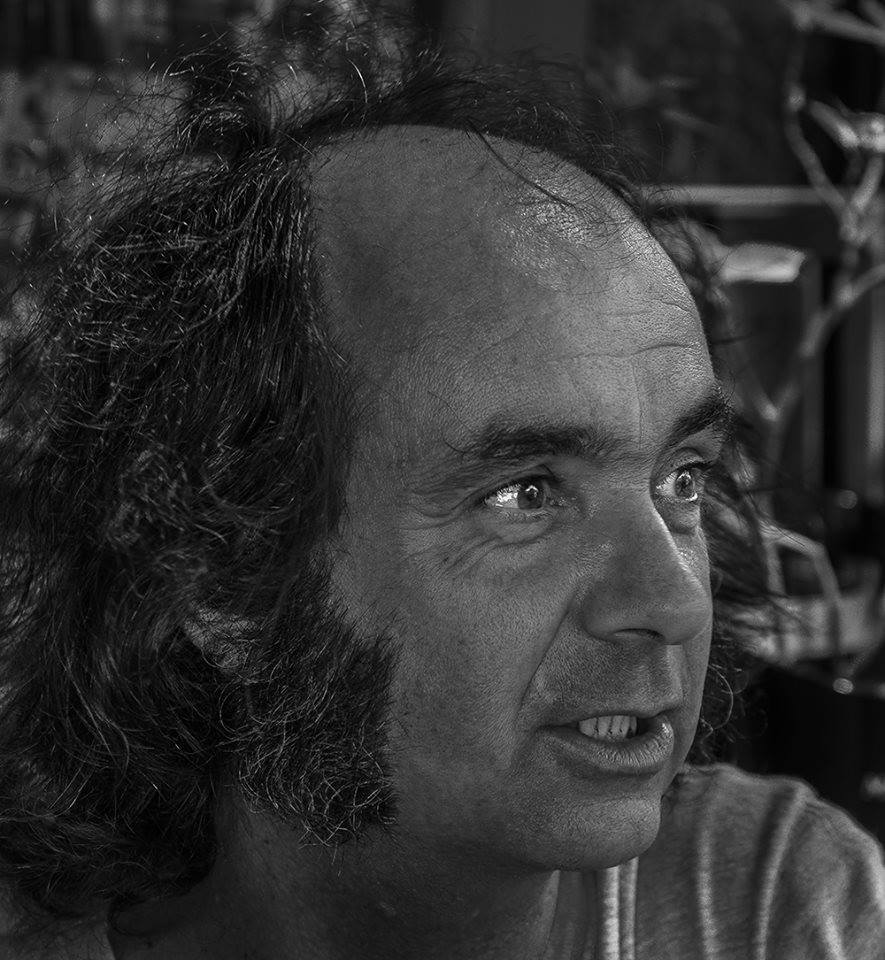
Mauro Modin in 2014.

Mauro Modin (born 1963) is an Italian painter. His work is tightly bound with and contaminated by music, in particular Jazz.

== Biography ==
Modin was born in the city of Bergamo, Italy, in 1963. He grew artistically in Liceo Artistico Marco Polo high school, in Venice, where he was taught by Ferruccio Bortoluzzi, his art professor, who had great influence in the development of Modin's work. In 1982, he took part in his first group exhibition, hosted in Venice by Fondazione Bevilacqua la Masa, where the jury unanimously recognized his creativity and talent. He showed his works in many Jazz festivals in Italy and around Europe, enriching his artistic path thanks to many collaborations with famous musicians. In 2012, he prepared a personal exhibition at Teatro dal Verme (Milan) together with Yusef Lateef. Until today, Mauro Modin has been the one and only visual artist to stage an exhibition inside La Fenice theater in Venice. In 2013, his works (150 pictures and art installations) were shown together in a survey exhibition (1978-2013) set up inside of Parco del Contemporaneo of Forte Marghera, in Mestre (Venice).

== Prizes ==
- In 2002, 1st prize at Concorso Internazionale Walden Coen, Trieste (Italy).
- In 2003, 1st prize at Concorso Internazionale Casa della Pietra, Aurisina (TS, Italy).
- In 2008, he was invited to expose at the Festival des Arts in Montgeron, Paris.

== Exhibitions ==
- 1982 Group, Fondazione Bevilacqua la Masa, Venice (Italy)
- 1988 Personal, Galleria "Al Quadrifoglio", Udine (Italy)
- 1991 Personal, Galleria "Papiro", Mestre (VE) (Italy)
- 1992 Personal, Galleria "Bianco Oro", Roma (Italy)
- 1994 Personal, Galleria "Tiziano-Conegliano", Treviso (Italy)
- 1998 Group Galleria "Tiziano-Cortina", Cortina d'Ampezzo (BL) (Italy)
- 2001 Arte Fiera Jesolo, Galleria Tiziano, Jesolo (VE) (Italy)
- 2001 Group, Comune di Sistiana, Trieste (Italy)
- 2001 Group Internazionale, Galleria al Castello, Sevnica (Slovenia)
- 2001 Group Internazionale, Museo Grafico, Rogaška Slatina (Slovenia)
- 2001 Group Internazionale, Palazzo della RAS, Trieste (Italy)
- 2001 Arte Fiera Padova Galleria 2000, Treviso (Italy)
- 2001 Arte Fiera Parma, Galleria Tiziano, Parma (Italy)
- 2002 Personal, Art Gallery-2, Trieste (Italy)
- 2002 Concorso Internazionale omaggio a Walden Choen, Sistiana (TS) (Italy)
- 2002 Group Internazionale Galleria Commercio, Lubiana (Slovenia)
- 2003 Personal, Galleria d'arte "Nuovo Spazio Mestre", Udine (Italy)
- 2003 Corso Internazionale "Casa della Pietra", Trieste (Italy)
- 2003 Group Palazzo Frangipane, Tarcento (UD) (Italy)
- 2004 Arte Fiera Galleria d'arte Vecchiato, Vicenza (Italy)
- 2004 Société des Artistes Indépendants, Paris (France)
- 2004 Group Alpen-Adria Galerie, Klagenfurt (Austria)
- 2004 Personal, Palazzo del Cinema, Gorizia (Italy)
- 2004 Arte Fiera, Galleria d'arte Vecchiato, Padova (Italy)
- 2005 Personal, Galleria d'arte Serenissima, Gradisca d'Isonzo (GO) (Italy)
- 2005 Personal, Auditorium Gorizia (Italy)
- 2005 Personal, Jazz-Wine, Cormons (GO) (Italy)
- 2006 Group, Galleria Comunale di Velden, Velden am Wörther See (Austria)
- 2007 Personal, Udin Jazz Festival Teatro Palamostre, Udine (Italy)
- 2008 Personal, Société des Artistes Indépendants, Paris (France)
- 2008 Personal, Festi 'val de Sein, Montgeron, Paris (France)
- 2008 Personal, Museo Civico Del Territorio, Palazzo Locatelli, Cormons (GO) (Italy)
- 2008 Group, Galleria La Colomba, Trieste (Italy)
- 2009 Personal, Salone del Mobile, Fuori Salone, Il Salotto di Brera, Milan (Italy)
- 2009 Personal, Milly Art House Gallery, Milan (Italy)
- 2010 Personal, Spazio Abbadesse, Milan (Italy)
- 2010 Personal, Centro Civico Milan 2, Segrate (MI) (Italy)
- 2011 Personal, XL Combines Milan" (Italy)
- 2011 Personal, Al Vapore, Marghera Venice (Italy)
- 2012 Personal, M.D.P.House Gallery Milan (Italy)
- 2012 Personal, CZ95 Giudecca Venice (Italy)
- 2012 Gallery Studio CaFoscari Art Venice (Italy)
- 2012 Personal, Teatro Dal Verme Milan (Italy) with concert of Yusef Lateef & Adam Rudolph
- 2013 Personal, Palazzo Ca' Zanardi Venice (Italy)
- 2013 Group Internazionale, Galerie 30, Le Cannet, Costa Azzurra (France)
- 2013 Personal, La Maison de la Mer, Cavalaire-sur-Mer Costa Azzurra (France)
- 2013 Personal, Antologica, Forte Marghera, Mestre (VE) (Italy)
- 2014 Personal, Palazzo Ca'Zanardi, Venice (Italy)
- 2014 Personal, Gran Teatro La Fenice, Venice (Italy)
- 2014 Personal, Sporting Club Milan 2, Segrate (MI) (Italy)
- 2015 Personal, Centro Civico Giuseppe Verdi, Segrate (MI) (Italy), with concert of Franco Cerri
- 2016 Personal, VAH Venice Art House gallery, Venice (Italy)
- 2017 Personal, Villa Widmann, Jam Colours, Mira (VE)
- 2017 Personal, Sala Antiche Mura, Monfalcone (GO)
- 2018 Personal, Milano Arte, The Factory (Fabbrica Del Vapore), Milano
- 2019 International prize of contemporary art "Arte Firenze 2019 - Premio Leonardo da Vinci" Bastogi Palace, Florence
- 2019 IconArt 2019 prize, Stazione marittima, Salerno
