= Roberto L. Pignataro =

Argentine artist

Roberto Lucio Pignataro
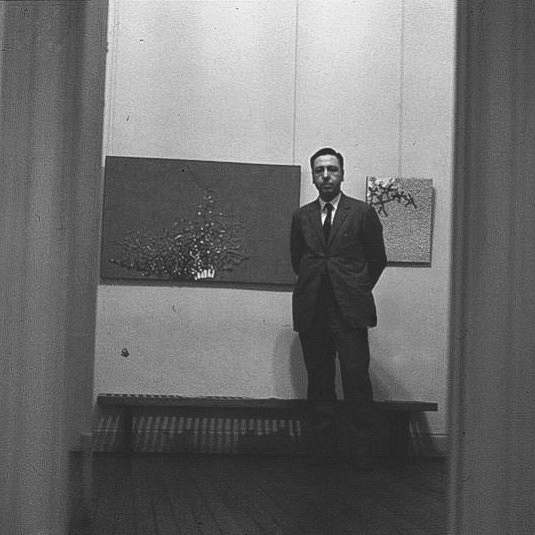
- Roberto Pignataro at Galería Lirolay, 1970

Roberto Lucio Pignataro (1928–2008) was an Argentine Informalist artist. He was known for the innovative composition technics he developed and diversity of styles he applied to his artwork.

His artistic legacy provides a rich insight into the art movements that took place in Argentina from the 1950s through the 1970s.

== Education & career ==
Roberto Lucio Pignataro graduated from Escuela de Bellas Artes Manuel Belgrano as a Professional Illustrator in 1955 and as a Teacher of Visual Arts in 1958. He also obtained a degree as Professor in Painting at Escuela Nacional de Artes Visuales Prilidiano Pueyrredón in 1961.

Some of Pignataro's notable art teachers were: Aurelio Macci and Héctor José Cartier.

Roberto Lucio Pignataro held 28 art exhibitions during his lifetime: 27 in Buenos Aires, Argentina and one in Miami, Florida, and participated in two collective art exhibitions: "Los Pintores Argentinos in Radio Nacional" in 1959 and "Collages" in 1982. He also published three books featuring experimental art techniques.

== Artistic styles and techniques ==
Pignataro's work was often described by critics as Informalism, lyrical abstraction, having an oriental influence, kinetic art, and hard to categorize. Other influences that can be observed throughout his work are from Cubism, De Stijl, Geometric Abstraction, Japanese Ink Wash Painting, Gestural Abstraction, Tachisme, Abstract Expresionism and Abstract Calligraphy.

His artwork most commonly features oil painting, paper collage, and assemblage techniques, all of which he often combined into texture-rich art pieces.

== Books and museum ==
Roberto Lucio Pignataro published three books during his career, featuring experimental printing technics.

- "A través de estampas I", 1968
- "En Slides Color", 1972
- "A través de estampas II", 1974

His artwork titled "R.F. 434 C.O." is in the permanent collection of the Buenos Aires Museum of Modern Art along with two of his experimental art books: "A través de estampas I" and "A través de estampas II".

== Awards ==
In 1957, his painting "Con la corneta" was selected among the 4 winners at Los Pintores Argentinos en LRA Radio Nacional, a nation-wide art contest organized by LRA Radio Nacional. "Con la corneta" was featured on the front page of the LRA Radio Nacional program guide (November issue, 1958). The jury was made up of some notable Argentine art critics and artists: Raul Soldi, Jorge Larco, Córdova Iturburu, Eduardo Eiriz Maglione and Manuel Mujica Láinez.

Soon after this, Roberto Pignataro quit participating in art contests, moving the focus of his career exclusively to solo exhibitions.

== Resources ==
Roberto Pignataro's Art Exhibits Timeline

Artist's Website
