= Ruth Schmidt Stockhausen =

German painter

Ruth Schmidt Stockhausen (4 April 1922 on Norderney – 22 December 2014 in Dornum) was a German painter, sculptor and graphic artist, inspired by Informalism.

== Life and works ==
Ruth Schmidt was born in April 1922 on the Island of Norderney in East Frisia. Her father Albert Schmidt (1877–1940) was a military officer in charge of fortification works along the German coastline; her mother Annemarie Schmidt, née Vollenbroich (1897–1968), was an office employee by profession and a hobby painter. Ruth spent her early childhood on the island, where the painter Hans Trimborn (1891–1979) was a frequent household guest. At the age of five she contracted tuberculosis. Long stays in hospital encouraged her passion for drawing and painting. When her father was transferred to Wilhelmshaven in 1930, the Schmidt family lived there until 1941 when the bombardments during World War II made them retreat to the paternal property in the Hessian village of Stockhausen near Leun.

At her father's insistence Ruth had agreed to undergo more practical teacher training in handicrafts, which she completed in Hildesheim in 1941. Teaching positions in Melle (near Osnabrück) and Lesum (near Bremen) followed. In 1944 her grant application to the German foundation for the advancement of young talent (Begabtenförderungswerk) was successful and she took part in a master class program in the fine arts, under Prof. H.W. Berger, among other staff from the Art Academy, which had been temporarily evacuated from Stuttgart to a castle away from the city. The Armistice cut the course short. Back home in her atelier in Stockhausen, Ruths main breadwinning occupation became portraiture for the Allied Forces. Her younger brother Horst Schmidt recalled that the attic of the house had turned into a kind of artist colony: Ruth shared the rooms under the roof with her cousin Giselher Neuhaus (1916–1994), a sculptor in his own right; and her elder brother Albert (1919–1996), a painter too. In 1946 she attended another drawing course by Prof. G. Kranz in Lauterbach, entered the local artist association Oberhessischer Künstlerbund, and began to exhibit her portraits and watercolor landscapes in Dillenburg, Giessen, Marburg, Wetzlar, and other cities within the province.

Her signature, initially "Ruth Schmidt" or just plain "R.", made more distinguishable—and importantly—degenderized as "R. Schmidt Stockhausen", began to attract interest. In 1952 the wealthy building contractor and industrialist Hermann Lindemann (1897–1954) became her patron and procured for her and her sculptor cousin Giselher Neuhaus apartments in the Bonn suburb of Bad Godesberg. She closed a contract with his publishing house Dikreiter as illustrator and executed various other commissions, such as sculptures together with her cousin. During the 1950s Ruth Schmidt Stockhausen traveled to Paris, Rome, Venice, and other Italian towns, making important acquaintances in the international art world. Leading proponents of Informalism greatly influenced her approach and there was a clear shift toward abstraction and material painting. In 1958-59 Ruth participated in the exhibitions of the Deutscher Künstlerbund in Essen and Wiesbaden – a third invitation would have meant she had joined their august ranks. But that never came to be, because she met and married a medical doctor, Hans-Dieter Hentschel (1921–2016) in 1959 and moved away to the spa town of Bad Nauheim. Large abstract oil paintings reappeared on her easel soon after the birth of her son Klaus Hentschel in 1961 and her exhibiting activities continued unabated. Large sculptures emerged in the following decade. She also taught a course in free painting at the Kunstschule Westend (now called Academy of Visual Arts) in Frankfurt am Main 1976–1979.

When her son finished his schooling, Ruth Schmidt Stockhausen felt free to leave Bad Nauheim and return to her native turf East Frisia in 1983. She converted the barn of an old farmhouse in Dornum on the German coast—within eyeshot of Norderney—into a summer atelier, where many more large abstract paintings—her own variant of Informalism—and sculptures took shape under the influence of her coastal surroundings.

Ruth Schmidt Stockhausen is one of very few women among the acknowledged Informalist artists. Throughout her creative period spanning eight decades, Ruth Schmidt Stockhausen produced more than 4,700 documentable works of art and participated in well over 300 exhibitions. After her death at the age of 92, her ashes were scattered in the North Sea by the shores of the neighboring island of Spiekeroog. The artist's estate and property are now part of a museum managed by the Ruth Schmidt Stockhausen Stiftung, a not-for-profit foundation for the furtherance of her legacy in the fine arts.

== Distinctions ==
- Guest exhibitor of the Deutscher Künstlerbund in 1958 and 1959
- Exhibitor at the Biennale 6 in Paris, Palais de Louvre, Pavillon de Marsan, 1957
- Lauditory mention in Rome 1972 and Medaille, awarded by the Parisian Fédération Internationale Culturelle Féminine in Athens 1973
- Kunstpreis Dornum 2003

== Memberships ==
- Oberhessischer Künstlerbund (1946–1973), Gruppe 9 (1974–1983)
- GEDOK Bonn (since 1954) and Künstlergruppe Bonn (since 1955)
- Berufsverband Bildender Künstler (BBK) Frankfurt (1961–83) and BBK Ostfriesland (1983–2014)
- Founding patron of Soroptimist International, Club Ostfriesland – Norden (1994)
- Kunstverein Norden and Kunstkreis Dornum
