= Nuagisme =

French art movement

Nuagisme (French pronunciation: [nɥaʒism]; literally Cloudism) is a French art-critical term for an art movement that was advanced in the 1950s by French art critic Julien Alvard (1916–1974) in which young French and foreign painters participated in France. Nuagisme lasted between 1955 and 1973.

== Art historical context ==
The major contribution of Nuagist painting was to find (and encourage) transparency and depth in painting that the cold flatness of Geometric abstraction had rejected from the pictorial field. Nuagisme can be considered part of the art movements called Lyrical Abstraction, Arte Informale and Tachism.

== Style ==
René Duvillier's whirlpools, Frédéric Benrath's knots and volutes, Fernando Lerin's obscure forms reflected Nuagisme's openness to natural elements which can sometimes evoke clouds. Most Nuagisme exhibitions were organized between 1955 and 1973 by Alvard. The painters participating in these exhibitions were not always the same, but were regularly influenced both by American Abstract expressionism and by the Japanese painting and Chinese painting traditions. For example, Nuagisme is marked by the use of emptiness, which suggests infinity.

Nuagist painters embraced the imaginative faculties of natural effects, leading to painted abstract landscapes designed as a link between external nature and the internal landscape. They do not reproduce skies in a figurative approach, but paint clouds for their vitality. Materialism is also called into question by the Nuagist painters who expressed the fluidity of elusive spaces by blotting with a rag on freshly painted backgrounds. This blotting contributed to the desired Nuagist transparency effect.

== Artists ==
- Jean Messagier
- Frédéric Benrath
- René Duvillier
- Pierre Graziani
- René Laubiès
- Marcelle Loubchansky
- Nasser Assar
- Fernando Lerin
