= Tachisme =

French style of abstract painting

Serge Poliakoff Composition: Gray and Red, 1964

Tachisme (alternative spelling: Tachism, derived from the French word tache, stain; French pronunciation: [taʃism]) is a French style of abstract painting popular in the 1940s and 1950s. The term is said to have been first used with regard to the movement in 1951. It is often considered to be the European response and equivalent to abstract expressionism, although there are stylistic differences (American abstract expressionism tended to be more "aggressively raw" than tachisme). It was part of a larger postwar movement known as Art Informel (or Informel), which abandoned geometric abstraction in favour of a more intuitive form of expression, similar to action painting. Another name for Tachism is abstraction lyrique (related to American lyrical abstraction). COBRA is also related to Tachisme, as is Japan's Gutai group.

After World War II the term School of Paris often referred to Tachisme, the European equivalent of American abstract expressionism. Important proponents were Jean-Paul Riopelle, Wols, Jean Dubuffet, Pierre Soulages, Nicolas de Staël, Hans Hartung, Gérard Schneider, Serge Poliakoff, Georges Mathieu, and Jean Messagier, among several others. (See list of artists below.)

According to Chilvers, the term tachisme "was first used in this sense in about 1951 (the French critics Charles Estienne and Pierre Guéguen have each been credited with coining it) and it was given wide currency by [French critic and painter] Michel Tapié in his book Un Art autre (1952)."

Tachisme was a reaction to Cubism and is characterized by spontaneous brushwork, drips, and blobs of paint straight from the tube, and sometimes scribbling reminiscent of calligraphy.

Tachisme is closely related to Informalism or Art Informel, which, in its 1950s French art-critical context, referred not so much to a sense of "informal art" as "a lack or absence of form itself"–non-formal or un-form-ulated–and not a simple reduction of formality or formalness. Art Informel was more about the absence of premeditated structure, conception or approach (sans cérémonie) than a mere casual, loosened or relaxed art procedure.

== Artists ==
- Pierre Alechinsky (born 1927) – Cobra group
- Karel Appel (1921–2006) – Cobra group
- Frank Avray Wilson (1914–2009)
- Jean René Bazaine (1904–2001)
- Roger Bissière (1888–1964)
- Ferruccio Bortoluzzi (1920–2007)
- Norman Bluhm (1921–1999) – American associated with this movement
- Bram Bogart (1921–2012) – Cobra group
- Alexander Bogen (1916–2010)
- Denis Bowen (1921–2006)
- Camille Bryen (1907–1977)
- Alberto Burri (1915–1995)
- Beauford Delaney (1901–1979) – American associated with this movement
- Jean Dubuffet (1901–1985)
- Agenore Fabbri (1911–1998)
- Jean Fautrier (1898–1964)
- Lucio Fontana (1899–1968)
- Sam Francis (1923–1994) – American associated with this movement
- Elaine Hamilton (1920–2010) – American associate of Tapié, influenced by this movement
- Hans Hartung (1904–1989)
- Jacques Hérold (1910–1987)
- Laurent Jiménez-Balaguer (born 1928)
- Paul Jenkins (1923–2012) – American associated with this movement
- Asger Jorn (1914–1973) – Cobra group
- Karel Kuklík (1937–2019) – Czech photographer regarded as a representative of Informel in photography.
- Joseph Lacasse (1894–1975)
- René Laubies (1922–2006)
- André Lanskoy (1902–1976)
- François Lanzi (1916–1988)
- Maria Lassnig (1919–2014)
- Georges Mathieu (1921–2012)
- Jean Messagier (1920–1999)
- Henri Michaux (1899–1984)
- Jean Miotte (born 1926)
- Ludwig Merwart (1913–1979)
- Zoran Mušič (1909–2005)
- Ernst Wilhelm Nay (1902–1968) – German influenced by this movement
- Gen Paul (1895–1975)
- Serge Poliakoff (1900–1969)
- Marie Raymond (1908–1988)
- Jean-Paul Riopelle (1923–2002)
- Maria Helena Vieira da Silva (1908–1992)
- Emilio Scanavino (1922–1986)
- Gérard Schneider (1896–1986)
- Emil Schumacher (1912–1999)
- Pierre Soulages (1919–2022)
- Nicolas de Staël (1914–1955)
- Pierre Tal-Coat (1905–1985) - French
- Michel Tapié (1909–1987)
- Antoni Tàpies (1923–2012)
- Bram van Velde (1895–1981)
- Louis Van Lint (1909–1986)
- François Willi Wendt (1909–1970)
- Wols (Alfred Otto Wolfgang Schulze) (1913–1951)
- Zao Wou Ki (1921–2013)

== See also ==
- Nuagisme
- French art
- Abstract expressionism
- Action painting
- Lyrical Abstraction
- École de Paris
- Gutai group
- Spatialism
- Karl Otto Götz
