= Informalism =

Art movement

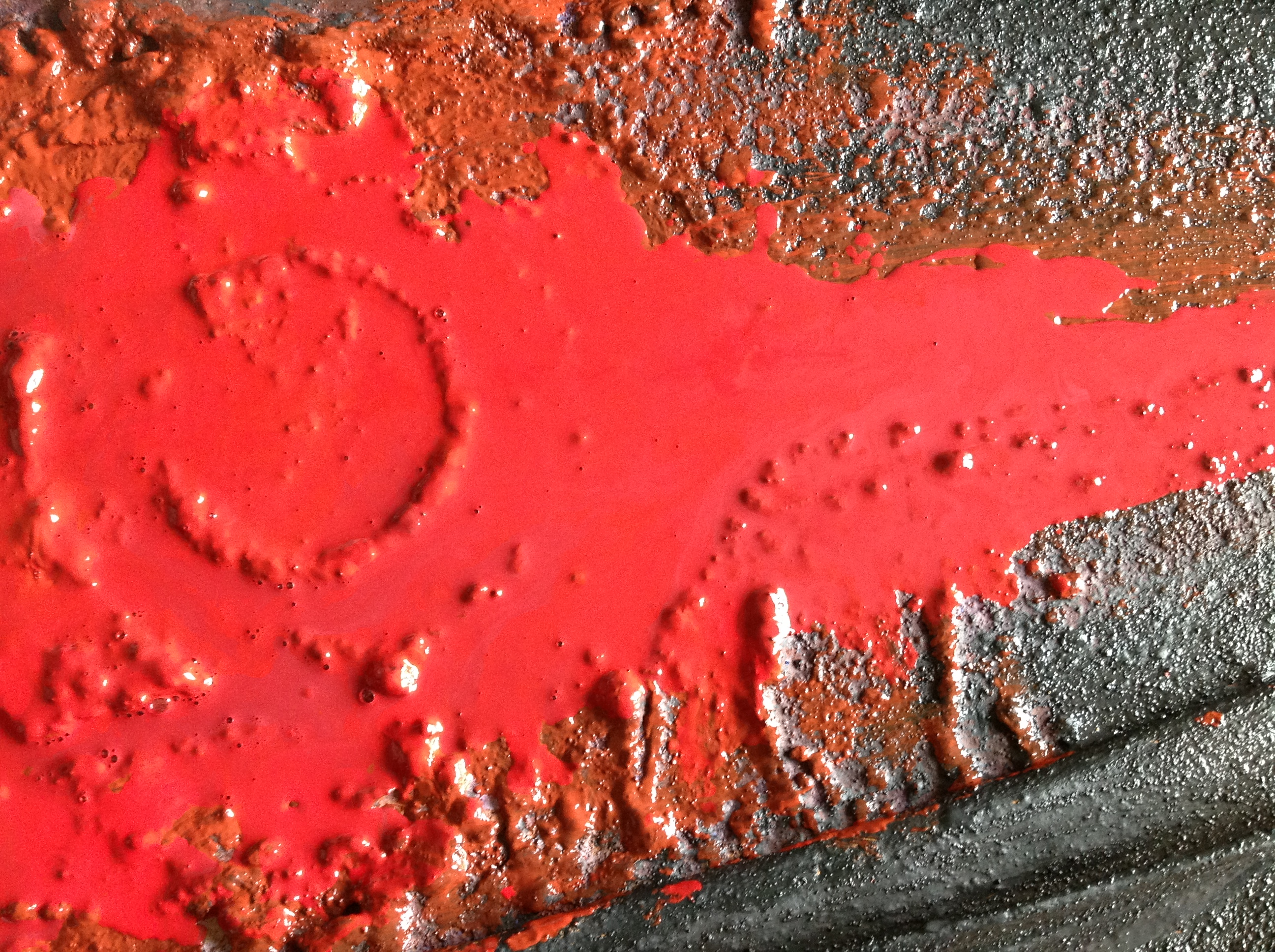
Painting by Laurent Jiménez-Balaguer

Informalism or Art Informel (French pronunciation: [aʁ ɛ̃fɔʁmɛl]) is a pictorial movement from the 1943–1950s, that includes all the abstract and gestural tendencies that developed in France and the rest of Europe during World War II, similar to American abstract expressionism. Several distinguishing trends are identified within the movement such as lyrical abstraction, matter painting, New Paris School, tachisme and art brut. The French art critic Michel Tapié coined the term "art autre" (other art) in the homonymous book published in 1952 in relation to non-geometric abstract art. It was instrumental in improving the concept of abstract art in France during the early 1950s. Its use in the expression of political ideologies in South America during the early 1950s was quite common, as it was seen as the main way to show support for the changing political climate.

== Pictorial practices ==
Within this style, each artist allows full freedom of expression to the unforeseen quality of materials (a taste for stains or chance) and randomness of gestures, thus rejecting drawing and control and the traditional conception of painting and its development that evolves from the idea to the completed work via sketches and projects. It is an open work that a spectator can interpret freely. The pictorial adventure is completely new; instead of going from the meaning to constructing the corresponding signs, the artist begins with the making of signs and gives the corresponding meaning. In the works of Laurent Jiménez-Balaguer, the language of signs is further deconstructed, allowing for a universal interpretation of a private language. The contribution of music produced the art of musical informalism. Plastic characteristics of this painting are: spontaneity of the gesture, automatism, expressive use of material, the nonexistence of preconceived ideas, the experience that the deed generates the idea, and the work is the place and the privileged moment whereby the artist discovers himself; it is the end of the reproduction of the object for the representation of the theme that becomes the end of the painting. There is a closely related concept – Lyrical Abstraction, exemplified by the works of Georges Mathieu, Hans Hartung, and Pierre Soulages.

== Uses ==
=== Politics ===
==== Venezuela ====
During the 1950s and 1960s, at the height of the Venezuelan dictatorship, Venezuelan artists, such as Carlos Cruz Diez, Gego, and others, used Informalist art in response to the shift from dictatorship to democracy that their country was dealing with during this time. Their art represented their feelings on the matter as well as their response to this shift and to represent a lot of huge figures in the change over from a dictatorship into democracy. They used art to represent their support for the shift away from dictatorship during these times of extreme political turbulence in their country.

=== Improvement on Abstraction ===
During the Early 1950s, France was a hotbed for Informalist art, referred to as Un art autre, or art informel, which were terms coined by French art critic Michel Tapié, who published a book by the name of Un Art Autre the same year as the exhibition of the same name. This style was about more than just the paintings, as it also referred to concepts such as lyrical abstraction and painting styles such as tachisme, and matter painting. Artists were inspired by European paintings, as well as American expressionism, while using automatism as their way of conveying this new style of art. Important artists that came out of this period in France were artists such as Pierre Soulages and Jean-Paul Riopelle.

== Informalist painters ==
- Enrico Accatino
- José Balmes
- Gracia Barrios
- Willi Baumeister
- Vasco Bendini
- Alberto Burri
- Mário Cesariny
- Eduardo Chillida
- Fred Friedrich
- Soshana Afroyim
- Jean Dubuffet
- René Duvillier
- Jean Fautrier
- Elsa Gramcko
- Hans Hartung
- Laurent Jiménez-Balaguer
- Luigi Malice
- César Manrique
- Georges Mathieu
- Henri Michaux
- Manolo Millares
- Lucio Muñoz
- Ernst Wilhelm Nay
- Georges Noël
- Serge Poliakoff
- Roberto L. Pignataro
- Marie Raymond
- Jean-Paul Riopelle
- Ruth Schmidt Stockhausen
- Bernard Schultze
- Pablo Serrano
- K.R.H. Sonderborg
- Pierre Soulages
- Nicolas de Staël
- Antoni Tàpies
- Emilio Vedova
- Maria Helena Vieira da Silva
- Wols
- Rodrigo Franzão

== Collections ==
Year	Title	Location
1952	Un Art Autre	Paris, France
2018	Contesting Modernity: Informalism in Venezuela, 1955–1975	Museum of Fine Arts, Houston

== See also ==
- Matterism
- Nuagisme
