= Jean Fautrier =

French painter (1898–1964)

- Born: May 16, 1898; Paris, France
- Died: July 21, 1964 (aged 66); Châtenay-Malabry, France
- Education: Royal Academy of Art; Slade School
- Known for: Painting, sculpture
- Movement: Art Informel (Tachisme)

Jean Fautrier (French pronunciation: [ʒɑ̃ fotʁije]; May 16, 1898 – July 21, 1964) was a French painter, illustrator, printmaker, and sculptor. He was one of the most important practitioners of Tachisme.

== Early life ==
Jean Fautrier was born in Paris in 1898. He was given his unwed mother's surname, and raised by his grandmother until she and his father both died in 1908. He then moved to London to be with his mother. There, in 1912, he began to study at the Royal Academy of Arts. Unsatisfied by instruction he thought too rigid, he left to study briefly at the Slade School, which was reputed to be more avant-garde. He was disappointed again and decided to teach himself, devoting himself to painting. The works he saw in the Tate Gallery made a far greater impression on him; he especially admired the paintings of J. M. W. Turner. He was called up for the French Army in 1917, but was discharged in 1921 due to his poor health.

He first exhibited his paintings at the Salon d'Automne in 1922 and at the Fabre Gallery in 1923. It was at the Galerie Fabre that he met art dealer Jeanne Castel, his first collector and friend. In 1923 he began producing etchings and engravings. His first solo exhibition was at the Galerie Visconti in Paris, in 1924.

In 1927, he painted a series of pictures (still lifes, nudes, landscapes) in which black dominates. In 1928 he met André Malraux through Castel. Malraux asked Fautrier to illustrate a text of his choice, but copyright issues kept him from using his first choice, Arthur Rimbaud's Les Illuminations, and he settled instead with Dante's Inferno. He produced 34 lithographs, but the publication, proposed by Gallimard, was deemed impossible and the project was abandoned in 1930. Until 1933 he divided his efforts between sculpture and painting. Short on funds, he spent the years 1934–1936 living in the resort of Tignes, where he made his living as a ski instructor and started a jazz club.

== World War II and after ==
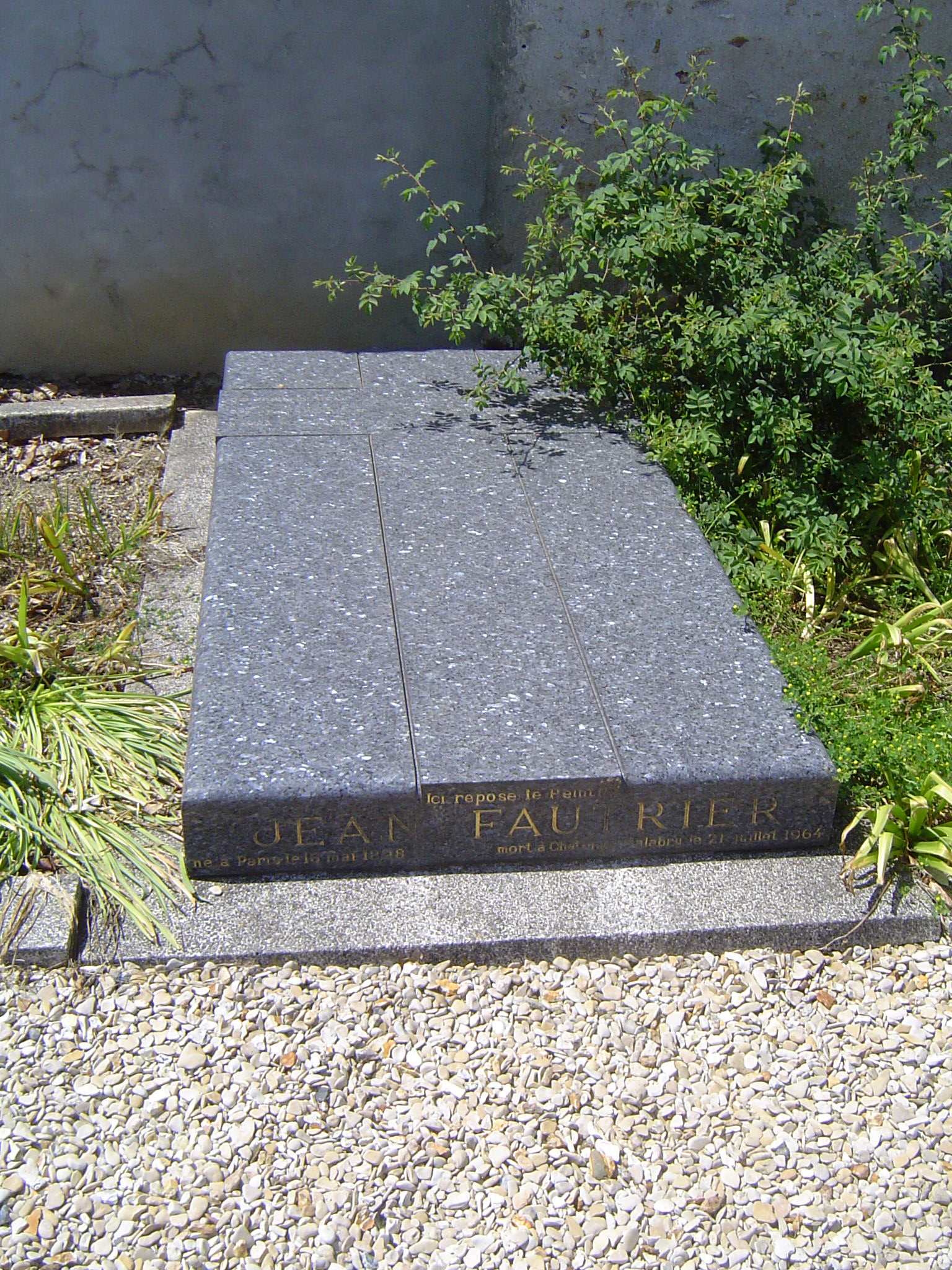
Fautrier's grave in Châtenay-Malabry

In 1939, just as World War II was beginning, Fautrier left the mountains, moving to Marseille, Aix-en-Provence, and Bordeaux before finally returning to Paris in 1940 and starting to paint once again. In Paris he met several poets and writers for whom he created illustrations. In January 1943, he was arrested by the German Gestapo. After brief imprisonment, he fled Paris and found refuge in Châtenay-Malabry, where he began work on the project of the Otages (or "Hostages"). These paintings were a response to the torture and execution of French citizens by the Nazis outside his residence, and were exhibited in 1945 with the Drouin gallery. In the years that followed, Fautrier worked on the illustrations of several works, among them L'Alleluiah by Georges Bataille, and made a series of paintings devoted to small familiar objects.

His late work is abstract, generally small in scale, often combining mixed media on paper. In 1960 he won the international grand prize at the Venice Biennale as well as another major award at the Tokyo Biennale the following year. He died in Châtenay-Malabry in 1964, the same year in which he had made donations to the Musée de l’Ile-de-France in Sceaux and Musée d’Art Moderne de la Ville de Paris. A retrospective of his work opened there later that year. and was organized by the Gianadda Foundation at Martigny in January–March 2005.

== List of some works ==
- (1942) Large Tragic Head
- (1942) Reclining Woman IV
- (1943–44) Head of a Hostage
- (1945) Dark Landscape
- (1945) Dépouille
- (1945) The Executed
- (1946) Hostages on a Black Ground
- (1947) Baby Mine
- (1949) Violet Hostage
