= Franck Prazan =

French art collector

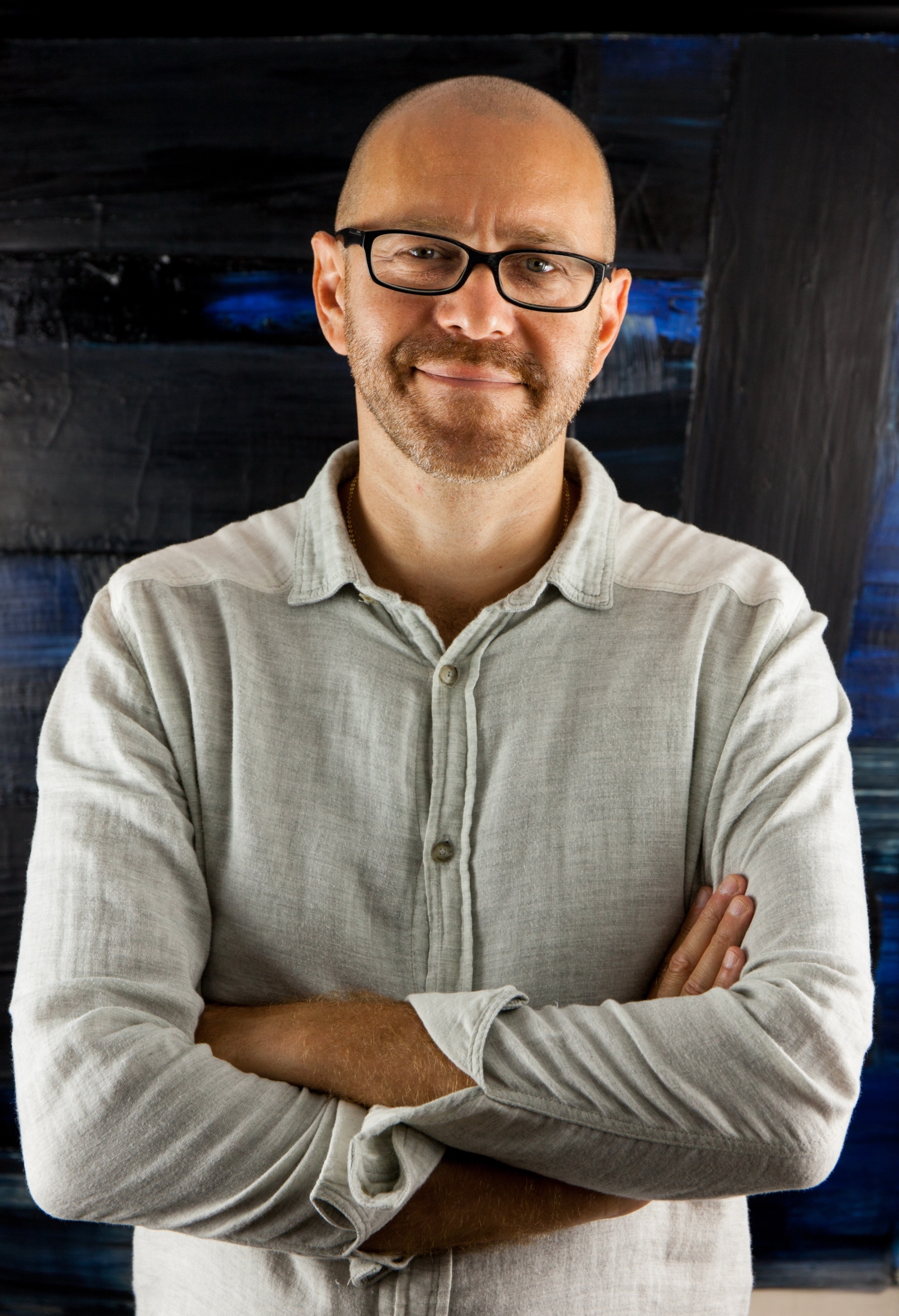
Franck Prazan

Franck Prazan (born 1966) is a French art collector and the owner of Applicat-Prazan gallery in Paris. He specialises in School of Paris, a Post-War abstract painting movement, whose main artists include Jean-Michel Atlan, Pierre Soulages, Serge Poliakoff, Nicolas de Staël.

The Applicat-Prazan gallery regularly attends international modern art fairs, such as artgenève, Tefaf Maastricht, Art Basel Hong Kong, Tefaf New York Spring, Art Basel Basel, Frieze Masters, Foire Internationale d'Art Contemporain, Art Basel Miami Beach.

== Biography ==
Franck Prazan graduated from European Business School. He then occupied managerial positions at Dior Couture, Cartier International and Philippe Charriol.

In 1996, he joined Christie's France as Managing Director. As such, he oversaw its development from a simple representative office to a fully fledged auction house, moving the company to the Avenue Matignon in Paris.

He succeeded his father, Bernard Prazan, in 2004 and has been running the gallery since then. In 2010, the gallery opened a second site on the Right Bank at 14 avenue Matignon.

In 2017, Franck Prazan was contacted to sell two paintings by Jean Dubuffet and Georges Mathieu on behalf of the Museum of Modern Art (MoMA), New York.

Franck Prazan has been a Member of the Board of Trustees at TEFAF from 2017 to 2021.

Since 2022, Franck Prazan seats at the selection committee of Art Basel in Basel.

Franck Prazan also manages the dressage stable Applicat Horses, whose stallion Benji*Applicat-Prazan was the 2024 French National 3-Year-Old Champion. The mare Fiadora*Applicat-Prazan was French 4-Year-Old Champion in 2022, 5-Year-Old reserve-Champion in 2023, 6-Year-Old Champion in 2024, 7-Year-Old Champion in 2025, and twice represented France at the World Breeding Dressage Championships for Young Horses — in Ermelo in 2023 and in Verden in 2025.

Fiadora is ridden by Maxime Collard. Benji is ridden by Mathilde Juglaret.

=== Exhibitions ===
- 2006 : Schneider, Œuvres majeures autour d’un tableau d’exception
- 2007 : Mes années 50, Collection Alain Delon
- 2007 : Présence, silences, hommage à Geer van Velde
- 2008 : Serge Poliakoff
- 2008 : Jean-Michel Atlan
- 2009 : Dialogues l Autour de Pierre Soulages
- 2010 : Jean-Michel Atlan, les détrempes
- 2010 : Jean-Pierre Pincemin
- 2010 : Panorama Jean Fautrier
- 2011 : 14 Matignon, Exposition inaugurale
- 2012 : André Masson
- 2012 : Alfred Manessier, Tours, Favellas et autres œuvres monumentales
- 2013 : Maurice Estève, works on paper
- 2013 : Serge Poliakoff
- 2014 : Georges Mathieu
- 2015 : Maurice Estève, Paintings
- 2016 : Zoran Music
- 2018 : Le grand œil de Michel Tapié
- 2019 : Justice! 2 chefs-d’œuvre de Roger-Edgar Gillet
- 2019 : BBB
- 2022 : Georges Mathieu, Paintings 1951-1962
- 2023 : Jean Hélion, un florilège
- 2024 : Camille Bryen, aux racines de l'informel
- 2025 : Gérard Schneider
