= Guglielmo Achille Cavellini =

Italian artist and art collector (1914–1990)

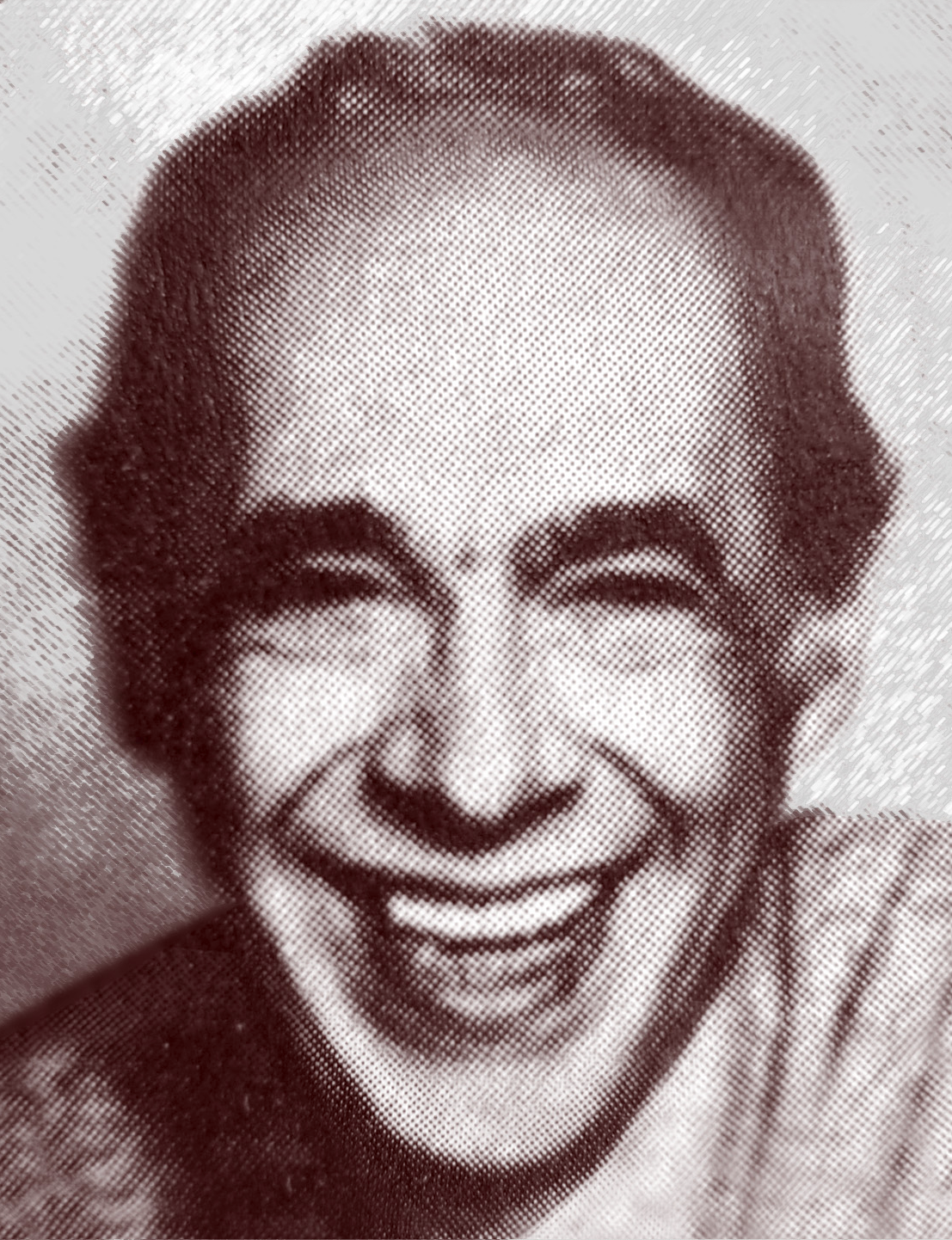
- Born: 11 August 1914; Brescia, Italy
- Died: 20 November 1990 (aged 76); Brescia, Italy
- Movement: Mail art Performance art Neo-Dada

Guglielmo Achille Cavellini (11 September 1914 – 20 November 1990), also known as GAC, was an Italian artist and art collector. After his initial activity as a painter, in the 1940s and 1950s, he became one of the major collectors of contemporary Italian abstract art, developing a deep relationship of patronage and friendship with the artists. This experience has its pinnacle in the exhibition Modern painters of the Cavellini collection at the National Gallery of Modern Art in Rome in 1957. In the 1960s Cavellini resumed his activity as an artist, with an ample production spanning from Neo-Dada to performance art to mail art, of which he became one of the prime exponents with the Exhibitions at Home and the Round Trip works. In 1971 he invented autostoricizzazione (self-historicization), upon which he acted to create a deliberate popular history surrounding his existence. He also authored the books Abstract Art (1959), Man painter (1960), Diary of Guglielmo Achille Cavellini (1975), Encounters/Clashes in the Jungle of Art (1977) and Life of a Genius (1989).

== Biography ==
Guglielmo Achille Cavellini was born in Brescia on 11 September 1914. His parents were from Tuscany, coming from two small villages over Pontremoli, in the Lunigiana. After the marriage and the birth of their first daughter Adele in 1900, they moved to Switzerland where the father worked as a bricklayer, then became a hawker in Lombardy. They lived for some time in Arona, on the Lake Maggiore, where in 1911 their son Mario was born. Then they moved to Brescia, where they opened a store called Bazar 33. In 1918 Adele died from the Spanish flu.

Cavellini studied for nine years at the Cesare Arici Jesuit college. At 16 years he started the Istituto tecnico, but he was forced to interrupt his studies to help his parents in the store. Since his childhood he drew and painted, mainly landscapes. In 1935 he met Lisetta, his first girlfriend and future wife. In 1938 in Cortina d'Ampezzo he befriended the painter Domenico Mucci, who gave him painting lessons.

In 1941 Cavellini was conscripted in the Second World War, and was sent to an anti-aircraft base in Bergamo. On 11 August 1941 he married Lisetta, then was dismissed from the army because of a peptic ulcer. On 10 September 1942 his daughter Mariella was born, and then Cavellini went back to the army until the end of the war.

From 1945 to 1948 he drew and painted frequently. In the same period he visited the Feroldi collection, which included The Disquieting Muses by Giorgio de Chirico, the Lying Nude by Amedeo Modigliani, and works by Giorgio Morandi, Henri Rousseau, André Derain, Alfred Sisley and Paul Cézanne. He also visited Venice, where he painted landscapes, and Burano, where he met the painter Filippo De Pisis. At the Procuratie, in front of the Tempest by Giorgione, he met artist Emilio Vedova. Vedova proposed to organize an exhibition in Cavellini's house, with the help of painter Giuseppe Santomaso and art critics Giuseppe Marchiori and Marco Valsecchi.

=== The collector ===
The exhibition was successful, and many young artists contacted Cavellini to ask him to show their works. Among them was Renato Birolli, whom Cavellini befriended and from whom he acquired the 86 Drawings of the Resistance and the painting The Woman and the Moon. In December of the same year Birolli and Ennio Morlotti traveled to Paris on a scholarship of the French government. In June 1947 Cavellini met them in Paris with his wife, and there he visited the main museums of the city (the Louvre, the Petit Palais, the Jeu de Paume), the art galleries and the studios of artists Gino Severini, Óscar Domínguez, Édouard Pignon and Henry Adam. He was disheartened by the comparison to the great artists of the past and present, so he decided to abandon painting and work full-time on his commercial activity and on his collection.

In the same year he acquired two paintings by Renato Guttuso, and in March 1948 he traveled to Rome because one of his paintings was exhibited at the Rome Quadriennale in the National Gallery of Modern Art in Valle Giulia. There he met Guttuso, whom he befriended, and art critic and historian Lionello Venturi who had just returned to Italy after his exile during Fascism. Venturi recognized the importance of Cavellini's work and in 1953 published an article about him in the daily newspaper La Stampa. Because of his sudden popularity, Cavellini's father and brother, who was president of the chamber of commerce of the province of Brescia, asked him to avoid contact with artists because they were afraid they might be communists. Despite this Cavellini kept collecting art and visiting artists in Rome in the weekends, especially the home of Guttuso and his studio in the park of Villa Massimo. There he met the artists of the Group of Eight (Afro Basaldella, Antonio Corpora, Giulio Turcato, Alberto Burri, Corrado Cagli, Giuseppe Capogrossi, Pietro Consagra, Nino Franchina, Leoncillo Leonardi and Mimmo Rotella) and acquired many of their works, among them Sacco e nero 3 by Burri.

At the following Rome Quadriennale Cavellini bought numerous works by abstract artists like Franchina, Consagra, Corpora and Capogrossi. At the end of 1949, and then again in 1951, he traveled to Paris to acquire works by Hans Hartung, Maurice Estève, Alfred Manessier, Jean René Bazaine, Gustave Singier, Pierre Tal-Coat, Jean Le Moal, Léon Gischia and Gérard Ernest Schneider. Meanwhile, the family store enjoyed great success and expanded, changing its name from Bazar 33 to Grandi Magazzini 33. On 4 February 1946 Cavellini's son Piero was born. In 1950 his brother moved and he was left the entire family villa, which was restructured by architect Mario Baciocchi. Part of the house was transformed into a true art gallery, which was set up by graphic designer AG Fronzoni The house-gallery was inaugurated with the participation of seven artists from the Group of Eight, art critic Giuseppe Marchiori and writer Giancarlo Fusco. In the spring of the same year the gallery was also visited by Katherine Dunham and Josephine Baker.

In February 1953 Cavellini travels to Milan to meet Atanasio Soldati, the father of Italian abstract art, shortly before his death, and he acquired two of his paintings. He started to receive the interest of art critics and museum managers, meeting Lionello Venturi, Giulio Carlo Argan, the director of the Louvre, Georges Salles, and museologist Georges Henri Rivière. The magazine XX Siecle, edited by Gualtieri di San Lazzaro, published a long article about Cavellini written by professor Argan. In February 1954 Cavellini traveled to Paris where he met San Lazzaro, acquired paintings by Jean René Bazaine and Raoul Ubac and met Joan Miró and gallerist Aimé Maeght. With the help of San Lazzaro he bought a painting by Alberto Magnelli and 16 drawings by Jean Fautrier. Then he visited the studios of Gerard Ernest Schneider, Jean-Michel Atlan, Jean Dubuffet, Victor Brauner, Léon Gischia and André-Pojet. Thanks to Gildo Caputo, director of the Galerie de France, he was able to meet Alfred Manessier and acquire his work Ce qui était perdu. In Paris he met by chance Italian designer Bruno Munari. In 1955 Cavellini's gallery was visited by German art historian Werner Haftmann and by the founder of documenta Arnold Bode, who asked him to contribute to the exhibition. While in Kassel he bought a burning by Alberto Burri.

In the same year Cavellini's gallery was visited by art historians Vittorio Viale and Palma Bucarelli, and then by poets Eugenio Montale, Salvatore Quasimodo, Giuseppe Ungaretti, Beniamino Joppolo and French painter Maurice Estève. In January 1956 he went back to Paris where he met San Lazzaro and bought a painting by Serge Poliakoff. He also met Lucio Fontana in his studio in Milan and acquired from him one of his holes, a painting by Osvaldo Licini and one by Asger Jorn. In 1957 Palma Bucarelli asked Cavellini to exhibit at the National Gallery of Modern Art in Rome, which she managed. The exhibition, titled Modern Painters of the Cavellini Collection, consisted of 180 works and was inaugurated on 24 May 1957 at the presence of Italian Minister of Education Pietro Campilli. The exhibition received positive reviews from, among others, art critics Lionello Venturi, Giulio Carlo Argan, Giuseppe Marchiori and Guido Ballo, and also by Francesco Arcangeli, Attilio Bertolucci, Enrico Crispolti, Maurizio Calvesi and Alfredo Mezio. At the start of 1958 the exhibition moved to La Chaux-de-Fonds in Switzerland, then to Kunsthalle in Basel and finally to Germany at the Staatliche Kunsthalle in Baden-Baden and at the Landolins museum in Esslingen am Neckar.

=== Abstract Art and Man Painter ===
On 2 June 1958 Cavellini published his first book Arte astratta (Abstract Art), printed by Giampiero Giani and presented at the Venice Biennale. The book participated in the Viareggio Prize, reaching the final selection. Abstract Art was positively reviewed by Elda Fezzi, Guido Ballo, Giorgio Kaisserlian, Duilio Morosini, Angelo Dragone and Rosanna Apicella. Some pages of Cavellini's diary were published by Alfredo Mezio on the magazine Mondo, directed by Mario Pannunzio. In the summer of the same year he travelled to London with his daughter Mariella, and there he met painter John Latham and bought some of his works. In the same period he visited the exhibitions by Yves Klein at the Apollinaire Gallery in Milan, those by Arman and Shusaku Arakawa at the Arturo Schwarz Gallery in Milan, the group exhibitions by Luciano Pistoi and Michel Tapié in Turin and the ones set up by Attilio Codognato in Venice. At one of those exhibitions he met Christo, who then visited Cavellini's home.

On 31 May 1960, Cavellini published his second book Uomo pittore (Man Painter), which included his diary and his correspondence with Renato Birolli, who had died on 3 May 1959. In January 1961 Cavellini went back to Paris where he met Georges Mathieu, Jean Fautrier. On 16 and 23 April 1961 he published on L'Europeo his report of the two meetings. In Paris he also met Pierre Alechinsky, Philip Martin and Hisao Domoto. He was also visited in Brescia by Italian painter Tancredi Parmeggiani, who would commit suicide a few years later. In 1960 the Venice Biennale focused on arte informale, awarding Jean Fautrier and Hans Hartung. Cavellini visited the Biennale and met artists Renato Guttuso, Alberto Burri, Emilio Vedova and Luigi Nono.

=== The artist ===
In the summer of 1962 Cavellini decided to resume his activity as an artist, initially with dadaist works. He experimented with materials such as imprints of leaves, enamel, blotting paper, collages, toilet paper, razor blades. In 1965 he exhibited a dozen works at the Apollinaire Gallery in Milan. With the help of Giovanni Fiorini he created homages to Georges Braque, Henri Matisse, Giorgio Morandi, Joan Miró, Fernand Léger and Giorgio de Chirico. He also composed mosaics of painted wood, which he transformed in enormous stamps. Then he started to destroy his works, dissect them and put them in small caged. He also burned his works, creating the Carboni (Carbons), i.e. carbonizzate partly painted with bright colors.

At the 1964 Venice Biennale Cavellini made contact with pop art. In the same year the Comune of Brescia decided to exhibit the artworks it owned at the Gallery of Modern Art in Santa Giulia. Cavellini was asked to contribute with some works from his collection, and he deposited 70. The exhibition was inaugurated on 15 November 1964. The contract would last seven years, then Cavellini would take back the works because of poor storage conditions and the missing promotion on the part of the Comune. In October 1965 he travelled to Russia with his son Piero and numerous artists and prominent figures including the Soviet Minister of Culture Yekaterina Furtseva. In 1965 with the advent of arte povera Cavellini met Michelangelo Pistoletto and Giulio Paolini, and acquired works by Mario Merz, Giovanni Anselmo and Gilberto Zorio, and then Luciano Fabro, Piero Gilardi and Jannis Kounellis.

In this period Cavellini commissioned the first portraits of himself to authors Renato Birolli, Wolf Vostell, Mario Ceroli, Claudio Costa and Mimmo Rotella. Even American artist Andy Warhol went to Cavellini's house and made a portrait of him. James Collins made a video-portrait. They were followed by the French Bernar Venet and Ben Vautier, by the visual poets Emilio Villa, Ugo Carrega and Ketty La Rocca, and then by Claudio Parmiggiani, Aldo Spinelli, Michele Zaza, Fernando De Filippi, Adriano Altamira, Carlo Pittore and E.F. Higgins III. In 1966 Cavellini made his first trip to the United States, in the Greenwich Village neighbourhood of New York City, he made a performance by attaching hundreds of pins to his suit.

In 1967 his daughter Mariella was married, and for the occasion, Cavellini made an exhibition with works of Piero Gilardi, Arman, Allen Jones, Robert Rauschenberg, David Hockney, Alan Davie, Alberto Burri and Lucio Fontana. He was photographed with the artworks by Danilo Allegri. The following year he made an exhibition with his drawings in the Sturm Palace in Bassano del Grappa. For the first time some of his works, specifically a few of his Carboni, were bought by a collector. In 1970 he decided to promote his art through a series of exhibitions in Italy: first at the Toninelli Gallery in Milan, then in Como at the Salotto Gallery, then in Turin at the Triade Gallery, in Trieste at the Lanterna Gallery, in Florence at the Flori Gallery, and finally in Rome at the Toninelli Gallery. However, the exhibitions were not successful.

=== The autostoricizzazione ===
In 1971 Cavellini coined the term autostoricizzazione (self-historicization), upon which he acted to create a deliberate popular history through self-promotion. He made 16 Manifesti (Posters) for the exhibition that he imagined would take place in 2014 in the most important museums of the world to celebrate the centennial of his birth. In the same year he met Rina Majoli, director of the Cenobio-Visualità Gallery, who decided to exhibit the Posters. With the help of fellow artist Sarenco, Cavellini was able to repeat the exhibition at the Aktionsgalerie in Bern and then at the art fair in Basel, where he added some Carbons to the Posters. At the inauguration in Basel on 23 June 1972 there were no visitors. In this period Cavellini also created the first Francobolli (Stamps) that showed his portraits: first that by Mario Ceroli, then those by Mimmo Rotella, James Collins and Andy Warhol. He also made seven self-portraits which he transformed into stamps to celebrate his centennial, and he also exhibited them at the Segnapassi Gallery in Pesaro. He also created 25 covers for the books that the most important people of the past and present time would have written about him:

- Saint Augustine, The Confessions of Cavellini
- Dante Alighieri, The Divine Cavellini
- Giulio Carlo Argan, History of the Art of Cavellini
- Charles Baudelaire, Les fleurs du Cavellini
- Marcus Tullius Cicero, Orations for Cavellini
- Charles Darwin, The Evolution of Cavellini
- John the Evangelist, The Apocalypse of Cavellini
- Sigmund Freud, Psychopathology of the Life of Cavellini
- Galileo Galilei, Discourses on Cavellini
- Leonardo da Vinci, Treatise About the Painting of Cavellini
- Nikolai Lobachevsky, New Principles of Cavellini
- Immanuel Kant, Critique of Cavellinian Reason
- Niccolò Machiavelli, Prince Cavellini
- Mao Zedong, Pensieri di Cavellini
- Karl Marx, Il capitale di Cavellini
- Henry Miller, Tropic of Cavellini
- Molière, Imaginary Cavellini
- Friedrich Nietzsche, Thus Spoke Cavellini
- Omero, Odyssey of Cavellini
- Ovid, Metamorphosis of Cavellini
- Saint Paul, Letters to Cavellini
- Jean Paul Sartre, The Nausea of Cavellini
- William Shakespeare, Achille
- Giorgio Vasari, Life and Works of Cavellini

The 25 Books were exhibited in Milan at the Cenobio-Visualità Gallery at the beginning of 1973. Then Cavellini wrote an encyclopedia article dedicated to himself, telling his story until the year 2014. He translated the article into four languages and started writing it everywhere: on canvas, sheets, clothes, umbrellas, cardboard and so on. He also wrote it on a white linen suit, which he often wore. He also created 24 Letters written to him by Vincent van Gogh. In 1973 his works were exhibited at the Bertesca Gallery in Genoa, and then at Palazzo dei Diamanti in Ferrara. At this exhibition he met photographer Michelangelo Giuliani, who took pictures of him with the suit, the hat, the tie and the umbrella showing his story.

=== The Exhibitions at Home ===
At the end of 1973 Cavellini began making works of mail art with the 25 Letters, a letter of thanks to each one of the authors who had written books about him, with translations in English, French and Spanish. He printed a catalogue of the letters and mailed it to museum and gallery directors, art critics and the most famous artists. That was the first Mostra a domicilio (Exhibition at Home). In January 1974 he exhibited the 25 Books at the Cenobio-Visualità Gallery in Milan. Then he created the 25 Visits by famous historical figures, in which he was photographed wearing the suit with his story and a wooden helmet showing the name of the person. He also made new self-portraits, both drawn and photographic. One of them was composed of 330 pictures of his face, each showing a different expression.

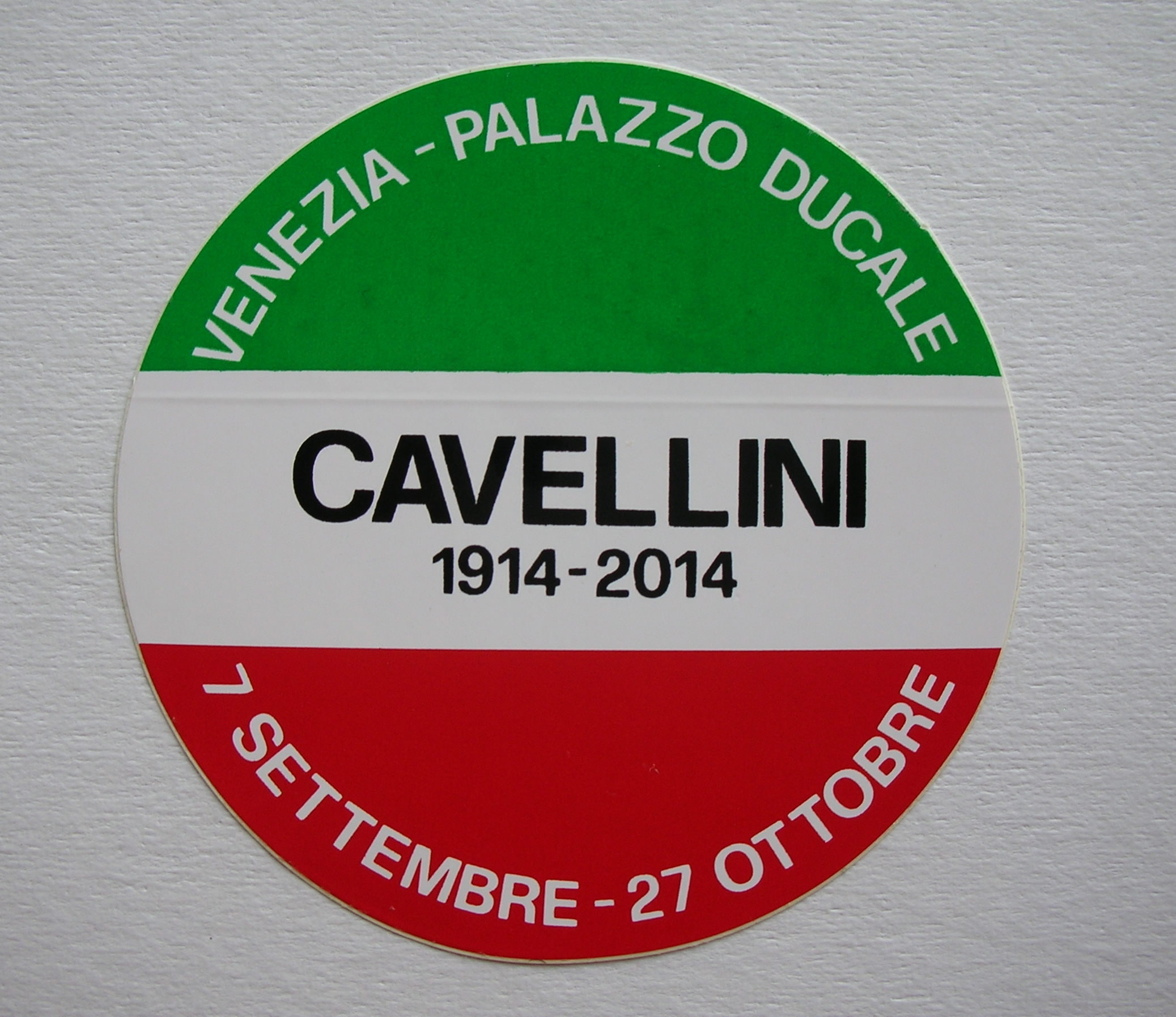
One of the famous "self-historicizing" works by Cavellini, for an imaginary exhibition at Doge's Palace in Venice for the centennial of his birth

Emilio Villa visited Cavellini in 1974 and convinced the Visual Arts Center of Naples to exhibit the 25 Letters, the exhibition was inaugurated on 10 October. Cavellini made a photomontage showing his exhibition at the Royal Palace of the city, and he used it as a postcard. The same he did with the Milan Cathedral, the Doge's Palace in Venice and the Palazzo dei Diamanti in Ferrara. He also printed circular stickers with the colours of the flag of Italy, promoting his imaginary exhibition in Venice. Since then he included the stickers in every work of mail art. At the end of 1974 Cavellini made a new "Exhibition at Home" titled Cimeli (Relics), which contained documents and photographs from his life. Through Corrado Cagli he met art critic Mario Verdone, who warned him that many Italian artists were criticizing his supposed arrogance. The Relics were praised by George Brecht, Ben Vautier and Marinus Boezem, and Genesis P-Orridge re-elaborated them to create a new work of art. In the same year Cavellini made a new postcard with his decalogue:

1. Do not self-historicize.
2. Do not make Posters and Stamps to celebrate your centennial.
3. Do not make Exhibitions at Home.
4. Do not burn, do not destroy, do not empty your failed works; do not propose them again; do not dissect those by famous artists.
5. Do not publish your book of Relics while alive.
6. Do not write letters of thanks to the great of all time who wrote a book about you.
7. Do not write letters to the famous artists of the past.
8. Do not make lists that include your movement among those that contributed to the renewal of modern art.
9. Do not expose banner of your celebrative exhibitions over the entrance of museums.
10. Do not publish your past, present and future story; do not write it everywhere (on personal clothes, the human body, fabrics, columns, etcetera).

=== Encounters/Clashes in the Jungle of Art ===
In 1975 Cavellini made a new Exhibition at Home with the Analogies: photographs of Vincent van Gogh and Marcel Duchamp, the encyclopedia entry about Michelangelo, the Last Supper by Leonardo da Vinci and then Robert Rauschenberg, Jackson Pollock, Vassily Kandinsky, Jean Dubuffet, Roy Lichtenstein, Claes Oldenburg, Mao Zedong, Richard Nixon, Andy Warhol, each one of them compared to equivalents about Cavellini. The young Marina Abramović shows interest in Cavellini's work, and Dutch journalist Ger Van Dyck published an interview of Cavellini together with those of Joseph Beuys, Jacobo Borges and Andy Warhol. The interview was made on 22 May 1975 and it was shown at the international videotape congress organized by the CAYC of Buenos Aires at Palazzo dei Diamanti in Ferrara by Argentine architect Jorge Glusberg. In the same year Cavellini published the book Encounters/Clashes in the Jungle of Art. He became interested in conceptual art (Allan Kaprow, Daniel Buren, Dennis Oppenheim, Joseph Kosuth, Dan Graham, Peter Hutchinson, Bill Beckley, Jean Le Gac), and in Milan he bought La déconstruction de l'art by Ben Vautier, a work composed of 167 different paintings. The work represented France at Europalia, an exhibition organized by the Royal Museum of Fine Arts of Belgium. Cavellini also visited Vautier in Nice, then went to Paris where he met Daniel Templon and Catherine Millet.

In 1975 Cavellini made a new self-portrait, a photomontage of himself on the throne of the Persian Shah, which he also used for a stamp. In September 1975 he exhibited his works twice in Brescia, first at the Banco Gallery and then at the Nuovi Strumenti Gallery managed by his son Piero. He was also invited at the Art Festival in Middelburg, Netherlands, and there he exhibited the 24 Letters written to him by Vincent van Gogh. He went to Middelburg with photographer Ken Damy, then the exhibition moved to Brussels and finally to Antwerp. In October 1975 he exhibited in Poland at the Współczesna Gallery of Warsaw and then at the Sztuki Współczesnej Gallery in Kraków. At the end of the year he wrote his story on a rag of cloth in eight languages. Ken Damy made a videotape in which his students got enveloped in the rag and took it around the streets of Brescia. Cavellini also wrote his story on the body of Marco Lucchetti, documenting his performance through photos and videos. Meanwhile, he also made another Exhibition at Home, writing 25 Letters to masters of painting including Cimabue, Piet Mondrian, Paul Cézanne, Vincent van Gogh and Paul Gauguin. The December 1975 edition of the Rizzoli-Larousse encyclopedia included an entry about Cavellini.

In 1976 Cavellini made a new Exhibition at Home, publishing his diary of the previous year. At the beginning of 1976 art critic Hans Mayer set up an exhibition about the artist in Düsseldorf, which was then replicated in Paris, Brussels and Basel. Luciano Inga Pin, director of the Diagramma Gallery of Milan, brought the Mayer exhibition into his gallery, and in this occasion Cavellini again wrote his story on the body of Marco Lucchetti, in front of critics Gillo Dorfles and Filiberto Menna. The Panorama magazine published a picture of Cavellini during the performance, then Paolo Mosca, director of the Italian edition of Playboy, decided to publish an interview of the artist and on that day Cavellini writes the story on the body of a Playboy model. He then mailed 200 copies of the magazine as a work of mail art. On 9 April 1976 he traveled to Belgrade, Serbia to participate in the inauguration of an exhibition at the Students' Cultural Center. In the same year he was also visited by Eugen Drăguţescu who was working for the Treccani encyclopedia.

In 1976 Cavellini managed to obtain a letter of invitation to the Venice Biennale and wrote his name in place of that of the artist, then mailed a letter to the president of the Biennale Commission Carlo Ripa di Meana declining the invitation because he disagreed with the way the event had been organized. The two letters were published on the April 1976 issue of Flash Art. The art book by Albert Skira published a picture of Marco Lucchetti wearing clothes with Cavellini's story written on them. Dutch magazine Miroir and German magazine Pardon published articles about him. Three new solo exhibitions were made in Poland, and one in the Netherlands, and Cavellini was also selected for numerous group exhibitions. He started to gain more popularity. He received a letter from Elke Koska and Ha Schult, German artists. Camillo Capolongo invited him to participate in an exhibition in Naples, Nola and Pomigliano, which was then replicated in Milan at the Castello Sforzesco. Art critic Sara Breitberg, working for the Tel Aviv Art Museum, published an article about Cavellini in an Israeli newspaper, and Orna Panfil from the University of Tel Aviv founded a Center for Cavellinian Research.

Italian artist Luciano Bartolini mailed Cavellini a map of Florence showing the road from his home to the Belvedere, during which he had read the 25 Letters. Then he sent him a blank book, and Cavellini replied by filling it with his stamps. This gave him the idea for a new series of works called Andata-ritorno ('Round Trip'), which he made with Bill Gaglione from San Francisco and then many other artists. Art magazines like Egozine, Onderlangs, Vile and Hid published articles about Cavellini, and the book Identität, Realität, Fiktion = Identité, réalité, fiction by Marie-Luise Schumacher, included pictures of the Venice Doge's Palace photomontage made by the artist, his Posters, his meeting with Andy Warhol and also his Last Supper. The Parachute Center for Cultural Affairs of Calgary, Alberta, Canada exhibited Cavellini's works. The Łódź Museum in Poland was the first to acquire one of his works. However, Cavellini enjoyed no success in Italy, for instance the critic Achille Bonito Oliva, who visited him with Giuseppe Recchia, did not show any interest in his art, and Filiberto Menna and Alberto Boatto judged him negatively. Disappointed, the artist prepared the stamp Nemo propheta in patria.

In 1976 Cavellini wrote to Willi Bongard, director of the Art Aktuell magazine, asking to be inserted at the head of a list of the best artists in the world, explaining that his latest Exhibitions at Home had been shown in 10,600 locations, including the most important museums in the world that tacitly accepted the catalogues. Not receiving any reply, he decided to publish the list himself. In February 1977 Franco Farina, director of Palazzo dei Diamanti in Ferrara, invited Cavellini to the inauguration of a space dedicated to the production of videotapes, performances and theatre. On 15 April Cavellini made a performance there. Then he participated in the art fairs of Bologna and Basel, and also in documenta in Kassel. Here he met Eberto Carboni, Judith Hoffberg, Gippo Toninelli and Willi Bongard. American magazines File and Art Rite published articles and photographs of him. He also sent his two living works, Pierangela Colosio and Marco Lucchetti, to Basel and Kassel. Meanwhile, he received many new works of mail art which he started collecting in a Cavellinian Museum.

=== Nemo propheta in patria ===
In 1976 Cavellini published a new catalog titled Nemo propheta in patria, printed 12,000 copies of it and mailed them around the world. He received requests for stickers from many foreign artists, including the Americans Buster Cleveland and Anna Banana, who put a photograph on him on her magazine Vile. The Canadian magazine Virus, the American Tabloid Art and Egozine, and also the German Haute Kunst published articles about him. Canadian artist Vincent Trasov visited Cavellini's home and shot a 19-minute video in which Cavellini made art performances with Colosio and Luchetti. The video was shown on Canadian television on 1 March 1978 and in the United States in September of the same year. On 15 October 1977 art critic Giuseppe Marchiori wrote a letter to Cavellini in which he called him "the most famous Italian artist in the world". However, the artist kept being ignored in Italy, as he was not present in the catalog of the Bologna art fair, he was not invited an important exhibition about Italian art from 1960 to 1977 at the Galleria Civica in Turin, and he was never listed in the Bolaffi Arte magazine.

In 1977 Italian journalist Romano Battaglia dedicated a chapter of his book Vivono fra noi (They Live Among Us), in which he presented a series of unusual people, to Cavellini. He also interviewed him on his television program TG L'una, and during the program Cavellini showed Battaglia his works and wrote on the bodies of Colosio and Luchetti. Marco Nozza published on Il Giorno the article "Cavellini teases people", confusing the two "living works" with Cavellini's children Mariella and Pietro. The Bolaffi National Catalog of Modern Art no. 14, edited by critics Renato Barilli, Carlo Bertelli, Maurizio Calvesi, Mario De Micheli, Giuseppe Marchiori and Nello Ponente, coordinated by Paolo Levi, made no mention of Cavellini. However, Sandra Orienti praised his book on Il Popolo, Luigi Serravalli wrote about it on Adige and Luciano Spiazzi did the same on Bresciaoggi. In an interview to Fotografia italiana in November 1977, Andy Warhol called Cavellini "my favorite Italian artist".

In 1977 Italian journalist Toti Carpentieri wrote about Cavellini in a newspaper published in Lecce, then interviewed him for the national television network RAI, asking him for a forecast on the following year's developments in art. Cavellini replied that art was dead and it was useless to make art in the traditional way, that Italy was a provincial nation and Italians were worthless pretentious people. The Gazzetta del lunedì newspaper published an article titled "The Extraordinary Cavellini". On 7 March 1978 the newspaper Il Lavoro published an article by art critic Germano Beringheli titled "Cavellini's Schizophrenia". Tullio Cicciarelli wrote an article titled "Writing on Oneself: Guglielmo Achille Cavellini or the Honesty of Fiction". In the same year Carlo Battisti, director of an advertising agency, founded in Viareggio the first Center for Cavellinian Studies. Sergio Colzani of the Incontro Gallery in Genoa set up a telephone exhibition of Cavellini, and journalist Francesco Vincitorio wrote about it on L'Espresso. Art critic Corrado Maltese, who taught history of art at the University of Genoa, brought his students to the exhibition and made a lesson about Cavellini. In April 1978 Maltese invited Cavellini to Genoa to meet his students.

On 3 September 1977 Cavellini, unsatisfied with his words from 1965–1970, burned 353 of them in the countryside near Brescia. Then he created a series of black-and-white stamps in which he wore his written clothes, on nine subjects chosen from photographs by Ken Damy. The Petri Gallery di Lund exhibited his catalogs. Cavellini also made new stickers with the image of the Uffizi in Florence, and the CSC of Viareggio made one about Palazzo Pitti. Then he received the visit of Corrado Maltese and Rossana Bossaglia with their students, and also Vittore Baroni. The designer Armando Testa sent him a work celebrating his genius. In 1978 he composed a portrait with photographs made by Paolo Gioli. He was also the subject of a mail art work by Plinio Mesciulam, and he replied with a Round Trip. On 15 October 1978 French artist Jean Dubuffet wrote a letter to him.

In 1979 Cavellini was again photographed by Ken Damy, first with Carnival masks and then fully covered with his stickers. He also created the postcard Ten Ways to Become Famous, that included the decalog:

1. Killing Cavellini, or being killed by Cavellini
2. Being part of the Cavellinian Museum
3. Exalting Cavellini's self-historicization
4. Wearing the coat and suit written by Cavellini
5. Having Cavellini write his story on your body
6. Organize a Center for Cavellinian Studies
7. Being commissioned with celebrating Cavellini's anniversary
8. Writing a book or an essay about Cavellini
9. Receiving by mail a "Round Trip" by Cavellini
10. Owning a work by Cavellini

After the publication of this new decalog Cavellini entertained exchanges of mail art with Theo West, Anna Banana and Miroslav Klivar. Banana visited his house in Brescia with her husband Bill Gaglione. Buster Cleveland filled the city of Ukiah, in California, with Cavellini's stickers. In 1978 Tiziano Marcheselli published an article on the Gazzetta di Parma in which he presented an iniziative for the beatification of Cavellini by the Center for Cavellinian Studies. Jolena Baldini wrote about Cavellini's artworks and performances on Paese Sera, noting the contrast between the artist's irony and the drama of the present times (anni di piombo, kidnapping of Aldo Moro). Cavellini was also featured in a chapter of the book Contemporary Artists, published in London in the same year. The Croatian magazine Podroom, the Hungarian Muveszet and the American Mamelle, edited by Judith Hoffberg, published articles about him. In 1978 Cavellini participated in the first big Italian exhibition of mail art in Mantua, in the house of Andrea Mantegna, with 140 artists from every corner of the world. Cavellini mailed his book Incontri/scontri nella giungla nell'arte to numerous artists and art critics, receiving positive feedback exclusively from outside of Italy.

In 1979 the Chamber of commerce of Carrara featured an exhibition with 123 works made by Cavellini in the previous 15 years. In the autumn of 1979 Cavellini mailed to 5,000 friends a form to request Cavellini's participation to the Venice Biennale of the following year. Ne invia 3000 alla Biennale ma non-riceve risposta. In 1980 he started to make paintings with dry leaves, glue, and photographs of himself. Graziano Origa, who had published an article about Cavellini published and interview with him in his magazine Artist. Cavellini mailed to 500 people a copy of the magazine containing the interview. He also made the inaugural exhibition at the Cinquetti Gallery in Verona by creating 43 portraits. The magazine Il Mondo included Cavellini in a list of 1,000 Italian artists, edited by Paolo Levi for Bolaffi Arte. American magazine Artnews in March 1981 described Cavellini as one of the most important artists of the contemporary Italian art scene. Yugoslav magazine HID wrote about him in December 1980. In 1979 he participated in the Parola–Immagine exhibition at the Rotonda della Besana in Milan. On 17 October 1979 Cavellini made performance in the Duomo square in Brescia with the Gruppo Alternativo from Salerno, headed by Beppe Rosamilia. They put Cavellini's posters on the pavement, set fire on them and covered them with salt, then they collected the ashes and lit candles in the Nuovi Strumenti Gallery, as an "artisti funeral".

Later Cavellini maile 400 authorizations to celebrate his centennial in 2014, and he created new stamps. He also wrote a Lettera of thanks to my enemies Then he made a new postcard with a photomontage showing Benito Mussolini, Adolf Hitler, Joseph Stalin, Vladimir Lenin, Mao Zedong, Karl Marx, Fidel Castro, Che Guevara, Francisco Franco and other historical figures, and a plea to avoid a nuclear war that could destroy his important artworks. Enrico Crispolti and Franco Summa set up in Pescara an exhibition titled Postal Medium containing works by Cavellini, Basilio Cascella and other mail artists. In Pescara Cavellini made a new writing performance on some panels and on the body of Gianni Romeo. In March 1980 the artist Galeazzo Nardini invited Cavellini at a convention in Montecatini Terme titled Critica 1 – L'arte da chi a chi, directed by Gillo Dorfles with the participation of Christo, Daniel Buren, Andy Warhol, Pierre Restany, Giuseppe Chiari and Fabio Mauri. Umberto Eco, Flavio Caroli, Eugenio Battisti, Lucia Marcucci, Claudio Costa, Maurizio Calvesi and Michael Pergolani were also present. The Naples Alternative Group made a performance to celebrate Cavellini, and the artist wrote on the body of Mariella Valenti.

=== The United States and Japan ===
From 6 April to 30 May 1980 Ukiah, California hosted the Inter Dada 80 festival. Artists Anna Banana, Judith Hoffberg and Buster Cleveland made a parade in honor of Cavellini and invited him to the United States. Hoffberg published a picture of Cavellini on the cover of her magazine Umbrella. On 28 April the artist took a flight from Linate to San Francisco with photographer Ken Damy. Upon arrival he was interviewed by Video Free America and Target Video. In the Target interview Cavellini said he was not a dadaist and distanced himself from Fluxus. On 1 May he arrived in Ukiah, and on 3 May there was a huge parade in his honor. Then he visited the Orange County Museum of Art, the Museum of Contemporary Art San Diego, the University of San Diego and Disneyland. Local artist made a performance called Eating Cavellini, in which they swallowed fragments of Cavellini's posters. On 10 May there was a new parade in his honor. Then the artist moved to Budapest, Hungary, where György Galántai had organized and exhibition of his works.

Vittore Baroni published an issue of his magazine Arte postale! solely about Cavellini. German magazines Art and Frankfurter Idee, the American Boulevards and Slick and the Swiss DU published articles about him. Canadian magazine Fuse criticized him with an article by Ken Friedman, member of Fluxus. Cavellini made a new Exhibition at Home titled Cavellini in California and Budapest. Then the documentary Cavellini in California was published. On 24 March 1981 Cavellini's wife Lisetta died. The artist made some new Relics using some of his wife's personal belongings: belts, umbrellas, bags, gloves, hats... In the same year he made a new Exhibition at Home, titled Self-Portraits. In June 1981 Emilio Villa visited him in Brescia and informed him that he was readying and essay about self-historicization. In the summer of 1981 Cavellini traveled to Paris and visited the Jeu de Paume and the Beaubourg. Tommaso Trini published an article about Cavellini on the Panorama magazine. In October 1981 he was invited to exhibit his work at the São Paulo Art Biennial. There he met Urs Fischer, Georg Karl Pfahler, Pierre Restany, Antonio Dias and Roberto Moriconi.

In 1982 Buster Cleveland and Diana Siprelle went to documenta in Kassel and pasted Cavellini's stickers everywhere. The same happened in Venice outside of the Biennale. In the same year Cavellini shot the video The Day of a Genius, showing his daily activities of self-historicization. In 1982 he participated in Artexpo in Brescia with a hundred works. On 2 October 1982 he went to New York City, where the following day he met Ray Johnson, the father of mail art. In New York he was also covered in stickers by his fans and then painted in green, white and red. On 8 October 1982 the Store Upstairs gallery inaugurated an exhibition of his works. Later that year he participated in the Festa dell'Unità in Mantua and in Arte Expo in Bologna. In September 1983 he partecipad again in Arte Expo with works from the Cavellinian Museum.

In 1978 Cavellini named Fausto Paci, former mayor of Porto San Giorgio, as his ambassador. In the 1980s Cavellini was published in Who's Who by Marquis, but they mistook his invented autobiography for truth. In the summer of 1984 Belgian artist Guy Bleus, director of the Administration Center in Wellen, organized a festival in his honor in Brussels, close to the European Elections. There he was proclaimed President of the United States of Europe. On 7 February 1984 his family's business, Magazzini 33, closed down. The Modern Realism gallery in Dallas organized an exhibition of his works, and in Italy Enzo Rossi Roiss made one at the Centro Nucleo Arte in Bologna. Roiss asked Cavellini to create a homage to Giorgio Morandi for the 20th anniversary of his death. For an exhibition of sacred art in Pescara Cavellini made a crucifix with his laughing head in place of Jesus Christ's. For the third edition of Artexpo he created a new and bigger crucifix, inspired by a work by Cimabue.

From 2 to 9 September 1984 there was a new dada festival in San Francisco, called Inter Dada 84. Cavellini was again asked by artist organizer Ginny Lloyd to participate, (in 1981 she had visited him at his home in Brescia) so he traveled to the United States and made a performance writing on the body of fellow artist Eva Lake. On the stage of the Victoria Theatre he asked the audience to write on his own body. In October 1984 Cavellini exhibited in Milan at the Ken Damy Photogallery a series of 20 self-portraits, and in the following spring there was a new exhibition in Turin at the Hovara Arte Gallery. Cavellini's last trip was to Japan: on 3 December 1985 artist Shozo Shimamoto visited him in Brescia and told him that he would organize exhibitions in Kyoto in July 1986, in Osaka in October, and then in Tokyo in January 1987. On 7 October 1986 Cavellini landed in Osaka and in the following days he made numerous performances, among them the writing on the naked head of Shimamoto in the Shitennō-ji temple. In 1987 Cavellini made his last Exhibition at Home. In July Rai Uno aired a documentary about him, directed by Mario Carbone. In 1989 Cavellini published his autobiography Life of a Genius. In his last exhibition in 1989 he showed many new Stamps. On 20 November 1990 he died in Brescia after a long illness.

=== After Cavellini's death ===
Starting in 1991 the Ken Damy Museum in Brescia hosts a different Cavellini exhibition each year. There were numerous retrospectives in Italy and elsewhere, for instance in 2008 at the Florence Lynch Gallery di New York, in 2013 in the Santa Giulia Museum in Brescia as part of Novecento mai visto, curated by Elena Lucchesi Ragni, Paolo Bolpagni, Enrico De Pascale and Maurizio Mondini, then again in New York at the Lynch Tham gallery. In 2008 Monia Marchionni published the book The self-historicization of Guglielmo Achille Cavellini, analyzing Cavellini's art and history. In 2014, for the centennial of Cavellini's birth, there were exhibitions of Cavellini's artworks at the Italian Institute of Culture in San Francisco and at the Ludwig Museum in Budapest. On 11 September 2014 the Spazio Contemporanea in Brescia hosted the official celebrations for the centennial. From 5 October to 6 January 2015 the Museum of Modern and Contemporary Art of Trento and Rovereto will hosted the exhibition Propheta in patria. Cavellini 1914–2014, showing the 16 Manifesti del centenario, the portraits of Cavellini by Andy Warhol, Mario Ceroli and Renato Birolli, art books and ephemera. In 2014, performance artist Mark Bloch curated in New York City, a Cavellini festival celebrating the centenary of his frequent mail art correspondent that culminated in an event at New York's Museum of Modern Art, fulfilling Cavellini's 1970s prophecy via poster. At various venues around Manhattan including the MoMA Library, Richard L. Feigen & Co., Lynch Tham, and the Whitebox Art Center, Bloch hosted exhibitions, mail art shows, performances, spoken word events and music including a 55-foot long wall covered with artworks from the mail art network and a 14 by 14-foot drawing of Cavellini by Bloch at Whitebox Art Center on the Lower East Side. Bloch had met Cavellini in New York in 1982 and in California at both the Interdada 80 and Interdada 84 celebrations.

== Authored works ==
- Arte astratta. Milan: Edizioni della Conchiglia. 1959.
- Uomo pittore. Milan: Edizioni della Conchiglia. 1960.
- Diario di Guglielmo Achille Cavellini. 1975.
- Incontri/scontri nella giungla dell'arte. Brescia: Shakespeare & Company. 1977.
- Vita di un genio. Brescia: Centro Studi Cavelliniani. 1989.

== Exhibitions at home ==
- 25 lettere. Brescia: Edizioni Nuovi Strumenti. 1974.
- Cimeli. Brescia: Edizioni Nuovi Strumenti. 1974.
- Analogie. Brescia: Edizioni Nuovi Strumenti. 1975.
- 25 quadri della collezione Cavellini. Brescia: Edizioni Nuovi Strumenti. 1976.
- Nemo propheta in patria. Brescia: Edizioni Nuovi Strumenti. 1978.
- Cavellini in California e a Budapest. 1980.
- Autoritratti – Self portraits. Brescia. 1981.
- Il sistema mi ha messo in croce. Turin: Stige. 1986.
- Serie artisti anomali. Cavellini-Arcimboldo. 1987.

== Solo exhibitions ==
- 1965, Galleria Apollinaire, Milan, Italy
- 1970, Galleria Toninelli, Milan, Italy
- 1971, Galleria Il Salotto, Como, Italy
- 1971, Galleria Toninelli, Rome, Italy
- 1971, Galleria Flori, Florence, Italy
- 1971, Galleria Triade, Turin, Italy
- 1972, Galleria La Lanterna, Trieste, Italy
- 1972, Galleria Cenobio-Visualità, Milan, Italy
- 1972, Aktions Galerie, Bern, Switzerland
- 1972, KataKombe Galerie, Basel, Switzerland
- 1972, Galerie Impact, Lausanne, Switzerland
- 1973, Galleria Cenobio-Visualità, Milan, Italy
- 1973, Galleria La Bertesca, Genova, Italy
- 1973, Palazzo dei Diamanti, Ferrara, Italy
- 1974, Agora Studio, Maastricht, Netherlands
- 1974, Visual Art Center, Naples, Italy
- 1975, Galleria Banco, Brescia, Italy
- 1975, Galleria Nuovi Strumenti, Brescia, Italy
- 1975, Galeria Współczesna, Warsaw, Poland
- 1975, Galeria Sztuki Współczesnej, Kraków, Poland
- 1976, Galeria Sztukildk, Lublin, Poland
- 1976, Studentski Kulturni Centra, Belgrade, Serbia
- 1976, Studio De Ambrogi, Milan, Italy
- 1976, Salon Empik Koszalin, Koszalin, Poland
- 1976, Galeria Nova, Zagabria, Croatia
- 1976, Galeria Pryzmat, Kraków, Poland
- 1977, Galleria La Nuova Città, Brescia, Italy
- 1977, Parachute Center, Calgary, Alberta, Canada
- 1977, Western Front, Vancouver, British Columbia, Canada
- 1977, Galeria Łódź, Łódź, Poland
- 1977, Galerie S.T. Petri, Lund, Sweden
- 1978, Center Spinnerel, Nussbaumen, Switzerland
- 1979, Galleria Unde?, Turin, Italy
- 1979, Camera di Commercio, Carrara, Italy
- 1979, Galeria Jatki, Wroclaw, Poland
- 1981, Galleria Cinquetti, Verona, Italy
- 1983, Ingeborg Hiel, Graz, Austria
- 1983, Gallery 360°, Tokyo, Japan
- 1984, Modern Realism Presents, Dallas, United States
- 1984, Nucleo Arte, Bologna, Italy
- 1985, Ken Damy Photogallery, Milan, Italy
- 1985, Galerie Prutt, Minden, Germany
- 1986, Galleria Hovara Arte, Turin, Italy
- 1986, Magazzini Kintetsu, Osaka, Japan
- 1986, Gallery 360°, Tokyo, Japan
- 1987, Metropolitan Museum, Tokyo, Japan
- 1988, Galerie M, Wilhelmshaven, Germany
- 1990, Galleria Piero Cavellini, Brescia, Italy
- 1990, Artestudio, Pontenossa, Italy
- 1991, Galerie Air de Paris, Nice, France
- 1991, Sala Estense, Carpi, Italy
- 1991, Ken Damy Museum, Brescia, Italy
- 1992, Espace, Turin, Italy
- 1992, Ken Damy Museum, Brescia, Italy
- 1993, Mudima Foundation, Milan, Italy
- 1993, Musei Civici, Rimini, Italy
- 1993, Ken Damy Museum, Brescia, Italy
- 1993, Carmine Church, Brescia, Italy
- 1993, Andy Warhol Museum, Medzilaborce, Slovakia
- 1993, Saletta Grifl, Cairo Montenotte, Italy
- 1994, Slovenska Vytarna Unia, Bratislava, Slovakia
- 1994, Ken Damy Museum, Brescia, Italy
- 1994, Palazzo Civico, Sirmione, Italy
- 1995, Sala Laurana, Pesaro, Italy
- 1995, Ken Damy Museum, Brescia, Italy
- 1995, Stamp Art Gallery, San Francisco, United States
- 1996, Cavellini Archive, Brescia, Italy
- 1996, Ken Damy Museum, Brescia, Italy
- 1997, Sarenco Club Art Gallery, Verona, Italy
- 1997, Passage Ierimonti, Milan, Italy
- 1997, Ken Damy Museum, Brescia, Italy
- 1998, Wella Italia, Castiglione delle Stiviere, Italy
- 1998, Di là dal fiume tra gli alberi, Concesio, Italy
- 1998, Ken Damy Museum, Brescia, Italy
- 1998, Expo Arte, Montichiari, Italy
- 1998, Teatro Nuovo Giovanni da Udine, Udine, Italy
- 1999, Sala delle Colonne, Botticino, Italy
- 1999, Galleria Spaziotemporaneo, Milan, Italy
- 1999, Palazzo dei Congressi, Cavalese, Italy
- 1999, Ken Damy Museum, Brescia, Italy
- 1999, Galleria Peccolo, Livorno, Italy
- 2000, Comune of Cormons, Italy
- 2000, Comune of Volta Mantovana, Italy
- 2000, Castle of Rivara, Italy
- 2000, Elementary School of Calcinatello, Italy
- 2000, Ken Damy Museum, Brescia, Italy
- 2000, Cavellini Archive, Brescia, Italy
- 2001, Villa Glisenti e Villa Carcina, Brescia, Italy
- 2001, Italian Institute of Culture, Praga, Czech Republic
- 2002, Galleria Fabbrica Eos, Milan, Italy
- 2002, Ken Damy Museum, Brescia, Italy
- 2003, Ken Damy Museum, Brescia, Italy
- 2004, Palazzo Comunale, Volta Mantovana, Italy
- 2004, Ken Damy Museum, Brescia, Italy
- 2005, Remo Bianco Museum, Monticelli Brusati, Italy
- 2005, Ken Damy Museum, Brescia, Italy
- 2006, Galleria Orler, Cortina d'Ampezzo, Italy
- 2006, Ken Damy Museum, Brescia, Italy
- 2007, Ken Damy Museum, Brescia, Italy
- 2007, Show Room Artetivù, Marcon, Italy
- 2008, Ar. Ri. Vi, Rome, Italy
- 2008, Florence Lynch Gallery, New York, United States
- 2014, Ruffilli Library, Roma, Italy
- 2014, Italian Institute of Culture, San Francisco, United States
- 2014, Ludwig Museum, Budapest, Hungary
- 2014, Mart, Rovereto, Italy

== Bibliography ==
- Romano Battaglia (1977). Vivono fra noi (in Italian). Rizzoli.
- Palma Bucarelli; Giovanni Carandente, eds. (1957). Pittori moderni dalla collezione Cavellini: Roma, maggio-luglio 1957 (in Italian). Rome: Editalia.
- Guglielmo Achille Cavellini (1959). Arte astratta (in Italian). Milan: Edizioni della Conchiglia.
- Guglielmo Achille Cavellini (1960). Uomo pittore (in Italian). Milan: Edizioni della Conchiglia.
- Guglielmo Achille Cavellini (1975). Diario di Guglielmo Achille Cavellini (in Italian).
- Guglielmo Achille Cavellini (1977). Incontri/scontri nella giungla dell'arte (in Italian). Brescia: Shakespeare & Company.
- Guglielmo Achille Cavellini (1989). Vita di un genio (in Italian). Brescia: Centro Studi Cavelliniani.
- Leo Strozzieri (1995). Guglielmo Achille Cavellini: oltre il tempo (in Italian). Brescia: Nuovi Strumenti.
- Monia Marchionni (2008). L'autostoricizzazione di Guglielmo Achille Cavellini. Idea di un Museo dal suo presente al nostro futuro (in Italian). Grafiche Fioroni.
- William Nessuno; Antonio Saccoccio; Piero Cavellini (2013). Cavellini dixit. Intervista all'inventore dell'autostoricizzazione (in Italian). Avanguardia 21. ISBN 9788898298006.
- Fotografia italiana (in Italian). Bologna: Skema. 1975.
- 25 lettere (in Italian). Brescia: Edizioni Nuovi Strumenti. 1974.
- 25 quadri della collezione Cavellini (in Italian). Brescia: Edizioni Nuovi Strumenti. 1976.
- Analogie (in Italian). Brescia: Edizioni Nuovi Strumenti. 1975.
- Attrezzi per la storia dell'arte. Guglielmo Achille Cavellini: opere 1965–1990 (in Italian). Brescia: Nuovi Strumenti. 2000.
- Autoritratti – Self portraits (in Italian). Brescia. 1981.
- Cavellini in California e a Budapest (in Italian). 1980.
- Cimeli (in Italian). Brescia: Edizioni Nuovi Strumenti. 1974.
- Il sistema mi ha messo in croce (in Italian). Turin: Stige. 1986.
- Nemo propheta in patria (in Italian). Brescia: Edizioni Nuovi Strumenti. 1978.
- Serie artisti anomali. Cavellini-Arcimboldo (in Italian). 1987.

== See also ==
- Abstract art
- Body art
- Neo-Dada
- Mail art
- Performance art
