= Applicat-Prazan =

Gallery located in Paris

Applicat-Prazan gallery was established in 1993 on the Left Bank in the Saint-Germain-des-Prés area of Paris at 16 rue de Seine (75006 Paris, France) under the initiative of Bernard Prazan, a keen art collector.

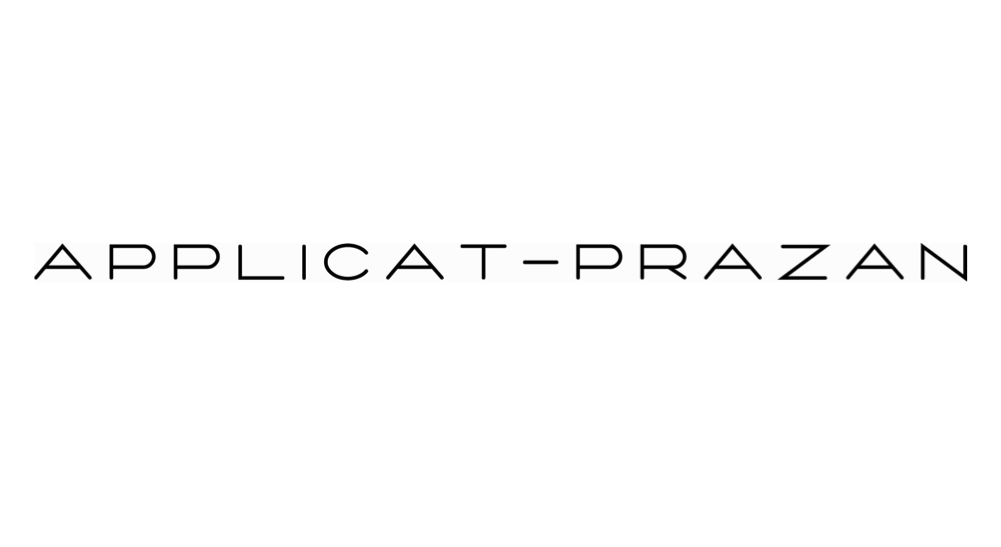
Logo Applicat-Prazan

Franck Prazan, Bernard Prazan's son and former managing director of Christie's in France, has been running the gallery since 2004.

In 2010 a second location was added on the Right Bank, at 14 avenue Matignon, 75008 Paris.

In 2023 on the occasion of its 30th anniversary Applicat-Prazan presented at the second edition of Paris + by Art Basel a Solo Show dedicated to French artist Jean Hélion, bringing together seven paintings of remarkable importance.

Since its foundation the gallery specializes exclusively in the important post-war European painters and specifically in the most significant artists of this period such as : Jean Dubuffet, Maurice Estève, Jean Fautrier, Hans Hartung, Jean Hélion, Wifredo Lam, Alberto Magnelli, Alfred Manessier, André Masson, Georges Mathieu, Serge Poliakoff, Jean-Paul Riopelle, Pierre Soulages, Nicolas de Staël, Maria Elena Vieira da Silva and Zao Wou-Ki.

== Exhibitions ==
Over the years the gallery has gained a large international recognition, thanks to its monographic or thematic exhibitions, notably:

- Soulages, major works (1996)
- Great painters, small paintings (1999)
- The School of Paris of the 50s in the year 2000 (2000)
- Schneider (2001)
- Estève, Freundlich, Poliakoff : Three masters of colours (2001)
- Estève, watercolours and charcoal (2003)
- Schneider (2006)
- Mes années 50, the collection of Alain Delon (2007)
- Présence, Silences, homage to Geer van Velde (2007)
- Poliakoff (2008)
- Atlan (2008)
- Dialogues around Pierre Soulages (2009)
- Atlan, the distempers (2010)
- Pincemin (2010)
- Jean Fautrier (2010)
- 14 Matignon (2011)
- André Masson (2012)
- Alfred Manessier, Tours, Favellas and other monumental paintings (2012)
- Maurice Estève, works on paper (2013)
- Serge Poliakoff, the gallery's 20th anniversary exhibition (2013)
- Georges Mathieu (2014)
- Maurice Estève, Paintings 1929-1994 (2015)
- Zoran Music (2016)
- Le grand Œil de Michel Tapié (2018)
- Justice! 2 chefs-d’œuvre de Roger-Edgar Gillet (2019)
- BBB (2019)
- Georges Mathieu, Paintings 1951-1962 (2022)
- Jean Hélion, le Florilège (2023)
- Camille Bryen, aux racines de l'informel (2024)
- Gérard Schneider (2025)

== Events ==
The gallery regularly participates in the following events:

- artgenève
- TEFAF Maastricht
- TEFAF New York Spring
- Art Basel
- Paris + by Art Basel
- Fine Arts Paris & La Biennale

In 2016, Applicat-Prazan participated in Art Basel Hong Kong for the second time. The gallery showed a majority of works by Zao Wou-Ki.

In 2017, Applicat-Prazan has been selected to sell two paintings on behalf of the Museum of Modern Art, New York (MoMA)

== Organisations ==
The gallery is a member of the following organization:

- Comité Professionnel des Galeries d’Art
