= Selene Preciado =

American art curator

Selene Preciado is an art curator and expert in Latin American art who is based out of the Greater Los Angeles area.

== Biography ==
Selene Preciado was born in 1982 in Tijuana, Mexico. She currently lives in Long Beach, California.

Preciado focuses on Latin American art. Preciado and Richard Montoya (the son of José Montoya) co-curated “José Montoya’s Abundant Harvest," a survey of over 2000 of Montoya's works on paper, at the Fowler Museum at the University of California, Los Angeles. She and Idurre Alonso co-curated the inaugural presentation “Customizing Language” at the Los Angeles Contemporary Exhibitions, which examines the relationship between language and political power. She and Alma Ruiz organized the Japanese art exhibition "Gas Giant" by Jacob Hashimoto at MOCA Pacific Design Center. With Cecilia Fajardo-Hill, she co-curated XicanXperimental Body, a multidisciplinary exploration of Chicanx art from the 1970s through the present, organized by the Phoenix Art Museum. It will open at the Pérez Art Museum Miami in 2021.

Preciado works as a program assistant and spokesperson at the Getty Foundation. Preciado was a part of their $16 million 'Pacific Standard Time: LA / LA' initiative. She has also been a curator at the Museum of Latin American Art and the San Diego Museum of Art.
