= Jin Jifa =

- Born: 金紀發 Jin Jifa; 1943 (age 82–83); Shanghai, China
- Known for: Oil Painting
- Movement: Abstract art

Jin Jifa (Chinese: 金紀發; born 1943), also known as Jin Ji (金己), is a Chinese painter and contemporary artist, known predominantly for his colorful abstract works, with rich texture, geometrically transposed, vividly depicting still objects, mostly flowers in vase, or country side landscape in China;

Jin is a member of Chinese Association of Artists since 1997, and he retired from the lectureship at Department of Arts, Shanghai University in 2005. Jin is a committee member of Shanghai Association of Artists. He continues to create works with different composition of colors in abstract form. Jin currently lives and works in Shanghai, China.

== Biography ==
Jin Jifa was born in Shanghai. He attended Shanghai College of Arts in 1961, and concentrated on oil painting, and after graduation, Jin worked for a Shanghai publisher in charge of creative production, making propaganda posters during that time; those early designed posters designed by Jin Jifa, mostly associated with political propaganda, are collected extensively by a sinology scholar Landsberger, Stefan R.

In 1984, Jin obtained his lectureship at Department of Art, at Shanghai University, and he continued teaching oil painting till his official retirement in 2005. He has held many solo or group exhibitions in China or overseas. Jin's works received recognition from commercial galleries as well as auction houses.

In 2005, Jin's oil painting, Color Movement No. 4, received the Judge's prize at Shanghai Annual Art Exhibition. Jin's works are collected by Shanghai Art Museum.

== Style ==
Jin's works deal with geometric structure of light, space and plane; color patches are used in layers to create the depth of viewing. Looking from the distance, those color compositions, abstractly displayed with randomness in flow, deliver a vivid image of objects depicted by the artist. Jin plays humorously with space and time to trigger a new way to see oil painting. Noted that, his works, Color Movement Series, conveys strongly a sense of surrealism and romanticism; melody from the heart is sung by the artist's interpretation of impermanence in nature and in life, and resemble in some way works by Nicolas de Staël, a painter known for his use of a thick impasto and his highly abstract landscape painting; Jing's formation of structure may be associated with Serge Poliakoff. Philosophically pondered, Jin's artistic force comes from his endless efforts in dealing with free-spirited flow of colors arrangement, and continues to inspire an infinity of seeing and feeling from a viewer's state of mind.

== Exhibitions ==
Jin's works have appeared in solo or group exhibitions. His works were shown at 15th China Shanghai Art Festival, Shanghai (2012); Jin's large oil painting, 《Melody from the heart》, was invited to be shown in the group show at National Arts Exhibition; Jin's work《Water country》was shown at Horizon Art Exhibition, China in 2004; in 2005, Jin participated in the Second Beijing International Art Biennale, China. 2012 Group show in Shanghai. Jin's works are in permanent collection of Shanghai Art Museum, and also in private collections in China, Singapore, Hong Kong, and Taiwan.

== See also ==
- Tachisme
- Lyrical Abstraction
