= Nemo propheta in patria =

Nemo propheta in patria, a Latin phrase meaning "no man is a prophet in his own land", may refer to:

- Nemo propheta in patria (sua), a concept present in all four Gospels
- Nemo propheta in patria, a catalog published in 1976 by Guglielmo Achille Cavellini
