= Alma Ruiz =

Guatemalan-American art curator

- Born: Guatemala
- Education: University of Southern California, Middlebury College, Università di Firenze
- Known for: Curation
- Movement: Contemporary art, Abstract art, Latin American art

Alma Ruiz is a curator, best known as a longtime, former senior curator at the Museum of Contemporary Art, Los Angeles (MOCA).

== Early life and education ==
Alma Ruiz was born and raised in Guatemala. At 19, she moved to Los Angeles to join her mother and brother, initially enrolling at Los Angeles City College, then transferring to the University of Southern California where she graduated with a degree in art history. She then pursued a graduate degree in Italian Language and Literature from the Middlebury College and Università di Firenze.

== Career and work ==
After earning her degree, Ruiz worked in Florence until 1982, then returned to Los Angeles and joined MOCA, initially as executive assistant to director Richard Koshalek. In 1989 she became exhibitions director at MOCA.

Ruiz's curatorial work focused on exhibitions of postwar artists, with an emphasis on emerging and Latin American artists. In 2016, she curated the 20 Bienal de Arte Paiz in Guatemala City.

=== Reception ===
Her curated exhibitions have received numerous positive reviews. Recently, art critics Hunter Drohojowska-Philp and Edward Goldman praised her work for the solo exhibition of Magdalena Fernández at MOCA Pacific Design Center.

=== Exhibitions ===
Selected curation for the Museum of Contemporary Art Los Angeles:

- Jacob Hashimoto: Gas Giant (2014)
- Cinema Vezzoli (2012)
- Suprasensorial: Experiments in Light, Color, and Space (2010)
- Poetics of the Handmade (2007)
- Gabriel Orozco (2000)
- The Experimental Exercise of Freedom: Lygia Clark, Gego, Mathias Goeritz, Hélio Oiticica, and Mira Schendel (1999)

Additional exhibitions by Artists:

- Magdalena Fernández
- Ernesto Neto
- William Kentridge
- Ana Mendieta
- Carlos Garaicoa
- Piero Manzoni
- Ad Reinhardt

=== Publications ===
- Suprasensorial: Experiments in Light, Color, and Space, Published by the Museum of Contemporary Art, 2012. (editing and text)
- Alexandra Grant, Published by the Museum of Contemporary Art. (editing)
- Poetics of the Handmade, Published by The Museum of Contemporary Art, Los Angeles, 2007. (text)
- Damián Ortega: The Beetle and Other Works, Published by California Institute of the Arts/Redcat, 2006. (essay)
- The Experimental Exercise of Freedom: Lygia Clark, Gego, Mathias Goeritz, Helio Oiticica, Published by The Museum of Contemporary Art, Los Angeles, 2000. (contribution)
