= Bryen =

Bryen is a surname. Notable people with the surname include:

- Camille Bryen (1907–1977), French poet, painter and engraver
- Keith Bryen (1927–2013), Australian motorcycle racer

== See also ==
- Bryan (disambiguation)
