= Magdalena Fernández =

Venezuelan artist (born 1964)

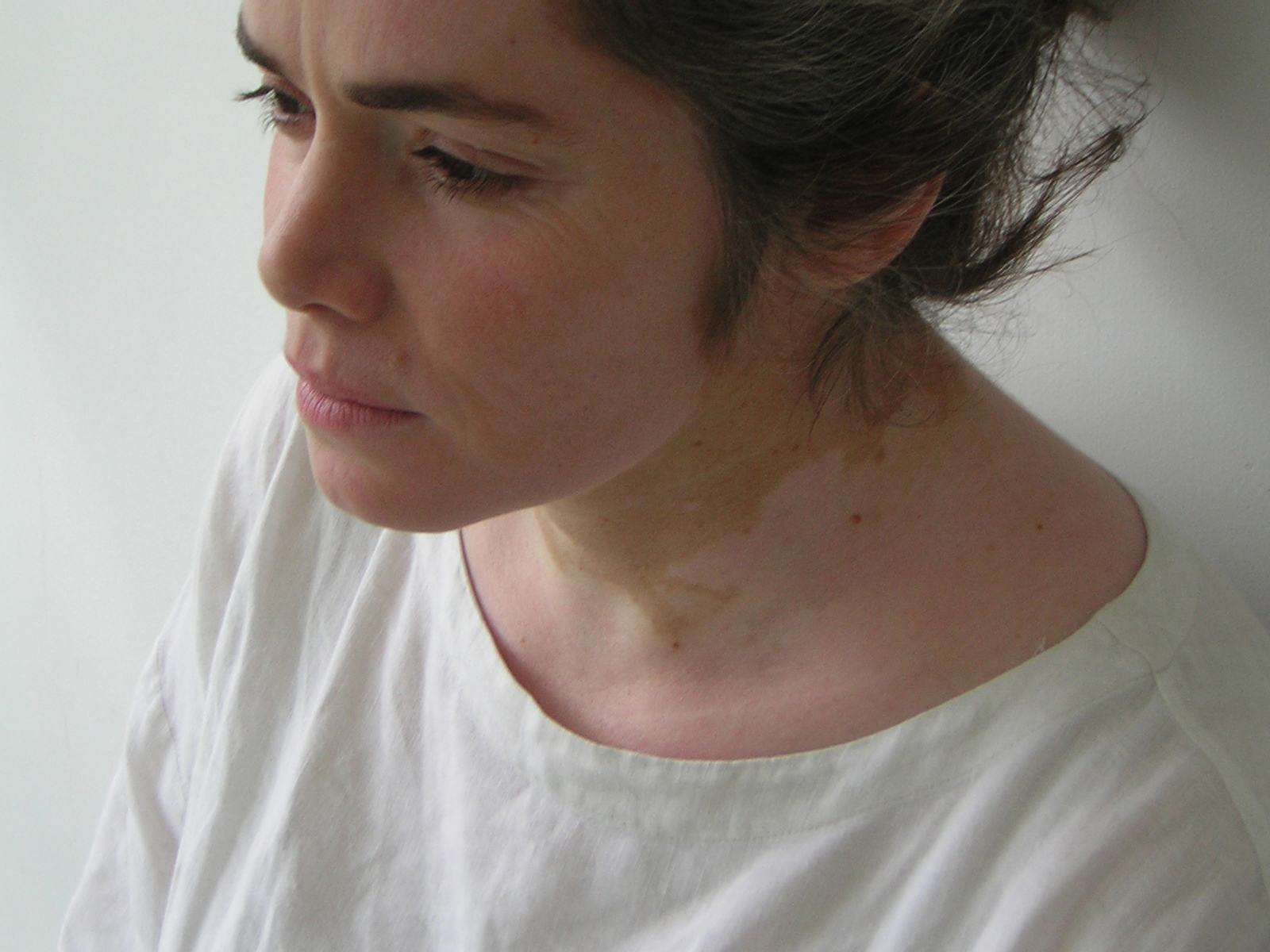
- Born: 1964 (age 61–62); Caracas, Venezuela
- Education: Boston University, Andrés Bello Catholic University, Neumann Institute of Caracas
- Known for: her work with light, sound, and abstractions of nature

Magdalena Fernández (born in 1964) is a Venezuelan installation and media artist known for her work with light, sound, and abstractions of nature. Her work has been exhibited internationally at the Venice Biennale, the Museum of Contemporary Art, Los Angeles, and the Museum of Fine Arts, Houston.

== Biography ==
Fernández was born in Caracas, Venezuela in 1964. She currently lives and works in Caracas. In 1982 she studied Graphic Arts at Boston University. Between 1983 and 1984 she attended the Andrés Bello Catholic University, UCAB, where she studied education, with a focus on physical and mathematical disciplines. In 1985 she joined the Neumann Institute of Caracas, where she graduated as a graphic designer in 1989. In 1990 she began to attend the Scuola Bottega with AG Fronzoni in Milan, Italy, with whom she took a course in Inscape and Graphic Design until 1993. From 1990 to 2000 she worked as a freelance graphic designer in Italy. In 2001 and from 2002 to 2004 she taught workshops called Approach to Space and Practice and Criticism of Contemporary Systems of Visual Representation at the Instituto Universitario de Estudios Superiores de Artes Plásticas Armando Reverón (IUESAPAR) in Caracas.

In 2011, Fernández's solo exhibit, Shifting Objects/Atmospheres-Structures-Grounds, at the Periférico Carcas/Arte Contemporáneo in Caracas.
