= Claudio Costa (artist) =

Italian avant-garde artist of the 1970s

Claudio Costa

Claudio Costa (1942 – 1995) was a Contemporary Artist from the 1970s avant-garde movement.

== Personal life ==
Costa was born to Italian parents in Tirana, Albania. His family returned to Italy the same year he was born and settled in Monleone of Cicagna in Liguria. In 1961, Costa enrolled in the faculty of Architecture at Milan Polytechnic. His interests in the early 1960s were drawing and informal painting. In 1964, he obtained a grant awarded by the French government to go to Paris and study engraving. In 1965, he married Anita Zerio and in the same year their daughter, Marisol, was born. Costa's time in Paris was productive. He met Marcel Duchamp at the rue Daguerre workshop in 1965 and also took part in the May 1968 student protests together with a group of artists, including Pierre Alechinsky, Asger Jorn, Roberto Matta, Antonio Seguí, Silvia Cortazar and others. In the autumn of the same year, he returned to Italy and began living in Rapallo with his family.

== Work ==
Costa's artistic production is divided in several different periods. He explored Arte povera, Conceptual Art, paleontologist and anthropological art, alchemic art. As an artist associated with the Arte Povera movement, Costa's first exhibition took place at the La Bertesca Gallery in Genova directed by Francesco Masnata. He produced a series of "tele acide" (acid canvases) (1970–1971), where he deployed a new pictorial language made of symbolical and magic elements by mixing them with materials and glue-earth-bone-blood-acids. Costa explained the acid canvases in his writings: "I used three acids and a sulfate; nitric acid, which corroded the support almost immediately, iron chloride which gave a brownish colour, and copper sulphate, which reminded me of the wonderful color of vine leaves when they are sprayed and which I needed to obtain a light blue base". In 1971, Costa investigated the confines between science and art as a paleontologist and anthropologist. He returned to the remote prehistoric past in search of the roots of mankind, especially in pieces like "Museo dell'Uomo" (Museum of Man), where he attempted a summary and condensation of his anthropological studies. "Alchemic Art" was also his main focus when he exhibited at the Venice Biennale in 1986 In 1988, he started working in Psychiatric Hospital in Genoa as an art-therapist. Costa had a large workshop inside the hospital. In this period he founded the "Institute for Unconscious Matter and Forms", where he exhibited works of patients as well as professional artists.

Costa died suddenly in Genoa on 2 July 1995.

== Selected exhibitions ==
- La Bertesca Gallery, Genoa (1969, 1971 and 1972)
- Diter Hacher Galerie, Berlin (1971)
- Venice Biennale (1972, 1986)
- Paris Biennale (1973)
- Ludwing Galerie, Aachen (1974)
- Project '74, Cologne (1974)
- Palazzo Reale, Milan (1974)
- Monteghirfo Museum of Active Anthropology (1975)
- Documenta 6, Museum Fridericianum, Kassel (1977)
- Museo Vostell, Càceres de Extremadura (1978)
- "Mythos and Ritual", Kunsthaus Zurich (1981)

== Selected bibliography ==
- Franco Ragazzi, Delle Magie e dei Miti, Erga Edizioni, Genoa, 1999
- Sandra Solimano (ed.), Claudio Costa, Museo d'Arte Contemporanea di Genova and Skira, Milan, 2000
