= The European Fine Art Fair =

Annual art fair held in Maastricht

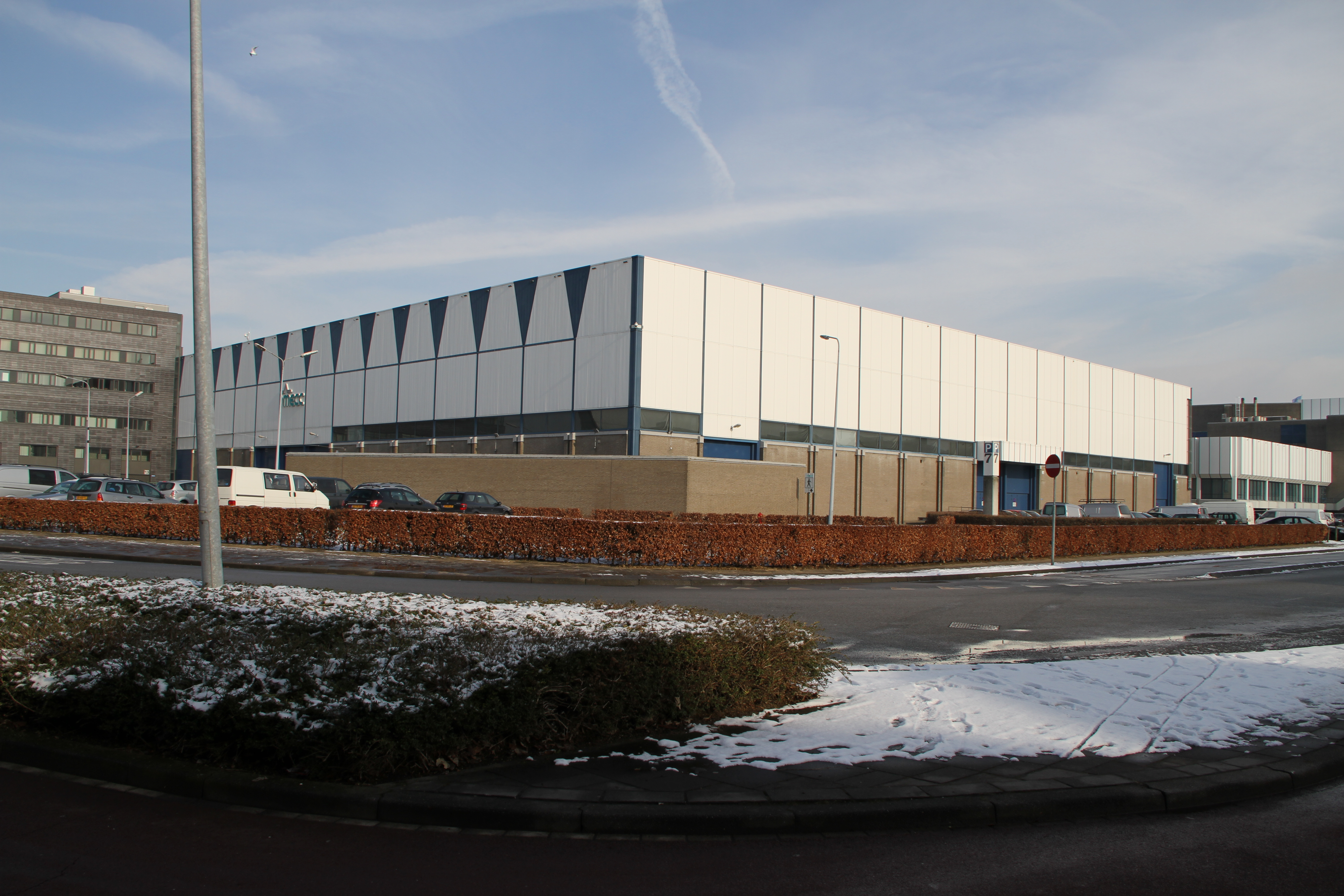
The MECC venue in Maastricht, home to TEFAF for over 25 years

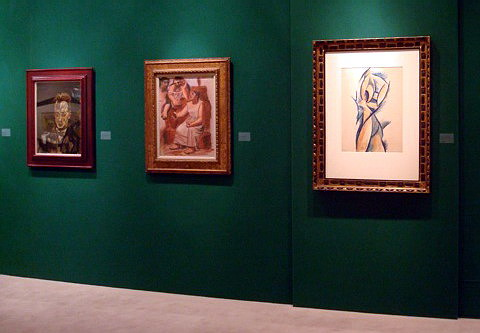
Picassos lining a wall at the fair in 2011

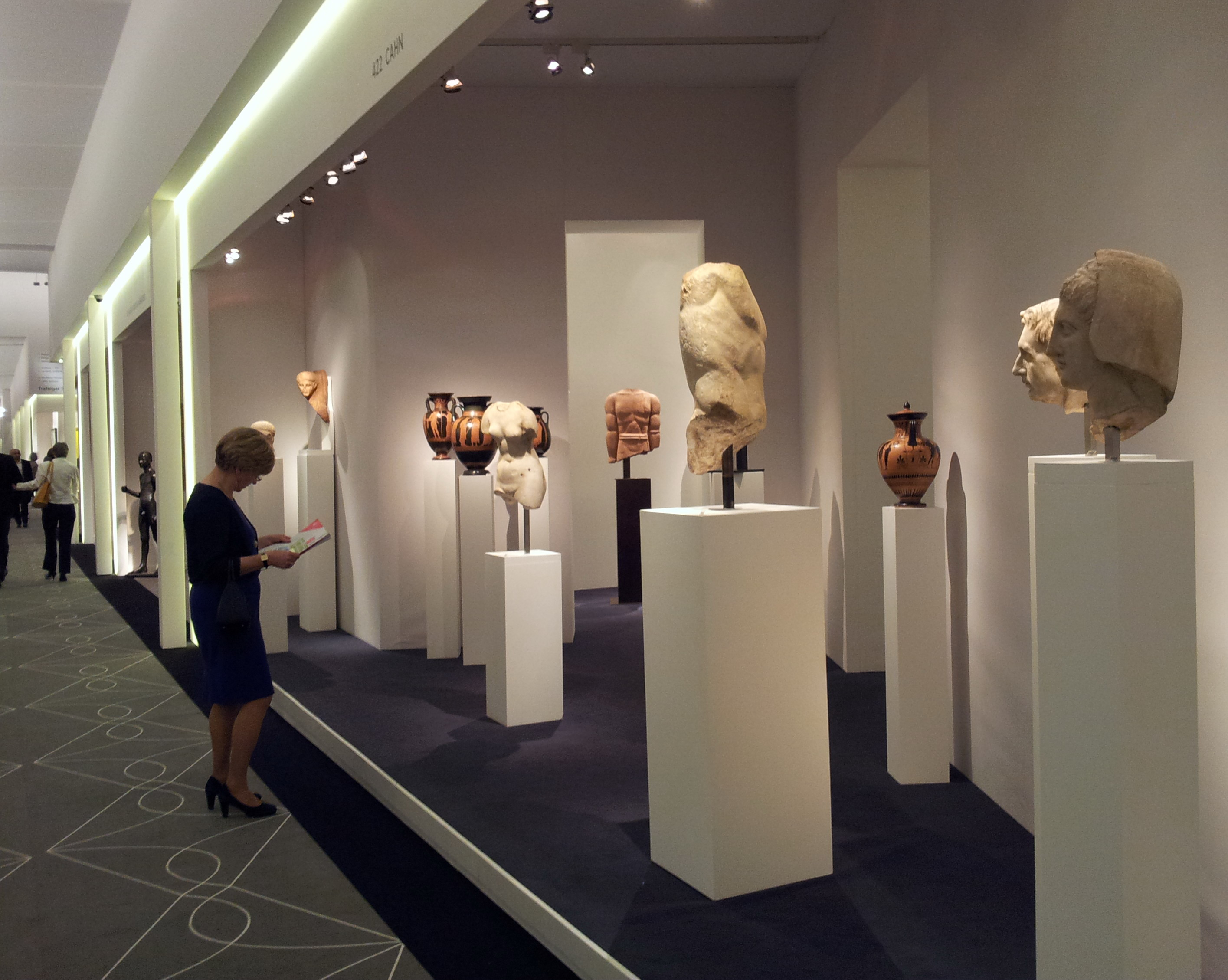
Greek and Roman sculptures for sale in 2014

The European Fine Art Fair known as TEFAF is an annual art, antiques, and design fair organized by The European Fine Art Foundation in the MECC in Maastricht, Netherlands and New York, United States. It was first held open in 1988.

== The fair ==
For ten days each year, 260 of the world's leading galleries from twenty countries, TEFAF Maastricht showcases the traditional areas of Old Master paintings and antique works of art currently on the market. In addition, visitors can view a variety of classical modern and contemporary art, such as jewellery, 20th-century design, and works on paper. There were 266 dealers from twenty countries at the fair's 2015 edition, showing museum-quality pieces ranging from classical antiquity to the 21st century, valued at 4 billion euros. TEFAF was reviewed by the Global Art Magazine.

== History ==
TEFAF Maastricht is the offspring of two Dutch fairs launched in the mid-1970s: Pictura and De Antiquairs International. Pictura was the first international fine art fair in the Netherlands and launched in 1975. Antiqua, an antiques fair launched in 1978, became De Antiquairs International in 1982. Both fairs merged in 1985 under the banner of the Antiquairs International and Pictura Fine Art fair, held at Maastricht's Eurohal.

A 10-day event organized by dealers under the umbrella of the non-profit European Fine Art Foundation, TEFAF Maastricht was subsequently launched at the MECC in 1988, with 89 participating dealers, the majority of them Dutch. It grew to rival known art centers like Paris and London and targeted wealthy collectors in Germany and Switzerland. Though the fair was founded as a fair for dealers in old masters art, more than half the participants have other specialties, including antiquities, furniture, decorative artwork from medieval times to today, rare books and jewellery. By 2014, 43% of dealers at TEFAF specialized in antiques (119 out of 274 galleries). A shortage of museum-quality historic paintings and collectors' shifting tastes have resulted in an increasing emphasis on more recent material.

In 2000, for the first time TEFAF launched an independent study about the size and structure of the European art and antiques market, resulting in the annual publication of the Art Market Report. For years, the fair was considered "a footnote in the annual art market calendar", according to the Wall Street Journal. During the art market boom, collectors put a premium on high-profile contemporary art sales like the Art Basel fairs in Switzerland and Miami and the biannual modern and contemporary art sales of Christie's and Sotheby's in London and New York. The fair celebrated its 25th anniversary in 2012 and is today regarded, along with Swiss modern and contemporary art fair Art Basel, as the world's leading art fair. In 2016, TEFAF formed a ten-year partnership with the Limburg provincial government, the city of Maastricht and the MECC Maastricht convention centre to improve the city's infrastructure.

Participating dealers are admitted only after a strict selection process. TEFAF Maastricht's vetting system involves about 175 international experts in 29 different categories, who examine every work of art in the Fair for quality, authenticity and condition. A number of objects deemed inauthentic or of "poor quality" are regularly placed in storage until fair's end. Moreover, TEFAF has joined the leading platform for stolen art to guarantee transparency towards collectors.

Representatives from about 225 major museums like the Louvre in Paris, the Prado in Madrid, the Frick Collection in New York, Museum of Fine Arts in Boston, the Rijksmuseum in Amsterdam, and the Getty Center in Los Angeles regularly visit the fair. TEFAF's wealthy visitors, many of whom fly in on private planes, have included Saud bin Muhammed Al Thani, Silvio Berlusconi, Calvin Klein, Brad Pitt, Kanye West and Michael Schumacher. One of the youngest buyers was 13-year-old Brahm Wachter from New York, who in 2003 bought a Rembrandt etching at TEFAF, using the money he received from his bar mitzvah.

One of the exhibitors at 2025 TEFAF Maastricht is entirely dedicated to Australia’s First Nations art which was painted for an audience against the backdrop of 20th century colonialism.

== Expansion plans ==
Between 1995 and 1999, TEFAF Basel was held at the Messe Basel.

In 1997, TEFAF considered launching a fair in New York, but could not find a site big enough to accommodate around 130 exhibitors. The National Building Museum in Washington, DC, was also mooted as a fair venue.

In 2013, TEFAF announced plans to hold a high-end art and antiques fair in China. The new event, which would have been called TEFAF Beijing 2014, was to have been a collaboration between Maastricht and Sotheby's joint venture with China's state-owned Beijing Gehua Cultural Development Group. A venture between a dealer-organized fair and an international auction house would have been unusual, emphasizing the importance of China for the West's art and antiques trade. However, the plans were abandoned shortly after.

In 2016, TEFAF announced plans to hold additional fairs in New York in 2016 and 2017. It has since been collaborating with the New York art advisers Artvest Partners on annual fairs at the Park Avenue Armory. The first two annual fairs at the Park Avenue Armory were TEFAF New York Fall in October and TEFAF New York Spring in May 2017. TEFAF permanently stopped producing two fairs in New York in 2021. The annual TEFAF New York Spring fair kicks off during the second week of May. Bank of America has been the leading partner of TEFAF New York since its launch in 2016. The design of the fair's layout has traditionally been carried out by Tom Postma Design.

== Management ==
- September 2, 2024, Dominique Savelkoul, Managing Director
- 2022-2023 Bart Drenth, interim MD
- 2020–2022: Charlotte van Leerdam
- 2015–2020: Patrick van Maris
- 1996–2015: Paul Hustinx

== Controversy ==
In 2010, a ring and necklace worth about $1.3 million were stolen from a booth run by Hancocks & Co. In June 2022, the entire fair was evacuated after several men, at least one of whom was reportedly armed, robbed a jewellery stand.

The organizers' decision to continue with TEFAF Maastricht amid the COVID-19 pandemic caused controversy in 2020. For the first time in its history, the fair eventually closed its 2020 edition early, after an exhibitor had been diagnosed with COVID-19. The next fair was held in New York in May 2022, and then in Maastricht in June 2022.
