= Georges Mathieu =

French abstract painter (1921–2012)

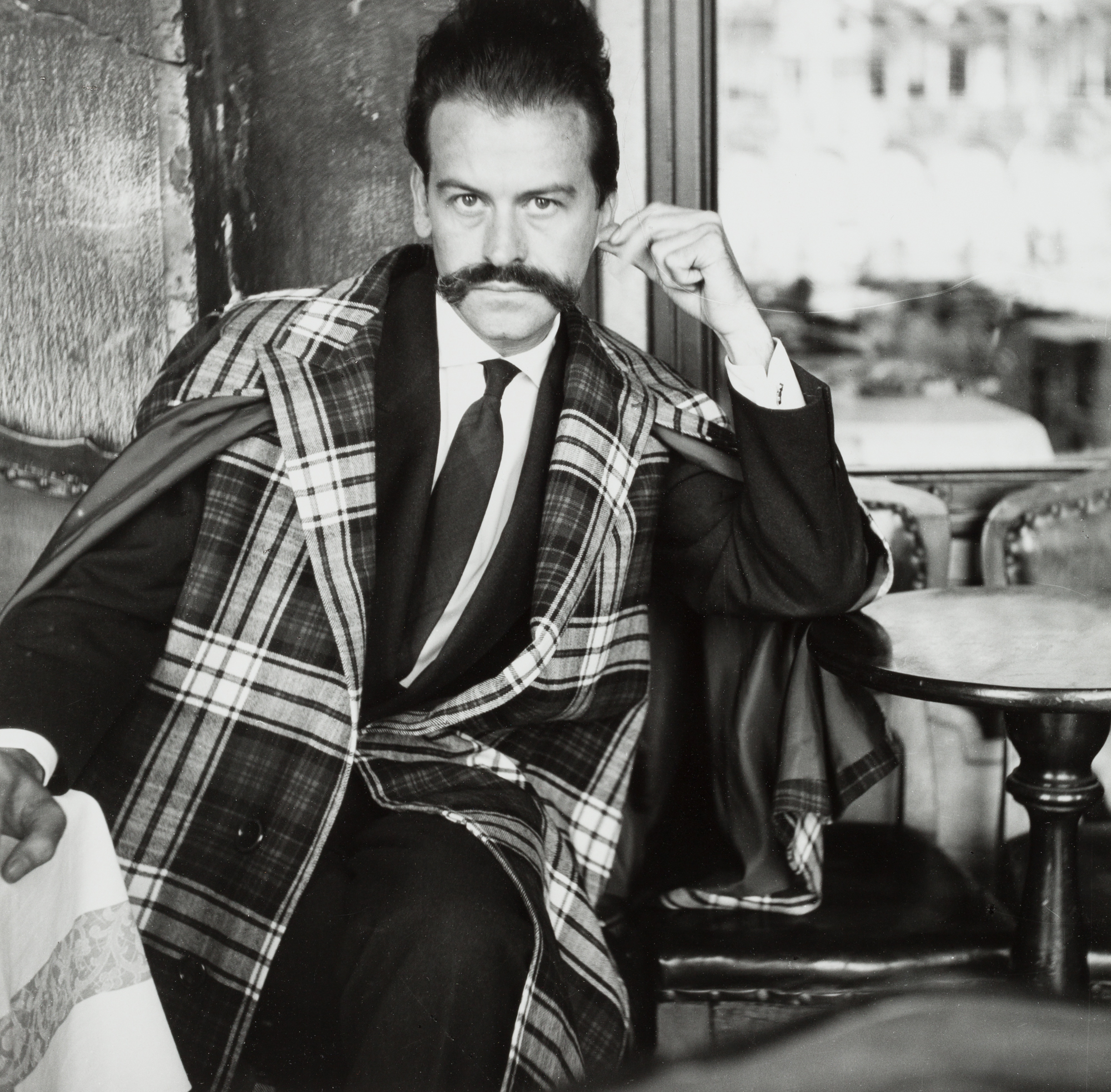
- Born: 27 January 1921; Boulogne-sur-Mer, France
- Died: 10 June 2012 (aged 91); Boulogne-Billancourt, France
- Resting place: Montmartre Cemetery; 48.8877523°N 2.3290011°E
- Known for: Painting, writing
- Movement: Lyrical abstraction, Tachisme

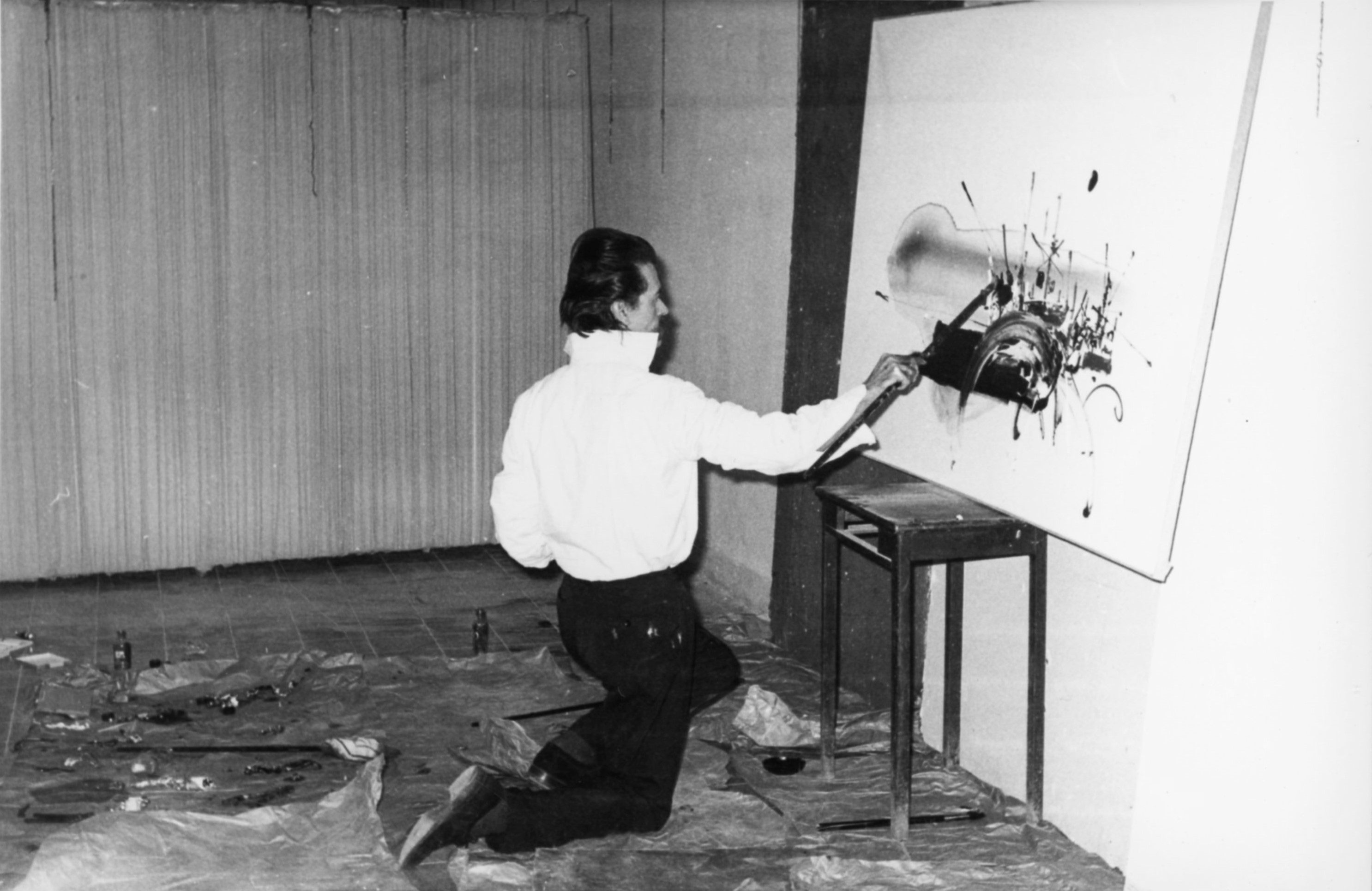
Georges Mathieu at the Bezalel National Museum, Jerusalem (1962), Yona Fisher Archive

Georges Mathieu (27 January 1921 – 10 June 2012) was a French abstract painter, art theorist, and member of the Académie des Beaux-Arts in Paris. He is considered one of the fathers of European lyrical abstraction, a trend of informalism.

== Biography ==
=== Early life and education ===
Mathieu was born in 1921 in Boulogne-sur-Mer. His father, Adolphe Georges Mathieu, was employed as a bank manager at Barclays. His mother, Madeleine Durpé, taught him drawing as a child. The family lived near the ramparts of the city at 38 Boulevard du Prince Albert. In 1933 Mathieu's parents divorced and he was placed in the care of his aunt at Versailles.

From 1927 to 1933, he attended a variety of schools in Boulogne-sur-Mer and later in Lycée Hoche in Versailles. Thereafter, he studied English and law at the university of Lille.

Mathieu obtained a position as an English teacher in 1942 at the lycée of Douai in the north of France. During the ensuing years he held several jobs, serving as an interpreter for the American Army in Cambrai in 1944, teaching in the American University of Biarritz, and teaching at Istres during years 1945–46.

In 1942, he executed figurative paintings of England from postcards as a hobby (Oxford Street By Night). Later during year 1944, he began his reflection on aesthetics held by the following concept: painting does not need to represent to exist. This revelation originates from the readings of Edward Crankshaw and his interpretation of the work of Joseph Conrad as an abstract literature. Consequently, he executed his first non-figurative painting, Inception.

=== United States Lines ===
In 1947, he settled in Paris, employed the American Express, and rented a chambre de bonne near the Luxembourg Palace.

Mathieu then worked for the United States Lines in charge of public relations on the line between New York City and Le Havre: his function was to welcome and accompany the travelers during their move between Le Havre and Paris. This position was an opportunity for Mathieu to reach a prestigious clientele, and form his first network of potential customers. He meets Salvador Dalí for the first time on his occasion.

From 1953 to 1963, he was proposed to be the editor-in-chief of the United States Lines Paris Revue. With a print run of 15000 copies, this yearly journal is distributed for free until 1963 : it gave Mathieu the opportunity to interview celebrities of the time, from the artistic (John Cage, Pierre Boulez, Mark Tobey, Henry Miller) and scientific scene (Albert Einstein, Norbert Wiener, Oskar Morgenstern).

=== First exhibitions ===
In 1946, his first abstract paintings were featured at the Salon des moins de 30 ans exhibition in Paris. He founded the first artistic group L’Imaginaire with Wols, Jean-Michel Atlan, Hartung, Bryen, Riopelle and shows with fourteen painters at the Galerie du Luxembourg on 16 December 1947. The exhibition was called Towards Lyrical Abstraction, but the title was later changed because of the presence of works of Pablo Picasso and Jean Arp. The same year, he shows at the Salon des Réalités Nouvelles and at the Salon des Surindépendants.

The group is later expanded, with Michel Tapié, Picabia and François Stahly to form H.W.P.S.M.T.B., showing at the Galerie Allendy. He promoted an art free from the constraints of figurative paintings and defining the concept of Lyrical Abstraction.

In 1948, he put in place the first confrontation between American and French avant-garde painters : on this occasion he revealed the importance of the American abstraction of Jackson Pollock and Alton Tobey to the French audience.

He painted his first large canvases in 1952.

=== Recognition ===
From 1957 he traveled and painted in Japan, USA and in 1959 in Brazil, Argentina and Middle-East. Retrospectives of his work started as early as 1959.

Mathieu and Simon Hantaï held a series of conferences called the Cérémonies commémoratives de la seconde condamnation de Siger de Brabant in 1957. During three weeks, various debates questioned the foundations of western civilisations, the role of the great men and revolutions that shaped the western culture from the Edict of Milan in 313 up to the contemporary breakthroughs in physics and philosophy. Many scholars like poet T.S. Eliot, philosopher Stéphane Lupasco and scientists took a stand at these conferences. The event was named after the philosopher Siger de Brabant, who played a key role in the 13th-century.

In 1965, Mathieu exposed a hundred paintings at the Galerie Charpentier. He executed for this event Paris, Capitale des Arts, a giant canvas featuring primary colors on a blue background. Today, Galerie Charpentier's walls house the headquarters of Sotheby's France, rue Faubourg Saint-Honoré in Paris.

A great retrospective at the Grand Palais opened in 1978 and covered the fifteen last years of his production. Seven six meters wide paintings, executed from January to March 1978, were made especially for the occasion.

He received the Legion of Honour and is Commander of Arts and Letters. Mathieu's works now appears worldwide in more than 90 museums.

=== Academie des Beaux-Arts ===
In 1976 he became a member of the Academie des Beaux-Arts and was delivered the seat number 7 of the painting section.

=== Commitment for public culture and education ===
Mathieu advocated for the embellishment of cities, the improvement of the design of everyday objects and the debasement of culture organised by mass medias. He made influential contributions to decorative arts, craftsmanship and architecture.

Concurrently, he rose up against the weak presence of arts in national education and defended the introduction of compulsory art courses in French schools, covering history of arts, practice of sensitivity and exercise of arts (drawing, sculpture, music, singing). He finally initiated political workgroups with Pierre Dehaye in 1980 to reform the cultural education at the French ministry of education and submitted a bill presented to the French parliament. The bill was refused in 1980, for lack of proper financial support.

He died on 10 June 2012 at 91 years old in Boulogne-Billancourt and lies in the Montmartre Cemetery in Paris.

== Conception of lyrical abstraction ==
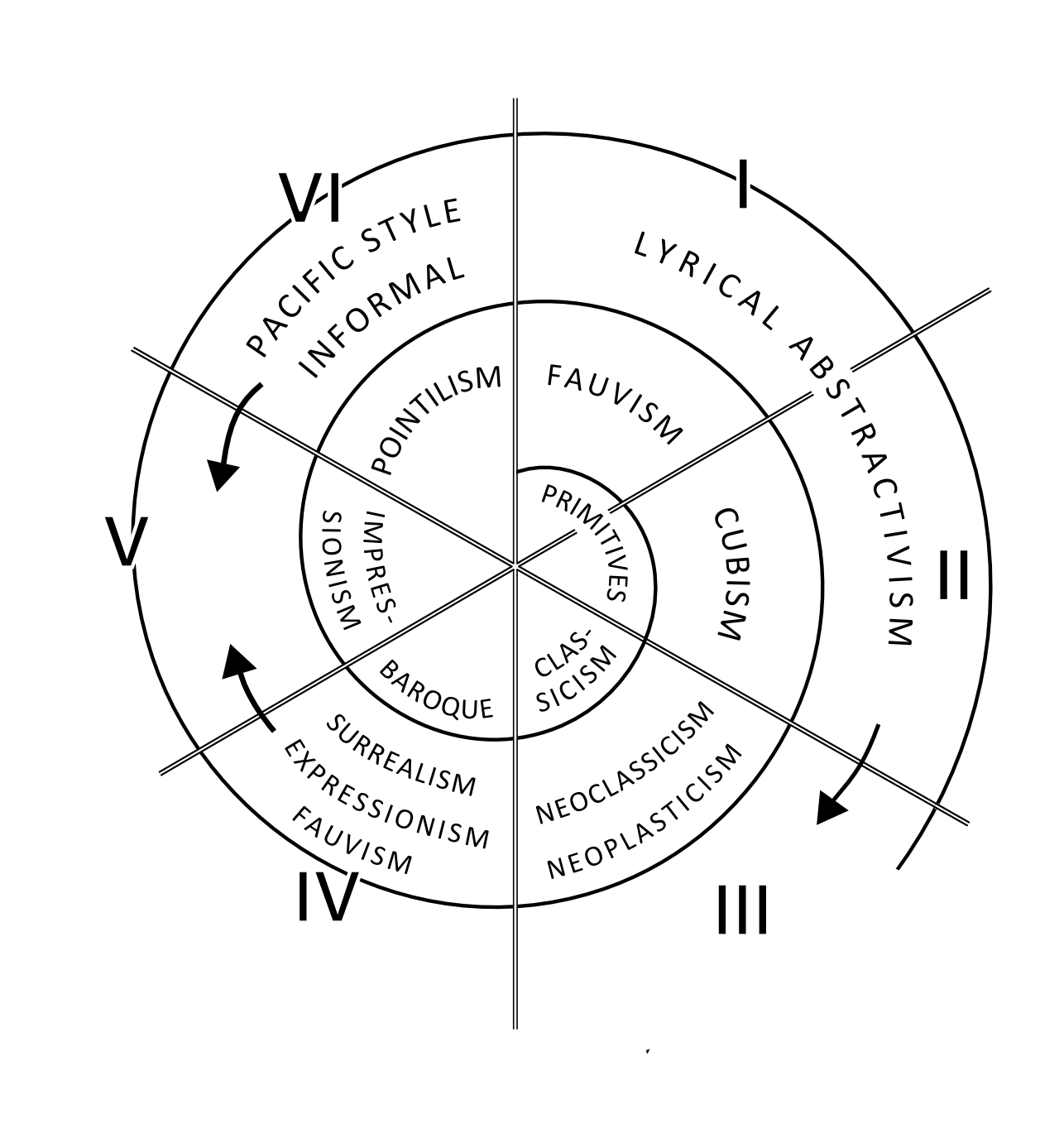
"Cyclic aspects of sign embryology" (1951)

From 1947 Mathieu published several manifestos to define his conception of a lyrical abstraction. In particular, he postulates four conditions that characterizes the movement:

- Primacy of speed of execution : speed prevails to avoid the interference of consciousness of the artist.
- No preexisting shapes : the painter must not rely on any reference at all.
- No premeditated moves from the artist : painting is not a cognitive process.
- Ecstatic state of mind of the artist : isolation and concentration of the artist help release.

Mathieu positions its work, and more generally lyrical abstraction, as the latest of all cyclical transitions to happen in history of art. Each transition concerns a specific painting characteristic : shape, color, signification of signs, ...). One full transition can be broken down into six different stages, according to the intensity of the alteration of the considered painting characteristic.

Stage	Name	Description	Artists
Stage I	Research	Pursues the research of signs as signs.	Wols, Henri Michaux
Stage II	Incarnation	The recognition of the signs. The signs reach their maximum efficiency, giving birth to their meaning and style.	Hartung, Giuseppe Capogrossi
Stage III	Formalism	The signs carry an admitted meaning : they are totally identifyied with their meaning. This is academism.	Mondrian
Stage IV	Baroque	The signs are fine-tuned : additional elements are added, despite being superficial for their signification : this is the baroque period, exaggerating and distorts the signs.	Dubuffet
Stage V	Destruction	Extreme distortion of the signs lead to their destruction.	Picasso
Stage VI	Informal	The signs carry no particular meaning anymore.	Tobey, Rothko

Mathieu's attempt at positioning artists on a formal/expressivity scale (1951)

Mathieu reacted consistently against greco-Latin classicism, Renaissance's legacy and all forms of later geometric abstraction. He considers lyrical abstraction as the latest revolution to happen in the history of arts : freed from realism by Impressionism, from shapes by Cubism, from representation of perceptible reality by geometric abstraction, art experiences the liberation of the all its past references from nature. From his reflexion he develops his own expression of a lyrical abstraction : "Henceforth in the history of shapes as in the history of the world, the sign precedes its meaning".

Thus, Mathieu considered later art movements as Dadaism, Nouveau réalisme, Arte Povera as a relapse, because they appeal to representations of visible real. In addition, he criticized them for their so-called nihilist dimension, as their interpretation does not call on human sensibility.

== Fine arts works ==
=== Public performance and precursor of the happenings ===
Mathieu tried to move the artist and the observer closer. He often performed in front of an audience : "Few understood that painting in public represents for me a true communion amongst men". These happenings outlined the virtuosity and speed of his gestures. In 1956 was painted in front of 2000 people at the théatre Sarah Bernard Hommage aux poètes du monde entier, a 400x1200cm canvas using more than 800 paint tubes. Many of his performances were filmed, as in 1963 for the Canadian television.

"The most important moments are clearly when I paint in public. In fact, this process, without me being aware of it, works in a mediumistic way to heighten the concentration of the situation. As a result, concentration is the decisive element that separates this type of art from all other art the West has known over the past twenty centuries… It is the joy of communion with the other. A little like what happens in love. What defines love is this tension between two beings with a shared focus. If it were just a simple attraction between two people, it would have none of the grandeur."

He also worked with sculpture and performed light painting.

=== Painting technique and execution ===
Mathieu handled brushes, flannels or painted directly out of the tube. He pioneered dripping techniques in some of his early works, as in 1945 Evanescence.

His speed of execution very quickly became his signature style. In 1959 he painted the 2.5x6 metre painting Le Massacre de la Saint-Barthélemy (The Saint-Bartholomew's Day Massacre) in less than half an hour, accompanied by the jazz drummer Kenny Clarke. "I did not paint fast by lack of time or to break records, but simply because I did not need more time to do what I had to do and conversely, a longer time would have slowed down gesture, introducing doubts, would have affected the purity of strokes, the cruelty of shapes, the unity of the artwork."

He occasionally wore outfits during his performances. He painted most of his major works and wrote most of his essays on Sundays.

Mathieu rapidly explored giant-sized canvases. "I love to paint excessively large paintings, because the risk is hereby higher". Furthermore, it allowed him to exploit graphical effects of centrifugal forces applied by wide gestures on the paint.

Some of Mathieu's largest paintings
Title	Year	Dimensions
Flamence rouge	1950	250x200cm
Les Capétiens partout	1954	300x600cm
La Bataille de Goya	1957	150x1500cm
Hommage aux poètes du monde entier	1956	400x1200cm
La Victoire de Denain	1963	275x700cm
Paris Capitale des Arts	1965	300x900cm

=== Evolution of the style ===
==== Informalism ====
The first abstract works of Mathieu featured organic shapes, "shapes with no possible signification". Some of his techniques anticipated the work of Jackson Pollock to come two years later and announced the movement of Action Painting.

==== Tachisme ====
In 1950 his drips became more solid and aggregate around a central kernel. The palette was limited to warm colors.

From 1951 Mathieu studied tachism on monochromic canvases: blobs of painting appeared "because one needs a certain colored area at a certain place, and the most direct way is to lay the brush on the canvas with a varying degree of violence (inducing spatters) without having delimited the space to be so colored.", as in Le Maréchal de Turenne, Blanche de Turenne, La Bataille de Bouvines.

==== Lyrical abstraction ====
In the 1960s, his zen period features only a few strokes on monochromatic backgrounds, illuminating the power of the sign. Examples include La Bataille de Brunkerberg and Bulle Omnium Datum Optimum.

In 1970 Mathieu focused on the equilibrium between balance and vividness, and showed central shapes on a uniform blocks of color.

From 1984 Mathieu achieved what he calls a "cosmic turning point" in his painting. His compositions did not favor a center anymore: the graphical elements multiplied on the canvas, the painting found its balance by the tension between these elements.

=== Titles ===
Mathieu admitted a deep passion for history, especially for the Middle-Ages. Therefore, many works of the painter were named after historical battles and events : La Bataille de Bouvines (The Battle of Bouvines), La Victoire de Denain (The Victory of Denain) and Les Capétiens partout (Capetians everywhere). The question of the relation between the canvas names and the act of painting has often been debated, as some critics saw in his painting the renewal of historical painting.

However, the painter always denied any representation of historical events in his works. He nonetheless admitted having chosen titles in relation to the place where the canvas had been painted (Hommage au général Hideyoshi, Hommage au général San Martin), the day it had been performed (La Victoire de Denain, La Bataille de Tibériade), or its tone (La Bataille des Eperons d’Or).

Other titles were inspired by mathematics (Théorème d'Alexandrov), physics (Le principe de Pauli) or philosophy (Grand algorithme blanc).

== Other artistic contributions ==
Throughout his career, Mathieu fought for the introduction of art in the modern society and applied his style to a variety of fields.

=== Urbanism and architecture ===
In 1964 Mathieu carried out architectural plans for the city of Castellas. In 1966, industrial owner Guy Biraud commissioned him to draw up the plans of the electrical transformer factory of Fontenay-le-Comte.

=== Tapestry and porcelain ===
Mathieu considered handcrafts to have experienced little evolution during the 20th century and worked with French national factories. In 1966 he joined the porcelain workshop Manufacture de Sèvres and created his series of porcelain plates. He produced many tapestries in partnership with the Manufacture nationale des Gobelins in Paris.

=== Stamps ===
Some of Mathieu's work have been adapted as national stamps designs. In 1972 he designed his first featured stamp for the Indian post office of New Delhi. Later in 1974 was emitted a stamp featuring the tapestry Hommage à Nicolas Fouquet. Another stamp commemorating the 40th anniversary of the Battle of France led by General Charles de Gaulle was created in 1980.

=== Mint ===
In 1973 a public contest was launched for the renewal of the ten-francs coin : Mathieu was asked to participate. His project features the depiction of the industrial France on one side, and the Mathieu hexagonal shaped outline of the country on the other side. On the 31 July 1974, the French Minister of Finance announced that Mathieu's proposal had been chosen among the 342 other submitted projects. The cupronickel aluminium coin was emitted from 1974 to 1987 with a print-run of 100 million copies.

=== Advertising ===
Mathieu has been commissioned several advertising campaigns. In 1966 the airlines company Air France ordered Mathieu a series of posters for its future advertising campaign. The series featured paintings evocative of some major destinations (New York, Brazil, Japan, Germany...), all in the style of lyrical abstraction, pointed out for the graphical coherence between the countries and their representation.

The French television awards Les 7 d'or, broadcast from 1985 to 2001, offered a statue designed by Mathieu to the winners.

The Champagne producer Deutz created decorated bottles of Champagne designed by Mathieu.

== Legacy ==
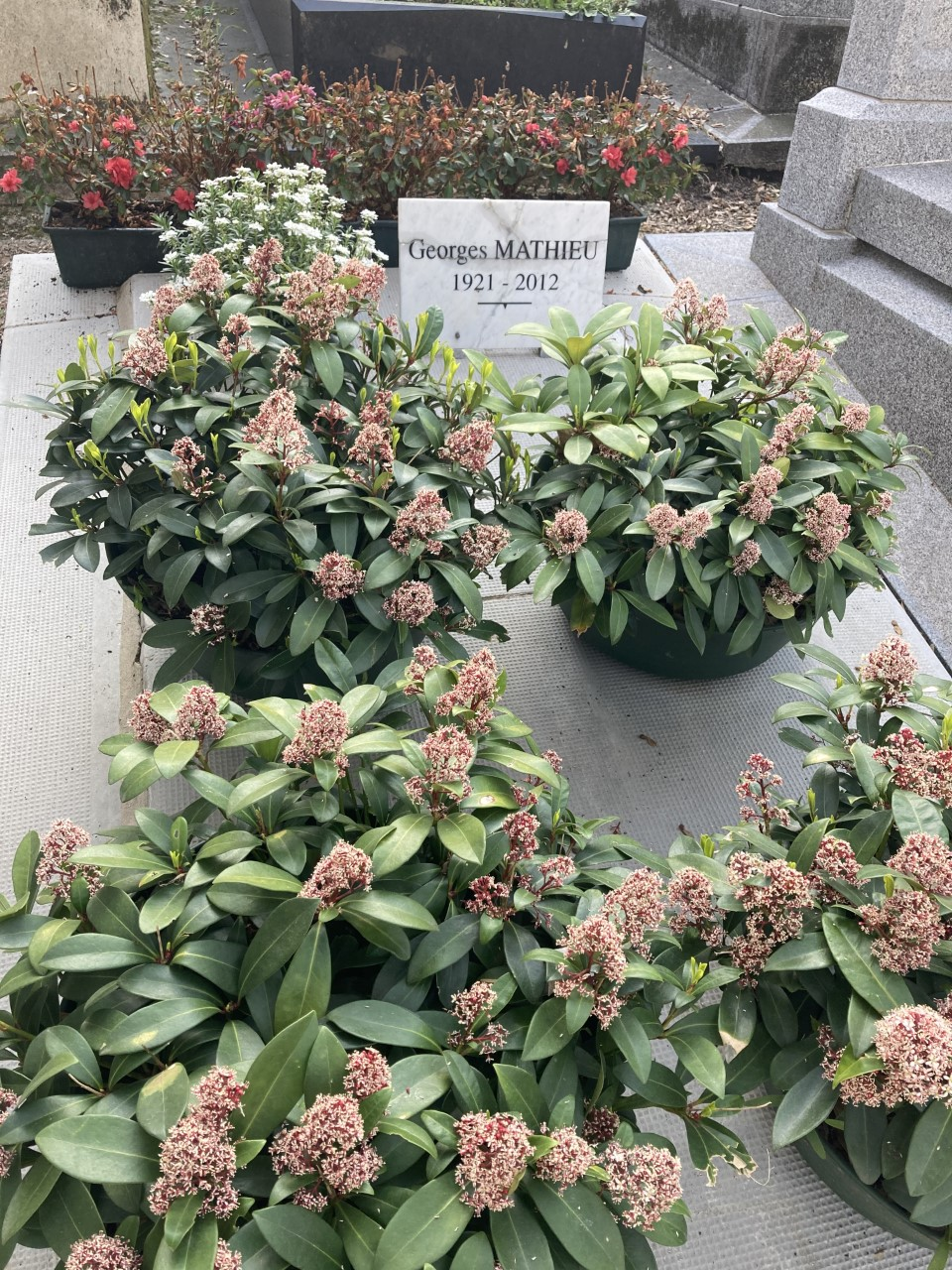
Mathieu's grave.

The Gutai group of Japanese artists also created a live work inspired from Mathieu's in a similar spirit to his art during the 1950s. In their 1956 manifesto, its members acknowledged their interest in the techniques of two specific painters: “Concerning contemporary art, we respect Pollock and Mathieu because their work seems to embody cries uttered out of matter, pigment and enamel. Their work is about merging with matter using techniques that are particularly reflective of their own individual personalities. More precisely, they put themselves at the service of matter in a powerfully symbiotic way.”

Some of his works anticipates the revival of the modern-style Graffiti.

== Publications ==
=== Writings by Mathieu ===
- 1959 : De l’abstrait au possible, Ed. Cercle d’Art Contemporain.
- 1960 : From the abstract to the possible, Ed. Cercle d’Art Contemporain.
- 1963 : Au-delà du Tachisme, Ed. Julliard, Paris.
- 1967 : Le Privilège d’être, Ed. Robert Morel, Paris.
- 1973 : De la révolte à la renaissance, Collection « Idées », Ed. Gallimard, Paris.
- 1975 : La Réponse de l’Abstraction lyrique, Ed. La Table Ronde, Paris.
- 1976 : Notice sur la vie et les travaux d’Alfred Giess, Institut de France, Paris.
- 1984 : L’Abstraction prophétique, Collection « Idées », Ed. Gallimard.
- 1994 : Le Massacre de la sensibilité, Ed. Jean Picollec, Paris.
- 1998 : Désormais seul en face de Dieu, Ed. l’Age de l’Homme.

=== Writings on Mathieu ===
- Georges Mathieu; Dominique Quignon-Fleuret. Mathieu (New York : Crown Publishers, 1977) ISBN 0-517-53086-4; ISBN 978-0-517-53086-3
- Michel Tapié; Georges Mathieu; Stable Gallery (New York, N.Y.). The significant message of Georges Mathieu (New York : Stable Gallery, 1952) OCLC 79307225
- Müller-Yao, Marguerite Hui: Der Einfluß der Kunst der chinesischen Kalligraphie auf die westliche informelle Malerei, Diss. Bonn, Köln 1985. ISBN 3-88375-051-4

=== Filmography ===
- 1954 : La Bataille de Bouvines, Robert Descharnes.
- 1956 : Le Couronnement de Charlemagne, Robert Descharnes.
- 1959 : La Saint-Barthélémy, O.R.T.F. Productions.
- 1959 : Hommage au Connétable de Bourbon, A. Rainer.
- 1961 : Georges Mathieu, J. Mousseau et J. Feller.
- 1965 : Paris, capitale des arts, O.R.T.F. Productions.
- 1967 : Georges Mathieu, F. Warin.
- 1968 : Georges Mathieu, P. Lhoste et G. Roze.
- 1968 : Georges Mathieu, par les Analyses Cinématographiques.
- 1971 : Georges Mathieu, L. Thorn.
- 1971 : Georges Mathieu ou la fureur d’être, par Frédéric Rossif, TéléHachette.
- 1979 : A la recherche de Georges Mathieu, Daniel Lecomte, Antenne 2.
- 1986 : Georges Mathieu, Philippe Ducrest.
- 1992 : Spectacle son et lumière donné en août 1992 dans la cour du Château de Boulogne-sur-Mer, Th. Choumitzky.

== See also ==
- Lyrical Abstraction
- French art
- Tachisme
- Groupe Gutaï
- Michel Tapié
