= Serge Poliakoff =

French painter (1900–1969)

- Composition grise et rouge, 1964, oil on canvas, 160 × 130 cm
- Born: 8 January 1900; Moscow, Russian Empire
- Died: 12 October 1969 (aged 69); Paris, France
- Known for: Painting
- Movement: Tachisme

Serge Poliakoff (January 8, 1900 – October 12, 1969) was a Russian-born French modernist painter belonging to the 'New' École de Paris (Tachisme).

== Biography ==
Serge Poliakoff was born in Moscow in 1900, the thirteenth of fourteen children. His father, a Kyrgyz, supplied the army with horses that he bred himself and also owned a racing stable. His mother was heavily involved with the church, and its religious icons fascinated him. He enrolled at the Moscow School of Painting, Sculpture and Architecture, but fled Russia in 1918. He arrived in Constantinople in 1920, living off the profits from his talent as a guitarist.

He went on to pass through Sofia, Belgrade, Vienna, and Berlin before settling in Paris in 1923, all the while continuing to play in Russian cabarets. In 1929 he enrolled at the Académie de la Grande Chaumière. His paintings remained purely academic until he discovered, during his stay in London from 1935 to 1937, the abstract art and luminous colours of the Egyptian sarcophagi.It was a little afterwards that he met Wassily Kandinsky, Sonia and Robert Delaunay, and Otto Freundlich. Poliakoff held his first one-man Paris exhibition in 1945.

With these influences, Poliakoff quickly came to be considered one of the most powerful painters of his generation. In 1947, he was trained by Jean Deyrolle in Gordes in the Vaucluse region of France amongst peers such as Gérard Schneider, Émile Gilioli, Victor Vasarely, and Jean Dewasne. By the beginning of the 1950s, he was still staying at the Old Dovecote hotel near Saint-Germain-des-Prés, which was also home to Louis Nallard and Maria Manton, and continuing to earn a reliable income by playing the balalaika. A contract enabled him to quickly gain better financial stability.

In 1962 a room was given over to his paintings by the Venice Biennial, and Poliakoff became a French citizen in the same year. His works are now displayed in a large number of museums in Europe and New York. Poliakoff also worked with ceramics at the Manufacture nationale de Sèvres. He influenced the paintings of Arman.

In 2006, works by Poliakoff were chosen by the Musée du Luxembourg for their exhibition entitled 'L'Envolée lyrique(lit:'lyric Flight'), Paris 1945-1956', namely 'Composition en brun', 1947, Ny Carlsberg Glypothek, Copenhagen; 'Composition rouge avec trait', 1952, Cologne Museum; 'Composition IV', 1954) [catalogue : ISBN 88-7624-679-7].

In 2013, The Musée d’Art Moderne de la Ville de Paris devoted a large-scale retrospective to the abstract painter which included 150 works from the period 1946–1969. Since 1970 there has been no significant exhibition of the work of Serge Poliakoff in what became his home city.

== Exhibitions ==
- Serge Poliakoff, Galleria Lorenzelli, Bergamo (1970)
- Serge Poliakoff, Lorenzelli Arte, Milan (1983)
- Serge Poliakoff, Le rêve des formes, Musée d'Art Moderne de la Ville de Paris (2013)
- Serge Poliakoff, Galerie Applicat-Prazan, Paris (2013)

== Works ==
- Available Paintings, Works on Paper and Biography Galerie Ludorff, Düsseldorf, Germany

== See also ==
- École de Paris

== Sources ==
This article draws heavily on the fr:Serge Poliakoff article in the French-language Wikipedia, which was accessed in the version of November 20, 2006.

- Jean Cassou, Poliakoff, Bodensee-Verlag, Amriswil (Switzerland), 1963.
- Lydia Harambourg, Serge Poliakoff, dans L'École de Paris 1945–1965, Dictionnaire des peintres, Neuchâtel, Ides et Calendes, 1993 (ISBN 2-8258-0048-1).
- Alexis Poliakoff et Gérard Schneider, Poliakoff, Editions Galerie Française, München, 280 p. (ISBN 3-00-002049-7)
- Françoise Brütsch, Serge Poliakoff, Editions Ides et Calendes, Neuchâtel, 1993, 200 p. (ISBN 2-8258-0044-9)
