= Camille Bryen =

French poet, painter and engraver (1907–1977)

- Born: September 17, 1907; Nantes
- Died: May 8, 1977 (aged 69); Paris

Camille Bryen, also known as Camille Briand, (September 17, 1907– August 5, 1977) was a French poet, painter and engraver.

Associated with the School of Paris, his work plays a part in the history of lyrical abstraction and tachisme.

== Legacy ==
In 1987 the French postal served issued a 5 Franc stamp that reproduced his work Précambrien.

Bryen was included in the exhibition L'envolée lyrique, Paris 1945–1956, presented by the Musée du Luxembourg, Paris in 2006.

== Collections ==
- Kunstmuseum Basel
- Musée Cantini
- Musée d'art et d'industrie de Saint-Étienne
- Musée du Frac Bretagne, Rennes
- Museum of Modern Art, New York

== Bibliography ==
- Daniel Abadie, Bryen Abhomme, La Connaissance, Brussels, 1973
- Jacques Audiberti, Bryen. L’ouvre-boîte, Gallimard, Paris, 1952
- Jacqueline Boutet-Loyer, Bryen, l’œuvre peint, Quatre Chemins, Paris, 1986
- Jacqueline Boutet-Loyer, La Dérive graphique de Camille Bryen, Galerie Callu Mérite, Paris, 1988
- Jacqueline Boutet-Loyer, Bryen et le défi de la peinture éternelle, Galerie Callu Merite, Paris, 1990
- Michel Butor, Bryen, en temps conjugués, Galerie de Seine, Paris, 1975
- Jean Clair, Propos d’un abhumaniste, interview, Chroniques de l’Art Vivant, Paris, 1971
- Georges Mathieu, Au-delà du tachisme, Paris, 1963
- Pierre Restany, Lyrisme et abstraction, Milan, 1960
- Michel Tapié, Un art autre, Paris, 1952
- Roger van Gindertael, Bryen, Galerie Raymonde Cazenave, Paris, 1960
- Marc Alyn, Camille Bryen, architecte de l'informel, Approches de l'art moderne, Bartillat, 2007
- Jacqueline Loyer, « Bryen », Nouvelles de l'estampe, 1975, catalog for engraved works
