= AG Fronzoni =

Italian graphic designer and design educator (1923–2002)

Angiolo Giuseppe Fronzoni (5 March 1923 – 8 February 2002), more commonly known as AG Fronzoni, was an Italian graphic designer, publisher, industrial designer, architect, and educator.

== Career ==
In 1945, AG Fronzoni opened his own studio in Brescia, Italy that specialized in publishing, graphic design, architecture, exhibition design and industrial design. He edited architectural magazines including Punta and Casabella. In 1956, Fronzoni founded a second studio in Milan. In 1963 he designed the minimalist, Quadra Lamp and a sleek briefcase in collaboration with Italian luxury brand Valextra. From 1965 to 1967 Fronzoni was the designer for the architectural magazine Casabella. Fronzoni taught at the Società Umanitaria in Milan, Istituto d'Arte of Monza and the Istituto Delle Industrie Artistiche in Urbino. He founded his own school in Milan in 1987. During this period, Fronzoni founded a workshop school which he ran from 1982 to 2001. Fronzoni died in 2002.

== The Bottega ==
With the Bottega, Fronzoni developed a new type of teaching different from the models used by vocational schools, known for the relationships established with its students. For Fronzoni, projects came to life from reality: every event is subject to design analysis, and the practice of provocation is always pushing for the comparison, reflection, and formation of a critical sense. Education, like all other forms of social communication, was essential for Fronzoni. He felt it necessary to pass on the knowledge he had accumulated through years of practice. Fronzoni's workshop "trained and directed students towards the art of continual research and turning that research into the essence of life, nature and the form around them".

"Since being invited into schools in 1967, I have become more and more aware that the real job of the designer, rather than any technique, is to cultivate: the designer's real objective is not to build the city but to show how a city may be built, with the city as a tangible form of civilisation." - AG Fronzoni

"My ambition is not to design a poster, it's designing men."

== The Philosophy ==
"The deeper meaning of the design is not so much to build a house, but how to build ourselves. Design their own existence is a commitment that must be our main concern, and this commitment must be total and continuous, non-drinker and relative."

Fronzoni believed in the ability to transform the world through design and design through culture. He did not hesitate to fight for the sense of form, even to defending a tiny typeface. The small historic influence in Italy of the Bauhaus made him maintain an attitude of critical and uncompromising standing of what is conventional, formal and conformist, which is reflected in its particular way of life transgression, a transgression absolutely "governed rather than disobedient". Fronzoni claimed that he was not aiming to satisfy the needs of the clients, but rather to do away with them. Fronzoni believed that the art of design should not be kept to the professionals but be as "widespread as writing". He believed his only client was the community and in turn became a designer for the people.

== Black & White ==
Fronzoni considers black and white as the colors representative of the design of man, an expression of opposition and reflection, while the color belongs to the natural world and is so alien, but not as an alternative to the work of man. Fronzoni's many projects reflect his ideals towards black and white: the rigor of the contrast of white and black, provides a sense of conceptual purity as well as the tones of minimalism. The poster is the space of freedom of thought, without limits or rules, essentially a sandbox. The typefaces are for Fronzoni the "grammar" of graphic design: small if you have to emphasize the space of reading if you are thinking are large, cut, scored, manipulated.

"The symmetry of the past, while the asymmetry is modern, because it is dynamic, and a staple for contemporary design. What has been done not only is modern: it is the mirror of a society is not advanced."

== Projects ==
Casabella: During the mid-sixties, Fronzoni and Alessandro Mendini were responsible for the visual language and layout of one of the most important magazines on architecture: Casabella. Fronzoni's approach as art director shaped its style and content. The issues published between 1965 and 1967, under his direction can be considered a radical reinterpretation of the already established Swiss style. Each cover featured a tiny masthead accompanied by one picture printed in a single colour. The arrangement of the image gave a preview of the grid Fronzoni used for the pages inside. The upper quarter of the page was reserved for headlines. The rest of the page was based on an asymmetric layout with text starting on the left column and pictures spreading alongside over two columns. The whole magazine was typeset in Helvetica. After two years of successful collaboration, when the editor Gian Antonio Bernasconi asked Fronzoni to redesign the magazine he resigned.

Selected Projects in the Field of Industrial Design

- Quadra lamp was designed in 1962 and went into production in 2002.
- Form Zero 63+65 suitcase series designed in 1963 and 1965 to contain six suites.
- Series '64 is a furniture line (bed, tables, chair, lounge chair). Fronzoni employed it in most of his interior design and architectural projects, as well as in his Bottega school. Series '64 is produced by Capellini to this day.

In 1966, Fronzoni collaborated in the restoration of the Palazzo Balbi Senarega in Genova and its conversion into the History of Art Institute.

He restored the Cairoli College Stables building in Pavia, and converted it into the University Art Gallery in 1971.

Many of Fronzoni's works are part of permanent collections: the Bibliothèque Nationale and the Musée des Arts Décoratifs in Paris, in Kunstgewerbe Museum in Zurich, in the Musée Cantonal des beaux-arts de Lausanne, in Deutsches Bucherei Leipzig, Deutsches Plakat Museum in Essen, in the Muzeum Narodowe Warsaw, in Morovska Galerie in Brno, in the Stedelijk Museum in Amsterdam, the Royal Ontario Museum in Toronto.

== Bibliography ==
- Pierluigi Cerri (editor), Il campo della grafica italiana (Rassegna n. 6, 1981), pp. 68–72.
- Luigi Giordano, Trasgredisco, dunque sono, in il Mattino, 3 September 1988, p. 15.
- Giorgio Fioravanti, Leonardo Passarelli, Silvia Sfligiotti, La Grafica in Italia, Milano, Leonardo Arte, 1997, pp. 128–129.
- Aldo Colonetti e Andrea Rauch (editors), Epoca 1945-1999. Manifesti tra vecchio secolo e nuovo millennio, Siena, Protagon, 1999, pp. 76–77.
- Marco Belpoliti, L'uomo che comunicava con gli spazi vuoti, in La Stampa, 15 February 2002, p. 27.
- Marco Belpoliti, Democrazia grafica di AG Fronzoni, in Alias supplemento a il manifesto, 2 March 2002, p. 5.
- Franco Bertoni, Minimalist Design, Birkhauser Architecture, 2004, ISBN 978-3-7643-6506-6.
- Felix Studinka, Schwarz und Weiß / Black and White, Lars Muller Publishers, 2004, ISBN 978-3-03778-014-5.
- Mikado Koyanagi, BOOK DESIGN OF GRAPHIC DESIGNERS IN THE WORLD, Tokyo, PIE Books, 2007, ISBN 978-4894445154.
- Gabriele Oropallo, "Design as a Language without Words: AG Fronzoni" in Grace Lees-Maffei (ed), Writing Design: Words and Objects, Oxford: Berg, 2012, ISBN 978-1-84788-955-3.
- Ester Manitto, A lezione con AG Fronzoni. Dalla didattica della progettazione alla didattica di uno stile di vita / A lesson with AG Fronzoni. From teaching design to designing lifestyle, plug_in, 2012, ISBN 978-88-95459-10-3.
