= Maurice Estève =

French painter

- Born: 2 May 1904; Culan (Cher), France
- Died: 29 June 2001 (aged 97); Culan (Cher), France
- Known for: Painting, drawing

Maurice Estève (2 May 1904, Culan (Cher) – 29 June 2001) was a French painter.

== Biography ==
Maurice Estève was born in the French town of Culan (Département Cher) on 2 May 1904. In 1913 he moved to Paris with his parents, where he soon began his education as an artist. Estève worked for a year as designer in a textile factory in Barcelona 1923. During his visits to the Louvre in the 1920s, Estève was particularly impressed by the painters Jean Fouquet and Paolo Uccello. Among the modern artists, Paul Cézanne had the greatest influence on Estève.

Maurice Estève was largely self-educated, having only attended the free studio of the Académie Colarossi in 1924, where he tried to constructively implement of his motifs according to the model of Georges Braque and Fernand Léger, thus creating a kind of Cubist Fauvism.

Estève began to move away from realism in 1928, and was influenced in the following years by Léger, Matisse and Bonnard. His first one-man exhibition was given at the Galerie Yvangot, Paris, 1930. He worked as assistant to Robert Delaunay on huge decorative panels for the 1937 Paris International Exhibition. In the 1940s his stylized figure, still-life and landscape compositions with strong colors gradually became completely abstract, with tight-knit interlocking shapes in rich, bold colors. Has made a number of watercolors and collages, and designed stained glass in 1957 for a church at Berlincourt in the Bernese Jura.

Estève's extensive work was not limited to the genre of painting. He was also active in collage, textile design and murals. Estève avoided the extrovert circles of Avant-garde but still belonged to the core of the artists who brought about the breakthrough of École de Paris after 1945.

Maurice Estève took part in the Venice Biennale in 1954. His œuvre, just like the works of his art colleagues Riopelle and Bazaine, established a new pictorial language: Lyrical abstractions with the aim of depicting form and color with an almost poetic attitude. His works have established themselves in many well-known museums and collections around the world.

Maurice Estève died on 29 June 2001 at the age of 97 in his home town of Culan.
