= Gérard Ernest Schneider =

Swiss artist (1896–1986)

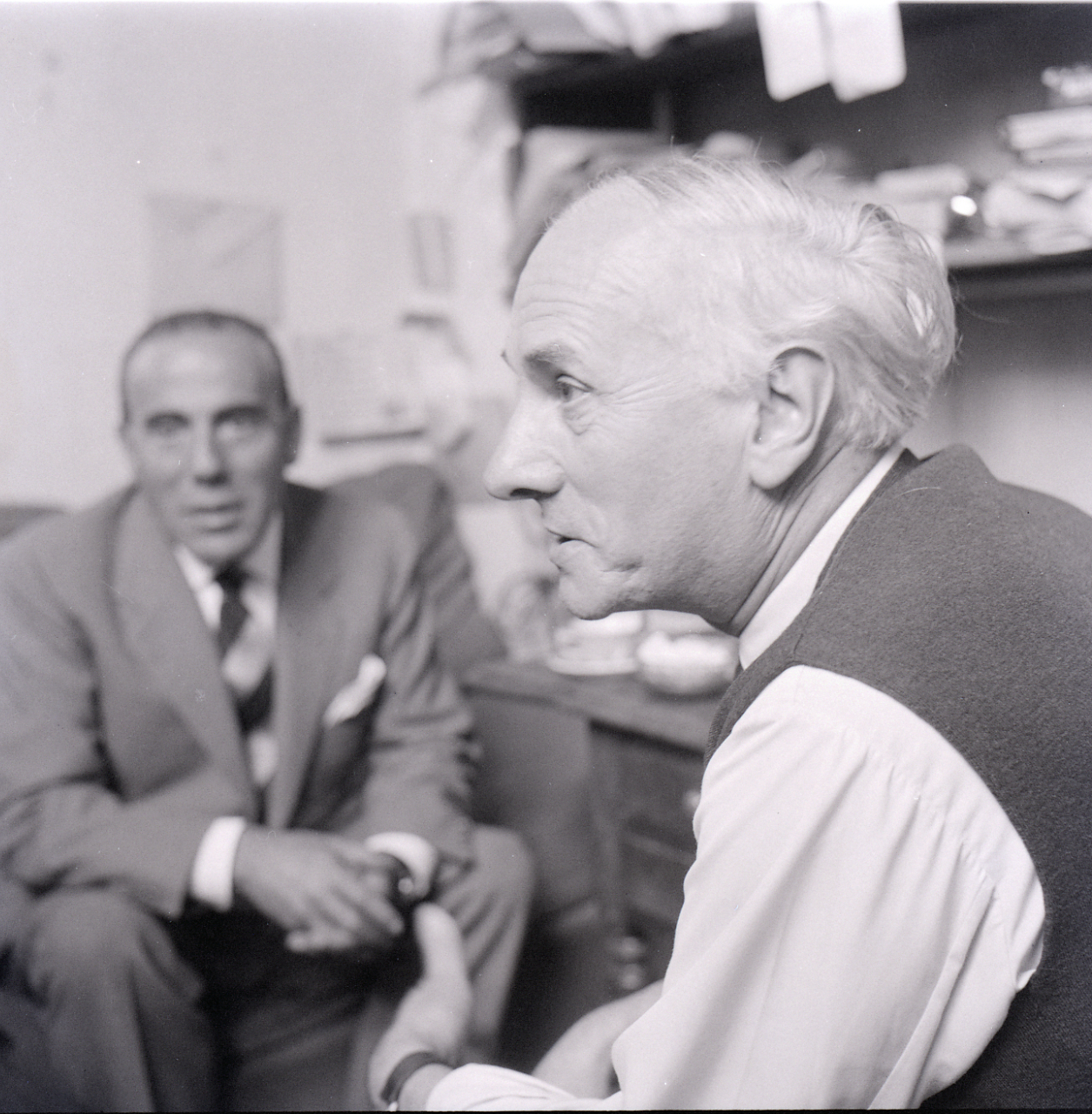
Gérard Schneider, photo by Paolo Monti, 1961 (Fondo Paolo Monti, BEIC).

Gérard Ernest Schneider (1896 in Sainte-Croix, Switzerland – 1986 in Paris, France) was a Swiss painter. He was a key figure in lyrical abstraction movement and the School of Paris.

== Life ==
Schneider was born in Sainte-Croix, Switzerland in 1896. At the age of 20, he moved to Paris to study at the École des Arts Décoratifs. In 1918, he enrolled at the École des Beaux-Arts, joining the studio of Fernand Cormon, renowned for having taught artists such as Vincent Van Gogh, Henri de Toulouse-Lautrec, and Emile Bernard.

In 1920, Schneider held his first solo exhibition at the Léopold Robert Gallery in Neuchâtel. By 1922, Schneider had permanently settled in France and from the mid-1920s onward, he actively took part in numerous group exhibitions. Until 1944, his artistic style evolved significantly, transitioning from surrealism to lyrical abstraction. He met Pablo Picasso in 1939 and participated in teaching Gurjieff between 1941 and 1943.

In 1946, Schneider took part in a group exhibition at the Denise René Gallery in Paris, recognised as the first post-war exhibition dedicated to lyrical abstraction. In 1948, Schneider obtained French citizenship. The same year, he was invited to participate in the Venice Biennale. He would exhibit there again in 1954 and 1966.

From the 1950s onward, alongside artists such as Hans Hartung and Pierre Soulages, Schneider became a leading figure among the second generation of abstract painters. Rejecting geometric abstraction, he helped define the lyrical abstraction movement.

In 1955, Schneider signed an exclusivity contract with New York art dealer Samuel Kootz, a key promoter of abstract expressionism in the United States. From 1955 to 1960, Schneider's work was exclusively exhibited at the Kootz Gallery in New York.

Scheider died in Paris in 1986.

== Style ==
Eugène Ionesco spoke of “the original, eruptive, richness” of his work.

From gesture, “the shape is born, whether lyrical or dramatic, with its colour and technical means, without any reference to external nature” according to Schneider.

From nervous gesture and volcanic composition, full of tension, of the 1950s followed “the light years” from Michel Ragon's expression, which were marked by the balance of forms reflecting each other and the explosion of colour. "Painting should be looked in the same way as music is listened to", as Schneider enjoyed saying.

Musical, his work is to be understood like “an orchestra” which expresses “passion, fury, romanticism“ according to Michel Ragon.

== Collections ==
The works of Schneider are in museums including the Centre Pompidou in Paris, MoMa in New York, the Phillips Collection in Washington, the Museum of Fine Arts of Montréal and the Modern Art Museum of Rio de Janeiro, as well as private collections and foundations such as the Fondation Gandur pour l’Art in Geneva.

== Catalogue raisonné ==
The Galerie Diane de Polignac in Paris is preparing the Catalogue raisonné of the works on canvas by Gérard Schneider edited by Laurence Schneider, the artist's daughter, and Patrick Gilles Persin, an art historian.

== Major exhibitions ==
- L'Envolée lyrique, Paris 1945-1956, Musée du Luxembourg, Paris, 26/04/2006-6/08/2006
- Gérard Schneider, grands gestes pour un grand monde, Musée d’Art & d’Histoire, Neuchâtel, 15/05/2011-16/10/2011
- Les Sujets de l’abstraction, Peinture non-figurative de la Seconde École de Paris (1946-1962), Fondation Gandur pour l’Art, Musée Rath, Genève, 06/05/2011-14/08/2011
- Gérard Schneider. Rétrospective, Musée des Beaux-Arts d’Orléans, 24/02/13-2/06/13

== Links ==
- Official website
