= Artpool Art Research Center =

Art research library in Budapest, Hungary

Coordinates: 47.5202367163838°N 19.073256972973994°E

Artpool Art Research Center is an archive, research space, specialist and media library in Budapest, Hungary, dedicated to international contemporary and avant-garde arts, such as artist's books, artistamp, mail art, visual poetry, sound poetry, conceptual art, fluxus, installation, and performance.

It was founded in 1979 based on the "Active Archive" conception as a center for the type of avant-garde art that was marginalized by the state-socialist establishment. The "Active Archive does not only collect material already existing 'out there', but the way it operates also generates the very material to be archived".

The public archive and library contain unique documents of international and Hungarian avant-garde art and subculture from the 1960s on, such as "correspondence, notes, plans, ideas, interviews, writings, works of art, photo documents, catalogs, invitation cards, bibliographies, chronologies, diagrams, video and sound documents, CD-Roms, etc." Artpool in addition to running its own research projects receives ca. 100 local and foreign researchers, university students, interns, and volunteers yearly. It participates in conferences and in international research groups.

Some of the international avant-garde artists and art-groups who are in the Artpool Archives, and have exhibited and lectured there include: Fluxus artists Ben Vautier, Dick Higgins, Geoffrey Hendricks, Endre Tót, Robert Watts, Jean-Jacques Lebel, Ray Johnson sound poets and performers Jaap Blonk, Paul Panhuysen, Bernard Heidsieck, Tibor Papp, Julien Blaine, Ernst Jandl, mail art and artist's book artists Guglielmo Achille Cavellini, Buster Cleveland, Ginny Lloyd, Anna Banana, Vittore Baroni, Guy Bleus, John Held, Jr., Barbara Rosenthal.

== History ==
=== Antecedents ===
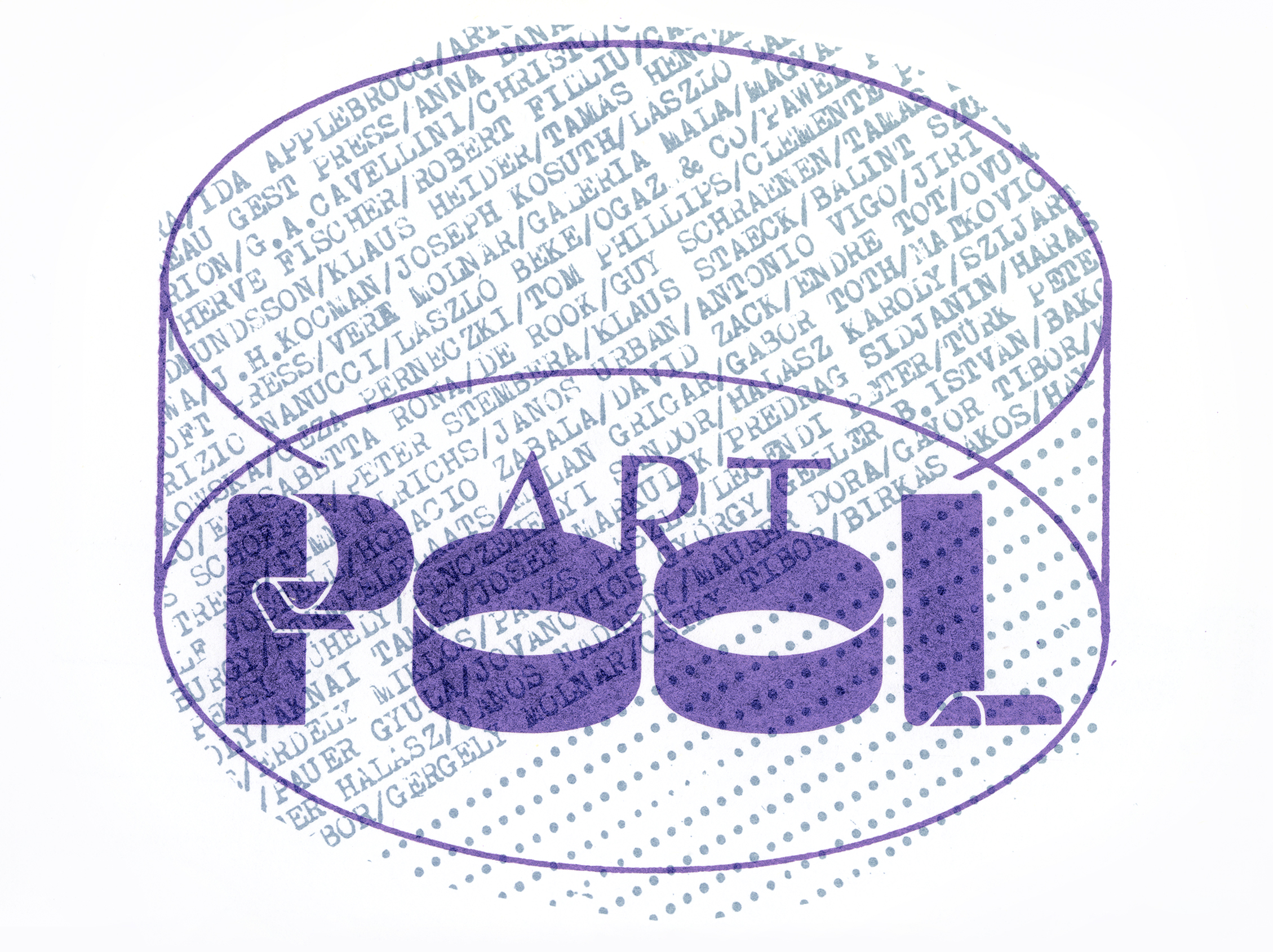
A piece from Artpool's first postcard series

It was founded, and is still run, by György Galántai and Júlia Klaniczay, as an offshoot of György's Chapel Studio in Balatonboglár, which functioned as an independent venue and presented various groups of neo-avant-garde artists from Hungary as well as from Yugoslavia and Czechoslovakia. In addition to the desire to preserve and continue the heritage of the Chapel Studio in Balatonboglár, the surprising amount of responses and exchange materials received as a reaction to the publication of György Galántai, Antecedents, also inspired the foundation of Artpool in 1979. Antecedents was the poster catalog documenting Galántai's 1978 Book Objects exhibition, which was opened by Anna Banana. The catalog included the stamp: "Please send information about your activity" and was sent to hundreds of addresses Galántai and Klaniczay collected previously.

=== 1979-1992 ===
Artpool functioned in the studio flat of Galántai and Klaniczay for 13 years as an underground institution. In addition to maintaining and developing the archive Artpool organized several international mail art projects and exhibitions in various small galleries and clubs in Hungary, and published numerous catalogs and periodicals. It organized two "Art Tours", first to Italy in 1979 and a West-European round trip in 1982 to establish personal contacts and exchange publications with artists who they got in contact through the mail art network. Reports on this second Art Tour were published in the first four issues of Artpool Letter and in the 5th issue of Artpool Radio.

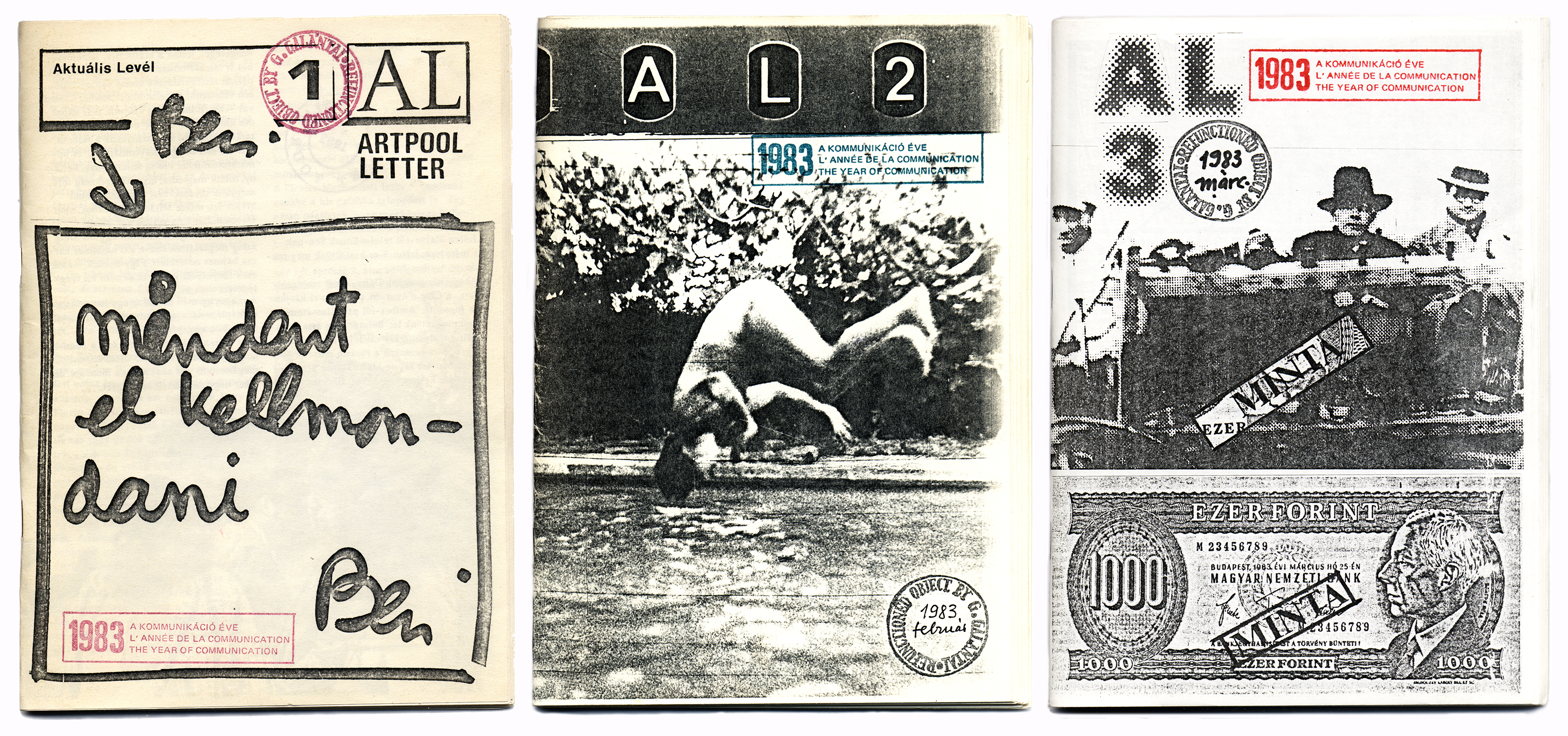
The covers of the first three issue of Artpool Letter

Inspired by Robert Filliou's concept of the Eternal Network Artpool organized 14 exhibitions at different venues under the heading "Artpool’s Periodical Space" (APS) between 1979 and 1984. The exhibitions Everybody with Anybody (1982), the World Art Post with the participation of 550 artists from 35 countries (1982), the Telephone Concert with the participation of Robert Adrian X (1983), as well as the exhibition Hungary Can Be Yours (1984) which was the last officially banned art exhibition in Hungary, and which was restaged more times after the Regime Change.

Between 1983 and 1985 Artpool published 11 issues of Aktuális Levél (Artpool Letter), an underground (samizdat) art magazine which was an important source on the parallel culture of that time in Hungary. Produced with a photocopier in 300-500 copies Artpool Letter released documents, reports, and interviews on local as well as international art events. Artpool also issued a thematic cassette series distributed through international exchange under the name Artpool Radio.

Further significant Artpool projects: Textile without Textile (1979), the first assembling published in Hungary, Homage to Vera Mukhina (1980), performance with Júlia Klaniczay and G. A. Cavellini in the Heroes' Square Budapest, Buda Ray University (1982-1997), which was a several year-long correspondence art project, and the Marcel Duchamp Symposion (1987). Artpool also participated in the Amsterdam festival Europe Against the Current in 1989.

=== 1992-2015 ===
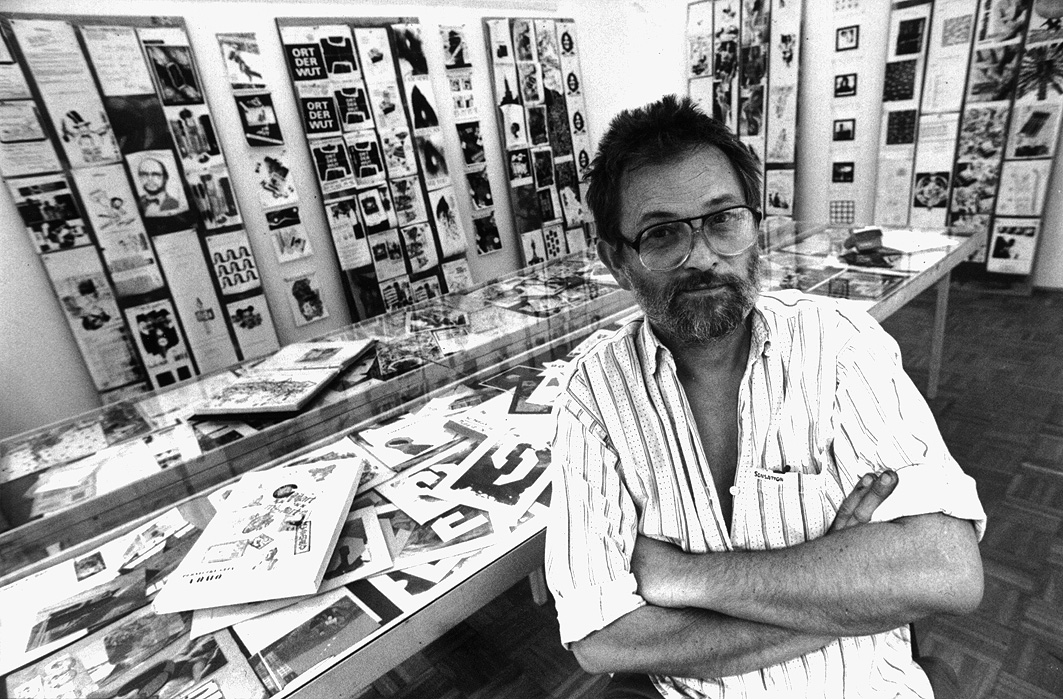
György Galántai with the exhibition organized from the material of Budapest Session of the 1992 Decentralized World Wide Networker Congress and Artpool's first fax action in the background

Following the change of the regime in Hungary, Artpool's former semi-official operation was replaced by non-profit institutional status and the Artpool Art Research Center was opened in 1992. The new institution defined itself as an art archive, research space, art library and bookstore, continuing its previous activities in a new cultural environment, supported by the Budapest Municipal Council. The city provided Artpool a property at Liszt Ferenc square, where the most significant part of the archive, the research space and the library was located between 1992 and 2020. As a continuation of its former enedevors and also reflecting on its new public status, Artpool started the systematic research and presentation of the avant-garde art of the seventies and the eighties. Artpool has also sustained the consequent documentation and archiving of contemporary art and the organization of art projects. The institution maintained its collaborations with prominent actors of the international art world, by inviting many of them to public events in Budapest, including Ben Vautier, John Held or Jean-Jacques Lebel.

Artpool's activities in the 1990s and 2000s were characterized by annual conceptual themes developed by György Galántai. In the nineties it presented important historical trends related to its own activity and collection (e.g. 1993: The Year of Fluxus; 1995: The Year of Performance; 1998: The Year of Installation; etc.), while the program of the 2000s was organized around the conceptual interpretation of the numerals in the post-millennium dates (e.g. 2000: The Year of Chance; 2001: The Year of the Impossible; 2002: The Year of Doubt [in Hungarian the word for "doubt" contains the word for "two"]; etc.).

In the 1990s Artpool organized a number of public events in the Liszt Ferenc Square, such as the Fluxus Flags open air exhibition in 1992; the BEN (vauTiER) SQUARE project, performance, and discussion in 1993; or the Loose Slogans board-exhibition in 1994. Artpool's Budapest based exhibition space called Artpool P60 was opened in 1997 and provided a venue to organize regular events, talks, and exhibitions, such as the reconstruction of Robert Filliou's Poipoidrom as part of the Year of Installation in 1998; the presentation of artists' money in the exhibition Money after Money in 2000; or the exhibition entitled Impossible Realism in 2001. Artpool's website was launched at the end of 1995 and served as a new interface for Artpool's projects as an expanded online space for previous networking and telecommunication activities. Following György Galántai's concept and design, the website was created and is still being developed on the basis of the structural-formal peculiarities of early HTML-language. It represents both an interface for Artpool's archival operation and a medium of creative experimentations with the possibilities of hypertextuality.

Artpool has been organizing exhibitions in Kapolcs, a small town in the countryside of Hungary, since 1991. The continuation of the program of the Newkapolcs Gallery, operating between 1991 and 1995 was taken over by the Galántai House (K55) in 2009, and from 2015 on Artpool's presence in Kapolcs was expanded with the venue "Area 51". The visibility of Artpool's program in Kapolcs was strengthened by the Kapolcs Art Days, and later on the program of the Valley of Arts Festival. Artpool's exhibition venues in Kapolcs feature audio-visual presentations and experimental curatorial projects by György Galántai with samples from the archive and the collection.

=== 2015- ===
In 2015 the collection of Artpool became an independent unit of the Museum of Fine Arts in Budapest, as part of the Data and Documentation Department of the museum. The integration became inevitable due to the fact that from the 2000s on it was not possible to raise funds for Artpool's steady operation as a non-profit institution, so it became essential to develop a new funding strategy. The relationship between Artpool and the Museum of Fine Arts can be traced back to the eighties: Galántai designed a poster for the museum already in 1981. The first major collaboration between the two institutions was the artistamp exhibition entitled Stamp Images in 1987; which was followed twenty years later by the exhibition Parastamp – Four Decades of Artistamps from Fluxus to the Internet in 2007. Negotiations on the integration of Artpool's collection into the Museum of Fine Arts began around 2005, and got realized in 2015. The year 2020 marks another turning point in Artpool's history: by the end of this year, Artpool has become part of the Central European Research Institute for Art History (KEMKI), a newly established sub-institution of the Museum of Fine Arts in Hungary, integrating the documentation and archival departments of both the museum and the Hungarian National Gallery.
