= John Held Jr. (mailartist) =

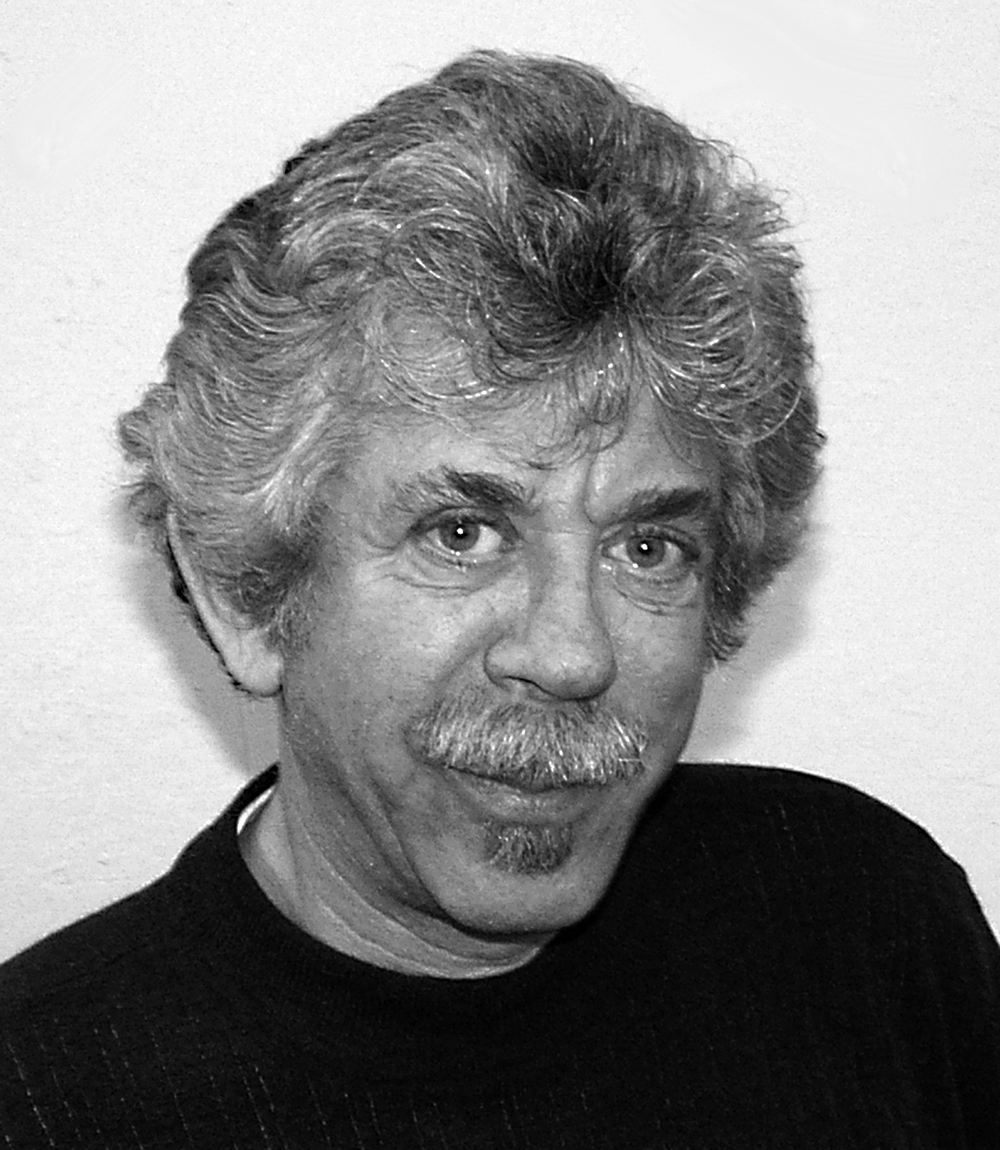
- John Held Jr.
- Born: 1947 (age 78–79); New York, United States
- Other name: Jon Held
- Known for: Mail art

John Held Jr. (born 1947 in New York, USA), is an American mailartist, author and performance artist who has been an active participant in alternative art since 1975, particularly in the fields of rubber stamp art, zine culture, and artistamps. He is one of the most prominent and respected promoters and chroniclers of mail art.

Vittore Baroni has written of him, "He has been called the James Boswell of mail art and indeed, like the renowned collaborator of writer Samuel Johnson, John Held Jr is the best biographer (and bibliographer) that postal art has ever known or might ever have desired."

== Artist-Curator ==
Held has 'done mail art' and maintained a worldwide circle of contacts since 1976. He has contributed to innumerable projects and shows spanning more than three decades. His mail artwork utilizes rubber stamps, artistamps, collage and copy art techniques, and he is also a noted performance artist. He has traveled extensively to realize individual and collaborative art actions, and his many performance pieces include Shadow Project at Hiroshima and Kyoto, Japan (1986), and Rrose Mutt at the Time of Change Festival in Minden, Germany (2000).

He is based in San Francisco, USA, where he directs the Modern Realism Gallery and Archive. He has curated mail art shows and solo exhibitions throughout the world, most notably Stampworks, the first exhibition at the Stempelplaats Gallery, Amsterdam (1976), Artistamps in Tartu, Soviet Union (1989), Mail Art at the Palace of Fine Arts, Havana, Cuba (1995), Bay Area Dada at Printed Matter in New York City (1999), Peace Island at Jeju Island, South Korea (2001), American Artistamps at the Stendhal Gallery, New York City (2010) American Artistamps, and BMC to DIY, a Celebration of Black Mountain College Artists at Asheville, North Carolina, USA (2010). In June 1997 he had a solo exhibition of his mail art work in Guy Bleus ' E-Mail Art Archives, Center for Visual Arts in Hasselt, Belgium.

He was curator at the Stamp Art Gallery in San Francisco from 1995 to 1998, and produced numerous catalogs and multiples relating to the twentieth century avant-garde in collaboration with director Picasso Gaglione. These years at the Stamp Art Gallery were the subject of the Stendhal Gallery, New York City exhibition, Greetings from Daddaland: Fluxus, Mail Art and Rubber Stamps (2010), curated for Ever Gold Gallery, San Francisco (2010) "Debris from the Cultural Underground". This show featured memorabilia from the Mailart movement, The Bay Area Dadaists as well as Held's own artwork Curated for Ever Gold Gallery, San Francisco (2011) "Beat by the Bay" an historical look at San Francisco's 1950's Beat artists and their galleries. In 2013, he co-curated an art exhibition with Andrew McClintock titled Gutai Historical Survey and Contemporary Response at the San Francisco Art Institute's Walter and McBean Galleries.

A play was written about his life titled "With Held" by playwright/actor Jeremy Julian Greco and was performed for several years in the San Francisco area circa 2010–2014.

== Author ==
He has written several influential books about mail art including Mail Art: An Annotated Bibliography and Rubber Stamp Art, and has contributed to many of the seminal works about mail art and networking published in recent decades, including At a Distance: Precursors to Art and Activism on the Internet, Chuck Welch's Eternal Network, A Mail Art Anthology, and H.R. Fricker's I am a Networker (Sometimes). More recently, he published Zinelandia: Cover Art From the Factsheet Five Era (1982-1998), which highlights covers of zines selected from his personal collection, and includes a short essay about Factsheet Five and zine culture in the 1980s to 1990s.

As a staff writer for the art magazine SFAQ, he contributed more than fifty feature articles and reviews, including interviews with poet Lawrence Ferlinghetti, painter Robert Bechtle, and dancer Anna Halprin, as well as Move Your Archive, a four-part series on the importance of archiving and strategies for documenting and preserving various artistic materials.

He has also authored many magazine articles and catalog essays for mail art and artistamp exhibitions, and has played a significant role in the encouragement and reception of mail art and alternative artistic genres within leading cultural institutions and publications throughout the world. Facets of his collection have been placed at the Getty Research Library (Los Angeles) and the Museum of Modern Art (New York) and his papers are in The Archives of American Art, Smithsonian Institution (Washington DC).

== Researcher-Lecturer ==
He has carried out researches, and collects and institutionalizes relics and documents of the later twentieth century avant-garde, and worked for 25 years as an art librarian in New York State, Maryland and Dallas, Texas.

In 1977, he conducted an interview with Ray Johnson, the "Father of Mail Art", and has also interviewed the other Fluxus related artists, John Cage (1993), and Allan Kaprow (1994).

He has lectured about mail art and avant-garde publications at the Victoria & Albert Museum, London, UK (1993), and at the National Academy of Fine Arts, Prague, Czech Republic (1994). His lecture at the State Center of Contemporary Art, Moscow, Russia (2003) accompanied his exhibition of Russian Futurist inspired works at the Mayakovsky State Museum.
