= Guy Bleus =

Belgian artist (born 1950)

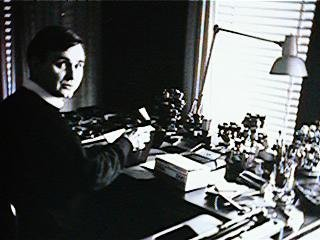
- Bleus in 1985
- Born: Guy Bleus; October 23, 1950 (age 75); Hasselt, Belgium
- Known for: olfactory art, fax art, installation, artistamp, artists books
- Movement: Mail art Performance art
- Website: mailart.be

Guy Bleus (born October 23, 1950) is a Belgian artist, archivist and writer. He is associated with olfactory art, visual poetry, performance art and the mail art movement.

His work covers different areas, including administration (which he calls Artministration), postal and olfactory communication.

== Art and archive ==
Bleus was born on October 23, 1950, in Hasselt. In 1978, he founded The Administration Centre – 42.292 which became a huge art archive with the works and information of 6000 artists from more than 60 countries. "Guy Bleus has one of the finest archives of mail art in Europe, if not the world."

Bleus was the first artist who systematically used scents in plastic arts. In 1978, he wrote the olfactory manifesto The Thrill of Working with Odours in which he deplores the lack of interest in scents in the visual arts. Since then he showed smell paintings, mailed perfumed objects and made aromatic installations; he also created spray performances where he sprayed a mist of fragrance over the audience.

Exploring the possibilities of communication media as art media, he investigated the postal system in Indirect correspondence (1979) and searched for an alternative postal system in Airmail by balloons. Together with Charles François he was a pioneer using a computer connected to a modem for artistic communication (in 1989). He also applied reproduction media such as Microfilm, CD-ROM and DVD-ROM for artistic reasons.

== Performance works ==
One of his performance works from the 1980s was documented in the artists' periodical Force Mental. The performance took place in the venue Il Ventuno in Hasselt, and is described as follows: "Guy Bleus wears a costume made of official stamps of 1/2fr. He cuts his moustache into a Hitler-moustache. Against the wall he hangs photocopies of Hitler's head. Enlargements whereby the moustache is growing bigger (till A3 format). Bleus sticks then stamps, the same as of which his costume is made of and stamps them with his number-stamp: 42.292. Then he sticks a naked girl full with stamps of 1/2fr and stamps them with the number stamp. Finally he cuts off his Hitler-moustache and breaks a mirror."

Another fascinating performance of Bleus is called 'Value Shredder' (1982, Brussels, Gallery Entr'Act). Bleus took hundreds of real 50 Belgian franc banknotes and made a suit out of them. Wearing this suit he began his performance. He gave the audience plastic raincoats to put on and asked them to hand over their identity cards. He put the cards into a paper shredder, then tore up Mein Kampf and threw the pages into the shredder too. When everything was completely shredded he blew odours and flour over the public with a fan. Finally, he removed his suit and set it on fire. After the performance the public received an identity card from planet Mars. A life-size photo of Bleus's money suit is part of the art collection of the National Bank of Belgium (NBB).

To honor the Italian artist Guglielmo Achille Cavellini Guy Bleus organized the four-day "Cavellini Festival 1984" in the cities of Antwerp, Brussels, Eeklo, Hasselt, and Tienen. In the administrative performance "First President of the USE" in Brussels, capital of Europe, Bleus officially declared Cavellini the very first president of the United States of Europe.

== Networking and projects ==
Numerous are the international art projects Bleus has organised, such as Are you experienced? L.H.F.S. (1981), W.A.A.: Mail eARTh Atlas (1981–83), Telegraphy (1983), Aerograms (1984), Cavellini Festival 1984, Art is Books (1991), Fax Performances (1992–1993), Private Art Detective: Sealed Confessions, and Building Plans & Schemes (1993).

He wrote and published many essays on the subject of networking art. About his essay Exploring Mail Art (1984), Géza Perneckzy wrote: “The study of Guy Bleus outranks all other publications with its theoretical weight and conciseness.” Moreover, he contributed to significant publications, such as Piotr Rypson's Mail Art, Chuck Welch's Eternal Network, A Mail Art Anthology, or Vittore Baroni's Postcards – Cartoline d’artista. He participated in many artists' periodicals.

From 1994 to 1999, he opened in Hasselt the art gallery E-Mail-Art Archives. In this non-profit space more than 40 events of mail art, fax art and Internet art took place. Artists such as Ben Vautier, Shozo Shimamoto, Anna Banana, Julien Blaine, H.R. Fricker and Clemente Padin were exhibited.

In 1995, he edited The Artistamp Collection, the first mail art catalogue on CD-ROM. With the participation of networking artists such as Vittore Baroni, Ken Friedman, John Held Jr., Ruud Janssen, György Galántai, Pawel Petasz and Géza Perneczky, he published in 1997 the first E-Mail-Art & Internet-Art Manifesto, an issue of his electronic zine.

After a bureaucratic venture of 20 years he realised in 2003 (together with Jean Spiroux) the very first postage stamp on the theme mail art edited by an official Postal Service. It was an edition of 4 million copies realised by the Belgian Postal Service.

In 2005 and 2006, Bleus organised the olfactory mail art project Scents, Locks & Kisses with 778 artists from 43 countries in the Art Museum Z33. The website is a slideshow with all the works of the participating artists.

A retrospective of his work was held in the Cultural Centre of Hasselt in 2010. The publication Pêle-Mêle: Guy Bleus® – 42.292 had bracts perfumed with lavender essence and included a re-edition of his ID from planet Mars of 1979.

== Bibliography ==
- Gajewski, H. Mail Art Handbook, The Open University, Amsterdam, 1983
- Rypson, P. Mail-Art – Czyli Sztuka Poczty, Akademia Ruchu, Warszawa, 1985
- Welch, C. Networking Currents, Sandbar Willow Press, Boston, 1986
- Truck, Fred. Guy Bleus, in: The Memory Bank, Des Moines University, 1986
- Ruch, G. (editor). MA-Congress 86, Out-press, Geneva, 1987
- Fricker, H.R. I Am A Networker (Sometimes) , St. Gallen 1989
- Held, J. World Bibliography of Mail Art, Dallas Public Library, 1989
- Broi, G. La posta in gioco. La comunicazione postale come creatività artistica, Pres. del consiglio del ministri, Florence, 1990
- Held, J. Mail Art: An Annotated Bibliography, (Foreword: G.Bleus), Scarecrow Press, 1991.
- Rypson, P. Mail-Art – Czyli Sztuka Poczty, National Museum, Warszawa, 1991
- Laszlo, J.-N. Timbres d'artistes, Musée de la Poste, Paris, 1993
- Meyer, P. Mailed Art in Uppsala, Upsala, 1994
- Urbons, K. Elektrografie, DuMont Buchverlag, Cologne, 1994
- Welch, C. Eternal Network: A Mail-Art Anthology, Alberta, University of Calgary Press, 1994
- Held, J. (Ed.), Guy Bleus: Selected Writings, Stamp Art Gallery, San Francisco, 1996
- Hamard-Wang, N. Mail Art Networking, entre communication et esthétique, Université de Paris, 1996
- Baroni, V. Arte Postale: Guida al network della corrispondenza creativa, Bertiolo, 1997
- Perneczky, G. Mail Art: An Essay, in Rampike, Vol. 8 # 2, 1997
- Held, J. Rubber Stamp Art, Bertiolo, AAA-edizioni, 1999
- Felter, J.W. Artistamps – Francobolli d’Artista, Bertiolo, AAA Edizioni, 2000
- Löbach-Hinweiser, B. Artists’ Banknote Works, Cremlinge, 2000
- Saper, Craig J. Networked Art, University of Minnesota Press, 2001
- Castellin, Ph. Doc(k)s : mode d'emploi - histoire, formes & sens des poésies expérimentales au XXe siècle, Ed. Al Dante, Paris, 2002. ISBN 2-911073-97-5
- Siegmann, R. Mail Art, Art postal – Art posté, Paris, 2002
- Perneczky, G. Correspondence Works & Labels, Köln, 2003
- Blaine, J. Mail Art 2003, VAC, Ventabren art contemporain, 2003
- Starbuck, M.K. Clashing and Converging: Effects of the Internet on the Correspondence Art Network, Austin, University of Texas, 2003
- Chandler, A. & Neumark, N. (Ed.). At a distance: precursors to art and activism on the Internet, MIT Press, Cambridge (MA), 2005
- Baccelli, V. Arte Postale – Mail art, Tesseratto Editore, Seville (E), 2009
- Lomholt, N.P. & Denhart, L.A. Lomholt Mail Art Archive, Formular Press, Denmark, 2010
- Gutiérrez Marx, G. Artecorreo: Artistas Invisibles en La Red Postal 1975–1995, Buenos Aires, Luna Verde, 2010
- Sousa, P. (Merzmail). Mail Art – La Red Eterna, L.U.P.I., Sestao, 2011
- Held, J. Where the Secret is Hidden: Collected Essays, 1979–2011 – Part 1 & 2, Bananafish Publications, Sacramento and San Francisco, California, 2011
- Bleus, G. Social Mail-Art, in: Boschi, A. 50 Years of Mail Art: 1962–2012, Museo Civico e della Mail Art di Montecarotto, p. 46-47, 2012
- dj readies (Craig J.Saper). Intimate Bureaucracies: A Manifesto, Brooklyn, NY: punctum books, 2012. ISBN 978-0615612034
- Holsbeek, D. Guy Bleus, in: Landscape of Images, ed. Eurlings, Ellen (e.a.), Hasselt, 2012. ISBN 9789074605557
- Chiarlone Debenedetti, B. Art through Postal Service, Gruppo Editoriale L'Espresso S.p.A., ilmiolibri, Roma, 2013
- Galántai G. & Klaniczay J. (Ed.). Artpool: The Experimental Art Archive of East-Central Europe, Budapest, 2013. ISBN 978-963-08-7225-6
- Crombez, T. Arm theater in een gouden tijd. Ritueel en avant-garde na de Tweede Wereldoorlog, Lannoo, Leuven, 2014. ISBN 978-94-0141-711-2
- Ramon, R. Vorm & Visie. Geschiedenis van de Concrete en Visuele Poëzie in Nederland en Vlaanderen, Poëziecentrum, Ghent, 2014. ISBN 978-9056550851
- Pianowski, F. Análisis Histórico del Arte Correo en América Latina, Universitat de Barcelona, 2014
- Held, J. Small Scale Subversion: Mail Art & Artistamps, TAM-Publications, Breda, 2015. ISBN 978-1-329-05805-7
- Sarenco, Benetton L., De Vree J. Visual Poetry in Europe, imago mundi, Luciano Benetton Collection, Antiga Edizioni, 2016. ISBN 889-9657319
- Bleus, G. Communication: 44 Statements, in: Cook, S. (ed.), Information, Whitechapel: Documents of Contemporary Art, The MIT Press, 2016. ISBN 978-0-262-52934-1
- Pas, J. Artists' Publications: The Belgian Contribution, Koenig Books, London, 2017. ISBN 978-3960-98-1978
- Vuegen, Ch. Artministrator Guy Bleus in CIAP, Hasselt, in: H Art magazine # 178, 22/02/2018, p. 10
- Rota, A. Mail Art: l'eternal network dell'arte postale, Università Ca'Foscari Venezia, 2018.
- Wilson-Brown S., Smell Is All Around Us, in : "The Global Impacts and Roles of Immersive Media", ed. by J. Ford Morie & K. McCallum, IGI Global; Hershey PA, 2019 ISBN 978-1799824336

== Publications by Guy Bleus-42.292 ==
=== Artists’ books, magazines and catalogues ===
- Subterranean II, Academy of Arts, Ghent, 1970
- Het Spiegelbeeld, Tongerse Kunstkring, Tongeren, 1974
- Subterranean II, Tongerse Kunstkring, Tongeren, 1975
- Are You Experienced: L.H.F. S., VUB, university, Brussels, 1981
- Mail-eARTh, De Warande, Turnhout, 1981
- Book of Scents, TAC-42.292, Wellen, 1982
- Arbeidsreglement, TAC-42.292, Wellen, 1982
- Mail-Art: Initiation, Ciap, Hasselt, 1983
- Administration: Telegraphy and Mail Art Project, Provinciaal Museum, Hasselt, 1983
- Man is The Museum of All Things, Esmeralda, Ghent, 1983
- W.A.A.: World Art Atlas, De Warande, Turnhout, 1983
- B:13 – Bambú 13, TAC-42.292, Wellen, 1984 (1992)
- B.T.S. – Commonpress 56, Het Toreke, Tienen, 1984
- 20x Communication, SHIVKV, Genk, 1986
- Audio Art: Screams (Against Bureaucracy), Provinciaal Museum, Hasselt, 1989
- Art is Books: Artists’ Books, PCOB, Hasselt, 1990
- Huurboekje, Rent book, TAC-42.292, Wellen, 1990
- Mail-Art Manual Do Viajante em Portugal, Cultuurcentrum, Heusden-Zolder, 1991
- Fax-Performances, C.C. Heusden-Zolder, 1992
- A Networking Fax-Project & Performance, De Fabriek, Eindhoven, 1993
- Building Plans & Schemes, C.C. Heusden-Zolder, 1993
- The Timeless Calendar, Vaes & Il Ventuno, Neerpelt, Hasselt, 1993
- E-Pêle-Mêle: Electronic Mail-Art Netzine, TAC–42.292, Hasselt, 1994–1998
- Mail-Art: A Dialogue between the Postman and his Electronic Shadow, PCBK & TAC-42.292, Hasselt, 1994
- In a memory of Ray Johnson, TAC-42.292, Hasselt, 1995
- Mail-art Memorabilia, Postal Museum, Brussels, 1995
- The Artistamp Collection, Centrum voor Kunsten, Hasselt, 1995
- Sealed Confessions: Private Art Detective / Werken met geuren, The Thrill of Working with Odours, C.C. Heusden-Zolder, 1996
- Re: The E-Mail-Art & Internet-Art Manifesto, TAC-42.292, Hasselt, 1997
- Working in A Coal-Mine: Fax- & Internet-Art Project, Our House, Genk, 1997
- Re: The E-Mail-Art & Internet-Art Manifesto – Part II, TAC-42.292, Hasselt, 1998
- Kunstenaarsboeken, (artists’ books), Literair Museum, Hasselt, 1998

=== CD-ROM and DVD-ROM ===
- The Artistamp Collection: with an X, E-Mail-Art Archives, Hasselt, 1996
- The Artistamp Collection: without an X, E-Mail-Art Archives, Hasselt, 1996
- Eutopia, Het Gouvernement, Maastricht, 1997
- Desks: 1001 Bureaus, Centrum Beeldende Kunst, Groningen, 1998
- 1899 Gezelle 1999, Visual poetry – Net poetry, Bruges, 1999
- Artbiorix, De Velinx, Tongeren, 2000
- S:L:K – Olfactory Mail Art project, Z33, Hasselt, 2005
