= Ginny Lloyd =

American artist

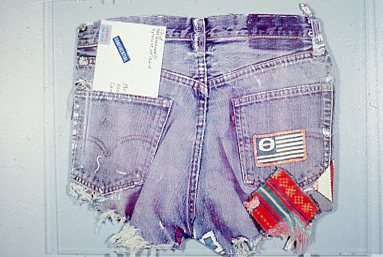
3D color copy art by Ginny Lloyd

Ginny Lloyd (born 1945, Maryland, US) is an American artist, noted for her work with mail art, photocopy art, performance art and photography. She organized the Copy Art Exhibition in San Francisco in 1980 with programming devoted to promoting xerography. Her work was included in the exhibition, From Bonnard to Baselitz: A Decade of Acquisitions by the Prints Collection 1978–1988 and listed annually since 1992 in Benezit Dictionary of Artists.

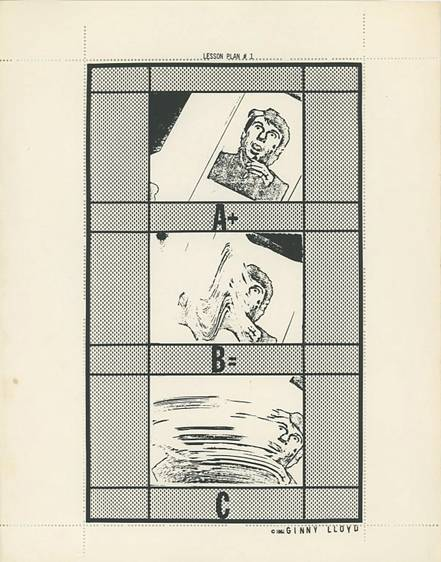

== Career ==
Ginny began exhibiting her photography during the 1970s when she obtained a Nikon camera and learned darkroom printing. She used models in surreal compositions and environments, gaining recognition with awards and magazine coverage. Many were in a large format, hand tinted series. She became interested in computer imagery using technology themes in her art production in the 1970s, having learned programming languages while earning a graduate degree at Syracuse University. In late 1979 and the early 1980s she became an expert in the use of copy machines to make art (Let’s Make Copy Art workbook). In 1982 she used a Gravitronics system which led to larger opportunities such as: a space center residency, teaching computer graphics at Ohlone College in Fremont, CA (CAD, PC paint, and Macintosh desktop publishing), Director position at the Macintosh Business Training Center, and a career developing training for employees and customers of numerous startups and corporations in the Silicon Valley/San Francisco Bay Area corridor through 2007.

As a visiting artist in 1981, Lloyd worked at the Image Resource Center in Cleveland to create the first color Xerox billboard art assisted by the Cleveland Institute of Art printmaking faculty, Alexander Aitken. This was her third copy art billboard exploring the use of Xerox copiers in large formats. She continued to produce billboards nationally participating in The Art Billboard Project documented in her book Billboard Art. She currently advises artists on the art of making billboards.

In 1983, as part of the New Mexico Artist in Residence Program, supported by NASA and National Endowment for the Arts (NEA), Lloyd worked with the International Space Hall of Fame creating a multimedia performance including a talking computer, lasers and a bank of video monitors. In 1984, Lloyd was involved with a project called Space: The Frontier Gallery with artists Mike Mages, Sam Samore, and Aron Ranen. In collaboration, referring to the event as Art in Space, the artists hosted a rocket launch in which artworks were micro-processed into a microchip and placed inside a rocket to be launched in Potrero del Sol Park in San Francisco. She continued her space-themed art and participated in Stellar at the Minnesota Center for Book Arts and in Revolutions at Endeavor Arts Gallery in CANADA. Her prints were included in the subsequent crewed Space Mission STS-133 (2011) and the BENNU Space Mission on OSIRIS-REx spacecraft (2016).

In 1983, Blitzkunst : 54 artists of our era portrayed and questioned was published by Kretschmer & Grossmann in Frankfurt Germany in English and German, with introductions by Judith Hoffberg, Carl Loeffler, and Hal Fisher. For the project, Lloyd photographed and published interviews with 54 artists working across a variety of formats and media including many of the mail artists she corresponded with including Anna Banana, Vittore Baroni, Monty Cantsin, Ulises Carrión, Cavellini, and Stefan Eins. The book has been used as a foundation reference by subsequent mail art interview books.

=== Curating ===
In 1980, over 100 international artists (many affiliated with mail art) participated in a copy art exhibition Lloyd curated in San Francisco. In the gallery was a store and access to free copy machines. It later traveled to The Netherlands, Germany, San Jose and Japan. It was for that show she made her first copy art billboard, and developed European contacts for her Tour ’81 project, visiting many artists in the mail art community in Western and Eastern Europe. While in Europe she tended the Documenta 7 Fashion Moda of New York store upon invitation from Jenny Holzer and Stefan Eins to curate items made by West Coast artists for the store project.

Upon her return to San Francisco she created the Storefront, a one-year living art project; holding art events and installations in a storefront window. Local and international guest artists collaborated in the project. Each month a new installation art, exhibition, and/or performance, lived in the space, compiled writings and resulting art into a book. From this space artists launched several projects i.e.: Neoist Monty Cantsin’s Blood Campaign, an early artistamp exhibit, Gaglione’s first rubber stamp store, Hollywood Confidential James Dean Mail Art show, Buster Cleveland paintings, copy art React/Reagieren project, and the Daily Mail art exhibit are just a few.

As an outgrowth of her early stamp collecting activities her Gina Lotta Post Artistamp Museum and Archive grew into one of the largest comprehensive collections of original artistamps online. It includes historical documents of official recognition, exhibits and events, books, catalogs, correspondence and articles about artistamp creators. It has grown to over 5,000 artistamp sheets from 250+ international artists; seen by over 118,500 visitors to date. Women in the Artistamp Spotlight, a book that evolved out of the collection chronicles 30 women artists. The collection’s contents are displayed in a six-volume publication supplementing the online showcase, making the contents available for public view.

=== Events ===
In 1984 she organized the successful Inter DADA 84, a one-week DADA event throughout the city of San Francisco’s art spaces. Local and international artists attended and participated. It was the largest gathering of mail artists at the time. It included performances, art shows, films, open mike events, dinner, parade, and more. She obtained sponsorship from the Goethe Institute, San Francisco Arts Commission, Italian Museum, Canadian Consulate, and private grants. Inter DADA 84: True DADA Confessions contains memoirs, reports, and photos/art of events from many of the participating artists.

Ginny also organized the Inter Florida Fluxus Tour (2010), a performance tour of Fluxus performances by artists Reid Wood, Reed Altemus, Bibiana Maltos, and Keith Buchholz in Florida. Performances took place at the Salvador Dalí Museum, Artpool, Kennedy Space Center, Jaffe Center for Book Arts, Burt Reynolds Museum, and other Florida locations. The Jaffe published a special edition of scores written by the artists titled FLUXUS.

=== Teaching, advising and writing ===
Ginny has been teaching since her early computer graphics classes at Ohlone College in Fremont, California (1987–1988). Her copy art workshops have been held at UC Berkeley, Hayward, and SF State University. Also Jan Van Eyck Academie, Academie Aki in The Netherlands, and Jaffe Center for Book Arts. She was a recent guest panelist at Ex Postal Facto held in 2014 at the San Francisco Library and presenter at the Martin County Cultural Center in Stuart, Florida.

During her travels in Europe, Tour ’81, she visited numerous archives created by the European mail artists. She served as mail art archive advisor at the JES Archive in San Francisco from 1982 to 1984. She provided advice on the book Correspondence Art: Source Book for the Network of International Postal Art Activity, researching and providing imagery as examples of mail art. Ginny has also served as copy art advisor to the Xerox Corporation Historical Archives, and archive consultant for San Francisco’s 100 Year DADA Fair (2016).

She has written articles for:

- Popular Photography. Lloyd, Ginny. 2006. “Best of Everglades” Popular Photography New York, NY
- Popular Photography Lloyd, Ginny. 2008. “Montana Trek Recap”. Popular Photography New York, NY
- Women Artists News. Lloyd, Ginny. “Women and the Copy Machine”. Women Artists News. - 7 (6):11-12 (Summer 1982)
- Art Com Magazine. Lloyd, Ginny. ” 5cents A Page”. Art Com Magazine - #4
- Umbrella Magazine. Lloyd, Ginny. 1982 “Copy Art: Europe and San Francisco”. San Francisco, CA.
- Umbrella Magazine – Vol 5, #4. Los Angeles, CA. Lloyd, Ginny. “The Mail Art Community in Europe”. Umbrella Magazine – Vol 5, #1. Los Angeles, CA
- L'ère du copie-art. Lloyd, Ginny 1981. L'ère du copie-art. 2e éd. Copy Art article for catalog, Quebec, CANADA
- The Monthly: An Irregular Periodical Vol 1 - 4. San Francisco, CA. Lloyd Productions. 1980
- Newsletter M.Y.A. 2016 #3. Edited by Vittore Baroni / Archive E.O.N. and Claudio Romeo / DodoDada. "A Collector's Thoughts". Feb 5, 2017.

More recently she has written several books about projects and marginal art.

=== Exhibits ===
Her photography has appeared on the cover of books, The Creative Camera, Soup, two issues of San Francisco's Music Calendar and most recently with the best selling memoir Fairyland. The cover photo received rave reviews from The New Yorker, and was used on the covers of subsequent translations.

The Carbon Alternative an exhibit organized by the Jaffe Book Arts Center at Florida Atlantic University was library-wide in October, 2010 Carbon Alternative review. This included her copy art, books, and other mail art pieces from her collection and in the Jaffe.

In 2016 City Lights book store sponsored the Most DADA Thing exhibit of her Inter DADA 84 collection at the San Francisco Library’s History Center during the DADA World Fair.

==== Other select solo exhibitions ====
- Bongiani Ophen Art Museum di Salerno - Room 43. Salerno, ITALY. 2013
- San Francisco Camerawork Gallery, San Francisco, CA, 1985
- Space Hall of Fame, Alamogordo, NM, 1983
- Ken Damy Photogallery, Brescia. ITALY, 1982
- Fokus Gallery, Berlin, GERMANY, 1982
- Image Resource Center, Cleveland, OH, 1981
- Electro Arts Gallery at Studio 718, San Francisco, CA, 1980

==== Select group exhibitions ====
- Minnesota Center for Book Arts – Fluxjob, Minneapolis, MN, 2014
- NY Art Book Fair - Printed Matter at MOMA PS1, NYC, NY, 2013
- Davidson Galleries – Exlibris, Seattle, WA, 2012
- Museum of Contemporary Art and Lithuanian Museum, Textile 11 / Kaunas Biennale - George Maciunas and Beyond: Fluxus Never Stops, Chicago, and LITHUANIA, 2011
- National Museum of Contemporary Art. Seoul, KOREA 2011
- Museum of Contemporary Art – AUSTRALIA. Sydney, AUSTRALIA, 2011
- Art Museum of the Canton of Thurgen, SWITZERLAND, 2011
- Budapest Museum of Fine Arts – Parastamps. Budapest, HUNGARY, 2007
- San Francisco Main Library - Bay Area Dada: Before Punk and Zines, San Francisco, CA, 1998
- Stamp Art Gallery - The First International Female Artistamp Exhibition, San Francisco, CA, 1997
- National Gallery, Ottawa, CANADA, 1988, 1987
- Fresno Art Museum, Fresno, CA, 1987
- Museum of Fine Arts - World Art Post. Budapest, HUNGARY, 1982
- 2nd Triennale International De Gravure, Barcelona, SPAIN, 1986
- San Jose Institute of Contemporary Art, San Jose, CA, 1985
- Moeglin-Delcroix, Anne. Livres d'artistes.: Centre Georges Pompidou/B.P.I, s.l. Herscher, Paris, FRANCE, 1985
- Postmachina. Bologna, ITALY, 1985
- Dallas Museum of Art, Dallas, TX., 1985
- Long Beach Museum of Art, Long Beach, CA, 1983
- Artforum, Frankfurt, GERMANY, 1983
- Biennale de Paris, Paris, FRANCE, 1982
- Kentucky Museum, Lexington, KY, 1982
- Nelson Gallery of Art at the Atkins Museum of Fine Arts – Repeated Exposure. Kansas City, MO, 1982
- Galerie Motivation, Montreal, CANADA, 1981
- ASUC, Berkeley, CA, 1981
- Colorado Photographic Arts Gallery, Denver, CO, 1979

== Permanent collections ==
Lloyd's artworks are held in the collections of the National Gallery of Australia, at Artistamp Museum of Artpool in Budapest, Otis Art Institute of Parsons School of Design, Joan Flasch Artist Book Collection at the Flaxman Library at the School of the Art Institute of Chicago, and Beinecke Rare Book & Manuscript Library at Yale University.
