= Xerox art =

Photography genre

Xerox art (sometimes, more generically, called copy art, electrostatic art, scanography or xerography) is an art form that began in the 1960s. Prints are created by putting objects on the glass, or platen, of a photocopier and by pressing "start" to produce an image. If the object is not flat, or the cover does not totally cover the object, or the object is moved, the resulting image is distorted in some way. The curvature of the object, the amount of light that reaches the image surface, and the distance of the cover from the glass, all affect the final image. Often, with proper manipulation, rather ghostly images can be made. Basic techniques include: Direct Imaging, the copying of items placed on the platen (normal copy); Still Life Collage, a variation of direct imaging with items placed on the platen in a collage format focused on what is in the foreground/background; Overprinting, the technique of constructing layers of information, one over the previous, by printing onto the same sheet of paper more than once; Copy Overlay, a technique of working with or interfering in the color separation mechanism of a color copier; Colorizing, vary color density and hue by adjusting the exposure and color balance controls; Degeneration is a copy of a copy degrading the image as successive copies are made; Copy Motion, the creation of effects by moving an item or image on the platen during the scanning process. Each machine also creates different effects.

== Accessible art ==
Xerox art appeared shortly after the first Xerox copying machines were made. It is often used in collage, mail art and book art. Publishing collaborative mail art in small editions of Xerox art and mailable book art was the purpose of International Society of Copier Artists (I.S.C.A.) founded in 1981 by Louise Odes Neaderland.

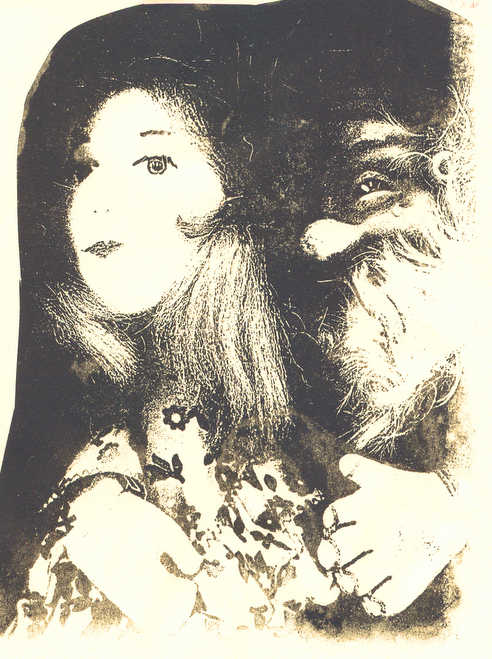
Puppets, a 2002 photo of a lithograph from xerographic direct imaging of two 20th century hand puppets

Throughout the history of copy art San Francisco and Rochester are mentioned frequently. Rochester was known as the Imaging Capital of the World with Eastman Kodak and Xerox, while many artists with innovative ideas created cutting edge works in San Francisco. Alongside the computer boom a copy art explosion was taking place. Copy shops were springing up all over San Francisco, and access to copiers made it possible to create inexpensive art of unique imagery. Multiple prints of assemblage and collage meant artists could share work more freely. Print on demand meant making books and magazines at the corner copy shop without censorship and with only a small outlay of funds. Comic book artists could quickly use parts of their work over and over.

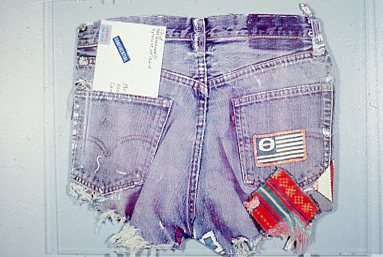
3D color copy art by Ginny Lloyd

== Early history 1960s–1970s ==
The first artists recognized to make copy art are Charles Arnold, Jr., and Wallace Berman. Charles Arnold, Jr., an instructor at Rochester Institute of Technology, made the first photocopies with artistic intent in 1961 using a large Xerox camera on an experimental basis. Berman, called the "father" of assemblage art, would use a Verifax photocopy machine (Kodak) to make copies of the images, which he would often juxtapose in a grid format. Berman was influenced by his San Francisco Beat circle and by Surrealism, Dada, and the Kabbalah. Sonia Landy Sheridan began teaching the first course in the use of copiers at the Art Institute of Chicago in 1970.

In the 1960s and 1970s, Esta Nesbitt was one of the earliest artists experimenting with xerox art. She invented three xerography techniques, named transcapsa, photo-transcapsa, and chromacapsa. Nesbitt worked closely with Anibal Ambert and Merle English at Xerox Corporation, and the company sponsored her art research from 1970 until 1972.

Seth Siegelaub and Jack Wendler made Untitled (Xerox Book) with artists Carl Andre, Robert Barry, Douglas Huebler, Joseph Kosuth, Sol LeWitt, Robert Morris, and Lawrence Weiner in 1968.

Copy artists' dependence upon the same machines does not mean that they share a common style or aesthetic. Artists as various as Ian Burn (a conceptual/process artist who made another Xerox Book in 1968), Laurie-Rae Chamberlain (a punk-inspired colour Xeroxer exhibiting in the mid 1970s) and Helen Chadwick (a feminist artist using her own body as subject matter in the 1980s) have employed photocopiers for very different purposes.

Other artists who have made significant use of the machines include: Carol Key, Sarah Willis, Joseph D. Harris, Tyler Moore, the Copyart Collective of Camden, as well as:

in continental Europe

- Guy Bleus
- Alighiero Boetti (Nove Xerox AnneMarie, 1969)
- Bruno Munari (Xerografie series, begun in 1963)
- M. Vänçi Stirnemann
- Vittore Baroni
- Piermario Ciani

in the UK

- Graham Harwood
- Tim Head
- David Hockney
- Alison Marchant
- Russell Mills

in Brazil

- Paulo Bruscky
- León Ferrari
- Hudinilson Jr.
- Eduardo Kac
- Letícia Parente
- Mário Ramiro

in Canada

- Evergon

in the US

- Pati Hill
- Ginny Lloyd
- Tom Norton
- Sonia Landy Sheridan
- Barbara T. Smith

Barbara T. Smith, a Los Angeles artist, leased a Xerox 914 and between 1967–1968 made thousands of Xeroxes which she used to make sculptures, unique artist's books and framed collages. In the mid-1970s Pati Hill did art experiments with an IBM copier. Hill's resulting xerox artwork was exhibited at Centre Pompidou, Paris, the Musée d’Art Moderne de la Ville de Paris, and the Stedelijk Museum, Amsterdam, among other venues in Europe and the US.

== Recognition of the art form ==
San Francisco had an active Xerox arts scene that started in 1976 at the LaMamelle gallery with the All Xerox exhibit and in 1980 the International Copy Art Exhibition, curated and organized by Ginny Lloyd, was also held at LaMamelle gallery. The exhibition traveled to San Jose, California, and Japan. Lloyd also made the first copy art billboard (the first of three) with a grant from Eyes and Ears Foundation.

A gallery named Studio 718 moved into the Beat poet area of San Francisco's North Beach neighborhood. It shared space in part with Postcard Palace, where several copy artists sold postcard editions; the space also housed a Xerox 6500. At around the same time color copy calendars produced in multiple editions made by Barbara Cushman sold at her store and gallery, A Fine Hand.

In the 1980, Marilyn McCray curated the Electroworks Exhibit held at the Cooper-Hewitt Museum in New York and International Museum of Photography at George Eastman House. On view at the Cooper Hewitt were more than 250 examples of prints, limited-edition books, graphics, animation, textiles, and 3-D pieces produced by artists and designers.

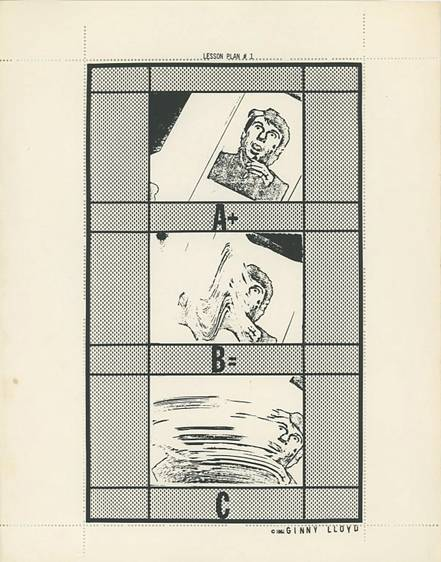
Sample of copy art manipulation by Ginny Lloyd

Galeria Motivation of Montreal, Canada, held an exhibit of copy art in 1981. PostMachina, an exhibit in Bologna, Italy, held in 1984, featured copy art works.

In May 1987, artist and curator George Muhleck wrote in Stuttgart about the international exhibition "Medium: Photocopie" that it inquired into "new artistic ways of handling photocopy." The book which accompanied the exhibition was sponsored mainly by the Goethe Institut of Montreal, with additional support from the Ministere des Affaires Culturelles du Quebec.

The complete collection I.S.C.A. Quarterlies is housed at the Jaffe Book Arts Collection of the Special Collections of the Wimberly Library at Florida Atlantic University in Boca Raton, Florida. The collection began in 1989 with several volumes donated by the Bienes Museum of the Modern Book, in Fort Lauderdale, FL. The Jaffe hosted an exhibition in 2010 of copy art by Ginny Lloyd, showcasing her works and copy art collection. She lectures and teaches workshops at the Jaffe on copy art history and techniques. She previously taught the workshop in 1981 at Academie Aki, Other Books and So Archive, and Jan Van Eyck Academie in The Netherlands; Image Resource Center in Cleveland and University of California - Berkeley.

In 2017–2018, the Whitney Museum of American Art in New York presented Experiments in Electrostatics: Photocopy Art from the Whitney’s Collection, 1966–1986, organized by curatorial fellow Michelle Donnelly.

== Current artwork ==
Copiers add to the arts, as can be seen by surrealist Jan Hathaway's combining color xerography with other media, Carol Heifetz Neiman's layering prismacolor pencil through successive runs of a color photocopy process (1988-1990), or R.L. Gibson's use of large scale xerography such as in Psychomachia (2010).

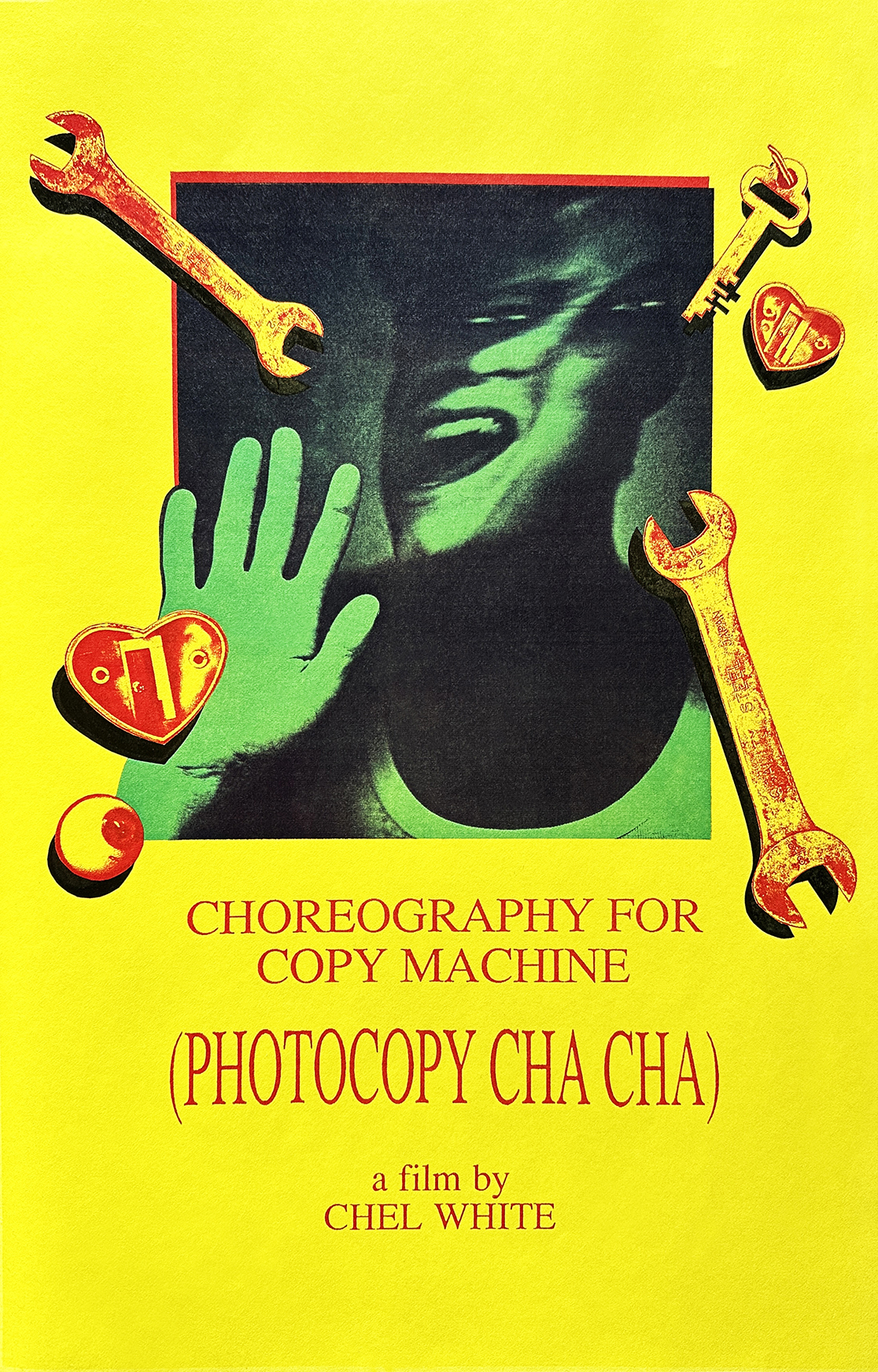
Theatrical poster for "Choreography for Copy Machine (Photocopy Cha Cha)".)

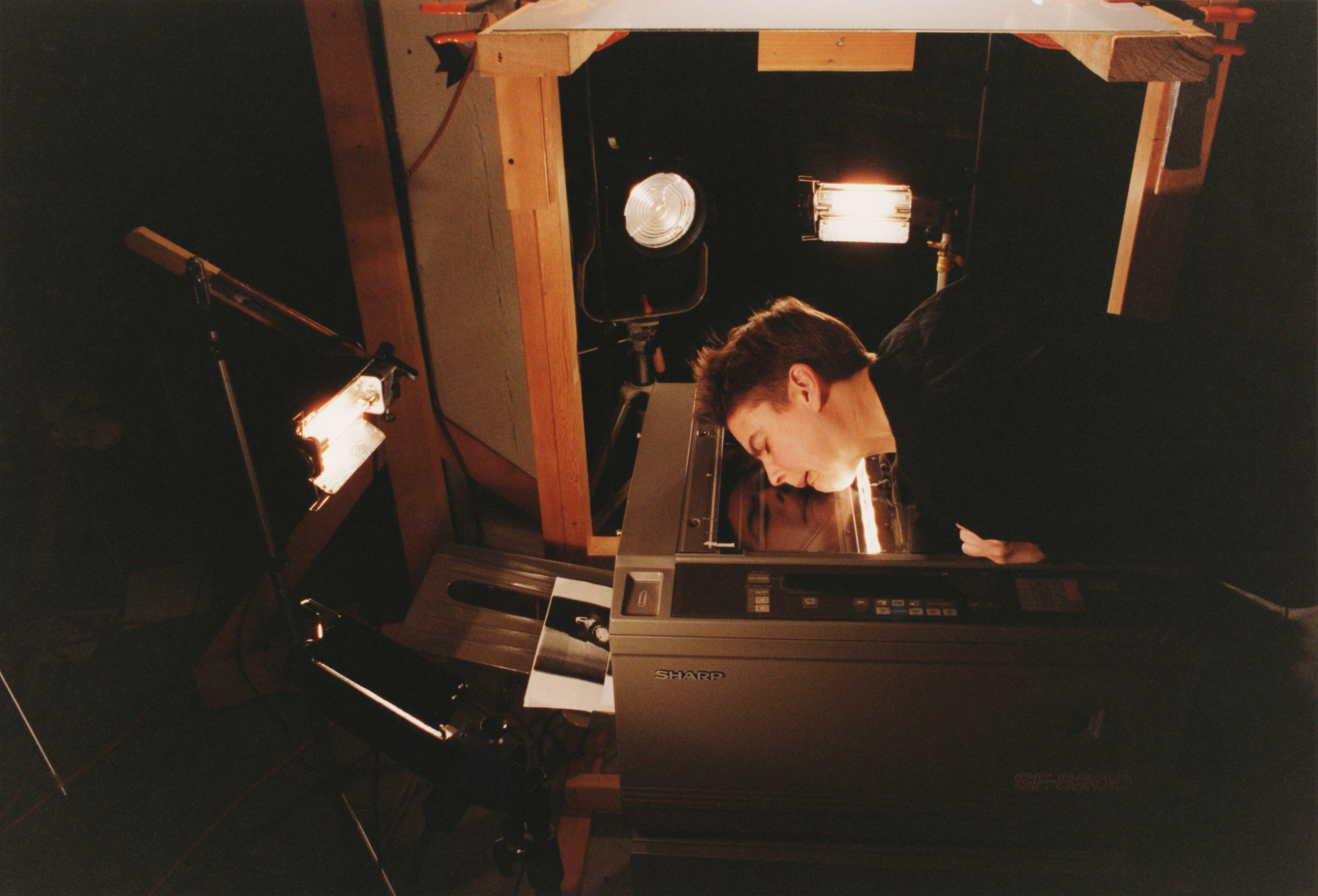
The set up Chel White created for his direct photocopy technique. In addition to four side lights (three of which are pictured), there is a top light positioned behind a sheet of frosted glass that allows for the silhouettes of people and objects to be visible.

In 1991, independent filmmaker Chel White completed a 4-minute animated film titled "Choreography for Copy Machine (Photocopy Cha Cha)". All of the film's images were created solely by using the unique photographic capabilities of a Sharp mono-colour photocopier to generate sequential pictures of hands, faces, and other body parts. Layered colors were created by shooting the animation through photographic gels. The film achieves a dream-like aesthetic with elements of the sensual and the absurd. The Berlin International Film Festival describes it as "a swinging essay about physiognomy in the age of photo-mechanical reproduction. The Austin Film Society dubs it, "Doubtlessly the best copy machine art with delightfully rhythmic sequences of images, all to a cha-cha-cha beat." The film screened in a special program at the 2001 Sundance Film Festival, and was awarded Best Animated Short Film at the 1992 Ann Arbor Film Festival.

Manufacturers of the machines are an obvious source of funding for artistic experimentation with copiers and such companies as Rank, Xerox, Canon and Selex have been willing to lend machines, sponsor shows and pay for artists-in-residence programs.

== See also ==
- Scanography
- Photocopier
