= Peter Turk =

Péter Türk
- Born: 6 May 1943; Pestszenterzsébet
- Died: 8 March 2015 (aged 71); Budapest

Péter Türk (6 May 1943 – 8 March 2015) Hungarian visual artist. In 1969, he became a member of the Szürenon group, then an important participant in the Hungarian neo-avantgarde scene. In 1970, he took part in the R-Exhibition, held at the University of Technology (Budapest), and was an exhibitor at György Galántai's Balatonboglár Chapel between 1970 and 1972. In 1976, he participated in the exhibition titled Exposition. Photo/Art (Hatvany Lajos Museum, Hatvan). His first significant solo show was held at Budapest Galéria Józsefvárosi Kiállítóterme in 1987, under the title Psychograms, Phenomena. He participated in many international group shows (e.g. Időhíd – Zeitbrücke, 2001, Museum Moderner Kunst, Passau, Germany; Tolerance in Art, 2009, Danubiana – Meulensteen Art Museum, Bratislava, Slovakia). His works can be found in the collections of Kunsthalle Praha (Praha), the Ludwig Museum - Museum of Contemporary Art (Budapest), and the Hungarian National Gallery (Budapest), among others.

== Biography ==
Péter Türk studied at the Grammar School for Fine and Applied Arts in Budapest between 1957 and 1961, then learned to be a typesetter at the Print Industry School between 1963 and 1964. From 1964 to 1968 he studied for a diploma in Hungarian and art at the Eger Teachers' Training College. He had his first exhibition in 1968, thence became an important participant in the Hungarian neo-avantgarde scene. In 1970, he met his future wife, Amália Bojta (Amy), their first child, Dóra was born in 1979, then their second child, Zsuzsanna was born in 1981. Between 1968 and 1971, Türk taught Hungarian and art at the Lakatos Street primary school in Pestlőrinc, then art and art history at the Print Industry School from 1971 to 1983. In 1983, an eye disease forced him to quit teaching, and because of this Türk took applied graphics commissions to sustain his family from 1984 to 1988. In 1989, as a result of his personal experience of God, he stopped making art for one and a half years, then presented new works in 1991 at Óbudai Társaskör Galéria, under the title BREAD, WATER. He became ill and got operated in 2009, then his illness recurred in 2011. He died in 2015.

== Works ==
Péter Türk's oeuvre is characterised by a multiplicity of media, an inclination for experimentation, and thinking in terms of structures and series. In his work, Türk employed uninterruptedly unusual and singular visual techniques. In his earliest works, he was engaged with geometric structures, these were followed by series of photographs in the 1970s (Class Average I-II, 1979; Crossing into the Line, Steel Wire, Branch of a Tree, through the Tip of a Knife, into the Point, 1976). Later, he developed unique visual techniques, for instance, the so-called “phenomena”, which comprise enlarging negatives on top of each other (e.g. Psychograms, Phenomena, 1976-1979-1986). In his montages and associational series, there is an emphasis on a filmic thinking, the momentum of construction-deconstruction, building on basic elements and forms, and their analytical examination (e.g. Enlargement through Repetition, 1975–77). From 1989, as a consequence of a kind of religious turn, sacrality as viewpoint also appeared in his works, and at this time, he examined various types of opposite-pairs, such as light-dark, depth-height, visible-invisible – from the perspective of faith (e.g. Under his shadow I delighted to sit, 1993–94). This new kind of thinking remained defining until the end of his life. In the 2000s, he also began to experiment with computer programs, and the scientific curiosity that has accompanied his work from the outset until the end again became more marked at this time. His retrospective exhibition was held at the Ludwig Museum - Museum of Contemporary Art (Budapest), under the title All Is Not Visible in 2018.

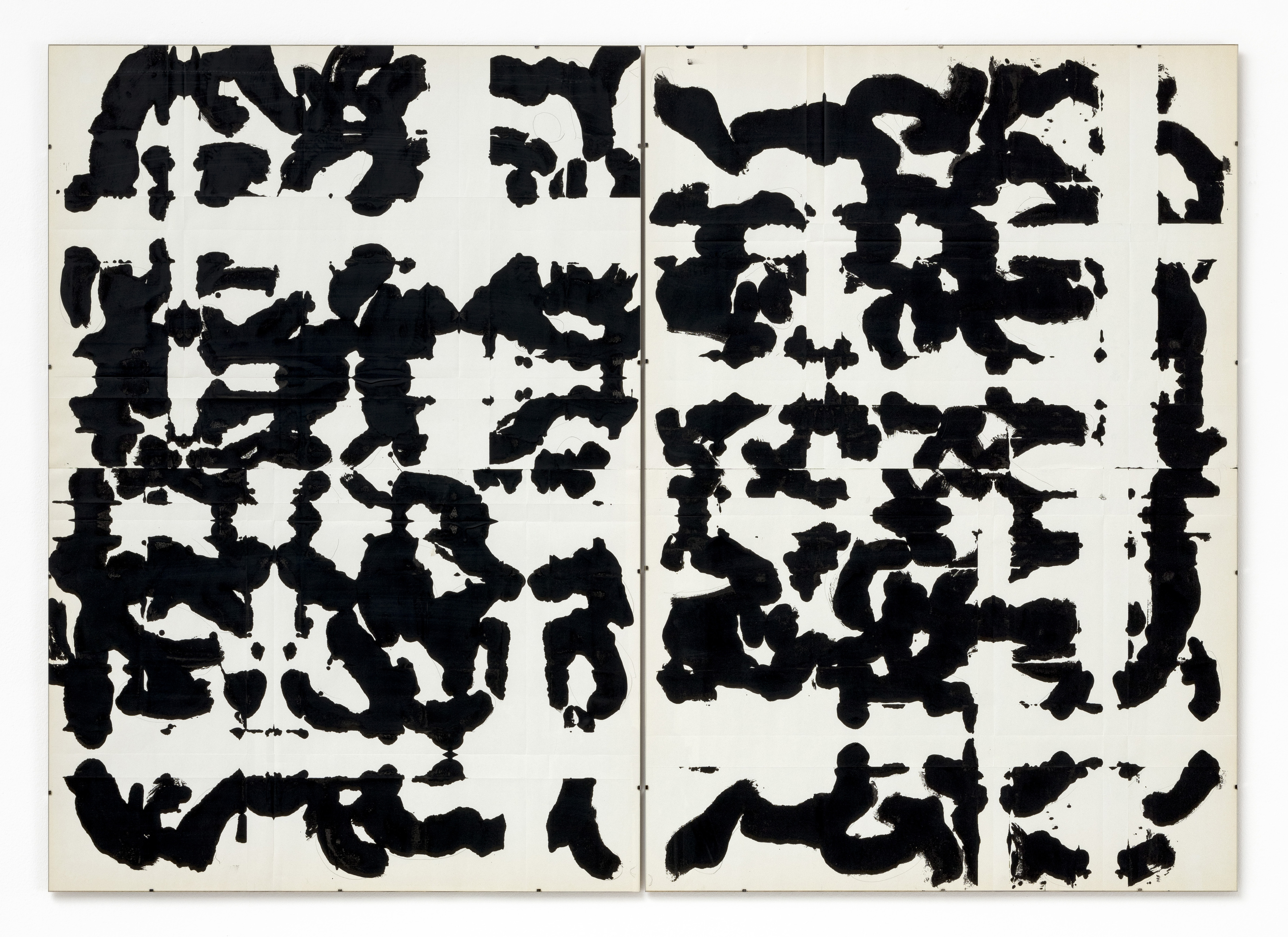
Péter Türk: Under his shadow I delighted to sit I-II, 1993–1994. Enamel on paper, 100x70 cm each.

== Prizes ==
- Munkácsy Prize (2005)
- Klára Herczeg Prize (2005)
- Artist of Merit (2010)

== Solo exhibitions ==
- 1968 Dormitory of the teachers' training college, Eger
- 1974 Egyetemi Színpad, Budapest
- 1987 Psychograms, Phenomena. Józsefváros Exhibition Hall of Budapest Gallery, Budapest
- 1987 Fészek Klub, Herman terem, Budapest
- 1991 BREAD, WATER. Óbudai Társaskör Galéria, Budapest
- 1996 Under his Shadow I Delighted to Sit. Budapest History Museum ‒ Kiscell Museum / Municipal Picture Gallery, Budapest
- 1999 Flowers of Thirst. Óbudai Pincegaléria, Budapest
- 2000 BREAD, WATER. Franciscan Monastery, Szeged
- 2001 Ábrázolás, ábrázolódás. Pintér Sonja Galéria, Budapest
- 2002 Emerging Images. Center for Culture & Communication, Budapest
- 2003 Cumulative Drawing and Projection of Football Scenes. Benedictine School of Pannonhalma, Tetőtér Galéria, Pannonhalma
- 2006 Length, Width, Height and Depth. Budapest History Museum ‒ Kiscell Museum / Municipal Picture Gallery, Budapest
- 2013 Seventeen Meters of Images among Trees and Leaves. Óbudai Társaskör Galéria, Budapest
- 2018 All Is Not Visible. Ludwig Museum ‒ Museum of Contemporary Art, Budapest
- 2019 Views of Change and Permanence. Vintage Galéria, Budapest

== Works in public collections ==
- Artpool Art Research Center ‒ Museum of Fine Arts, Budapest
- Budapest History Museum, Museum Kiscell ‒ Municipal Picture Gallery, Budapest
- Hungarian Látványtár Art Foundation & Collection, Tapolca-Diszel
- Kunsthalle Praha, Praha
- National Film Institute and Film Archive, Budapest
- Hungarian National Gallery - Museum of Fine Arts, Budapest
- Art Gallery Paks, Paks
- Sárospatak Art Gallery, Sárospatak
- King St. Stephen Museum, Székesfehérvár
