= Pati Hill =

American writer and photocopy artist

- Born: Patricia Louise Guion Hill; April 3, 1921; Ashland, Kentucky, U.S.
- Died: September 19, 2014 (aged 93); Sens, France
- Known for: Copy art, writing, modeling

Pati Hill (April 3, 1921 - September 19, 2014) was an American writer and photocopy artist known for her observational style of prose and her work with the IBM photocopier. While she was not the first artist to experiment with the copier, her work is distinguished by its focus on objects, her emphasis on the accessibility of the medium, and her efforts to unite image and text so that they may "fuse to become something other than either."

== Personal life ==
Hill was born Patricia Louise Guion Hill in Ashland, Kentucky in 1921. She moved to Charlottesville, Virginia with her mother at age eight. In her late teens, Hill attended George Washington University before moving to New York. Throughout her life, she moved between France and the United States before finally settling in Sens, Yonne, France in the 1990s. Beginning in 1956, she lived for several decades in Stonington, Connecticut.

For several years in the late 1980s, Hill owned an antiques shop in Mystic, Connecticut.

On the subject of marriage, Hill was recorded saying, "it was invented by the Devil—in the guise of a man." She was married three times throughout her life. Her first marriage lasted approximately nine months. In the 1940s, Hill married her second husband, Robert Meservey, a skier for the Dartmouth Ski Team, in what was called "a wedding-on-skis." Hill and Meservey skied to the church while Hill carried a bouquet of evergreen branches. Hill's marriage to Meservey was featured in a photo spread in LIFE.

In 1960 after her two previous marriages, Hill married French gallerist Paul Bianchini, known for bringing attention to postwar artists such as Andy Warhol, Roy Lichtenstein, and Claes Oldenburg. In 1962, Hill gave birth to a daughter, Paola.

Hill was widowed in 2000 when Bianchini died of cancer.

Hill died in her home in Sens, France on September 19, 2014.

== Modeling career ==
At age 19, Hill moved to New York where she worked as a model for the John Robert Powers Agency. In the late 1940s, Hill moved to Paris to continue her modeling career, becoming "a top-flight model" for Edward Molyneux and other designers. There, she modeled what she recalled was "the first collection of American clothes" in Paris.

During the 1940s and 1950s, Hill was featured on the covers or in the layouts of magazines such as Harper's Bazaar, LIFE, and Elle. She modeled throughout her twenties and occasionally modeled for photographer and close friend Diane Arbus before withdrawing from fashion to retire to the French countryside.

== Writing career ==
While living in a small house in France, Hill wrote a memoir, The Pit and the Century Plant, and her first novel, The Nine Mile Circle.

The Pit and the Century Plant, an account of her experience in the French countryside, was praised for its evocative reflections and "vivid appreciation" of life among the French people. In this memoir, Hill recounts her experiences with "the hardships of country living," forming a relationship with her neighbor across the road, and her dealings with nature.

The Nine Mile Circle received both positive and mixed reviews, celebrated for its "charming style" but criticized for its familiar content. One reviewer for the St. Louis Post-Dispatch praised The Nine Mile Circle for its intimate look into the lives of its characters, saying, "You finish The Nine Mile Circle feeling almost guilty at having witnessed so much that is private and personal in the lives of these people" and further calling her style "fresh and intriguing" while offering a swift criticism of the novel's lack of form. Several reviewers favorably compared Hill to William Faulkner for her depth of insight into her characters. Harper's Bazaar published an excerpt of The Nine Mile Circle entitled "Jetty's Black Rage" in their April 1956 issue.

While modeling in New York in the 1940s, Hill began writing for Mademoiselle and Seventeen. In Paris, Hill contributed six short stories and an essay entitled "Cats" to The Paris Review in addition to an interview with Truman Capote. Her final contribution was published in the Spring of 1981.

Through the early 1970s, Hill was granted and attended multiple residencies at the MacDowell Colony and Yaddo to work on her writing.

== Copy art ==
In 1962, Hill began collecting informational art and objects as a housekeeper, which would become the subjects of her earliest works on the photocopier. She cited two experiences as her inspiration for experimenting with the photocopier. In one of her accounts, Hill accidentally copied her thumb while attempting to copy documents and was introduced to the potential of the copier. In another explanation, she maintained that she was cleaning out a drawer when she decided that she wanted to remember some of its contents. Following this account, Hill realized "she could more easily part with some of the objects she'd been collecting if she photocopied them as mementos."

Hill possessed "a longtime curiosity about the details of objects.", respect she developed during the Great Depression, when, she recalled, "anything anybody had was it because there wasn't going to be another." Hill began to experiment with the photocopier in 1973 by asking an attendant at a copy shop to scan various items for her. Later, she spent a weekend locked in IBM's New York offices to produce copies. About this, she said, "I got a lot of copies made and walked out on Monday morning when everyone came in."

In 1975, Hill published Slave Days, a book of 29 poems paired with photocopies of small household objects.

In 1976, Hill published another novel, Impossible Dreams, illustrated by photocopies of 48 photographs taken by photographers such as Robert Doisneau and Ralph Gibson. Impossible Dreams is the product of Hill's efforts to create what she called a "stopped movie." Hill's style of prose in this novel prompted one reviewer to call her writing "honest as kitchen knives but wielded in some dark alley." Impossible Dreams earned Hill a fellowship from the National Endowment for the Arts in 1976. Hill also used the photocopier to appropriate photographs in her work Men and Women in Sleeping Cars, a visual narrative sequence, in 1979. In 1977 on a flight from Paris to New York, Hill encountered designer Charles Eames and showed him some of the work she made on the copier. He formally introduced her to IBM, who presented Hill with an IBM Copier II on loan for two and a half years. With the copier installed in her home in Stonington, Connecticut, Hill experimented with techniques such as moving an object over the platen of the copier as a copy was being made, occasionally using brightly colored copier paper, and spooning extra quantities of toner into the machine. The IBM Copier II created many of the features which distinguished Hill's work by allowing for richer blacks and producing "flaws" in the print where the toner did not adhere to the paper. Hill embraced these flaws, stating, "The production of accidents is perhaps the feature of the copier which most endears it to the artist."

Hill did not view her prints as representations nor reproductions of physical objects, but she instead considered her prints as objects in and of themselves. On photocopies, Hill said, "A photocopy seems to me much more truthful to detail than a photograph." She never enlarged nor shrank the scale of the objects she copied. Hill's work with the photocopier led her to treat the process of photocopying as a conversation with the photocopier. She presented the machine with a degree of autonomy, explaining,

This stocky, unrevealing box stands 3 ft. high without stockings or feet and lights up like a Xmas tree no matter what I show it. It repeats my words perfectly as many times as I ask it to, but when I show it a hair curler it hands me back a space ship, and when I show it the inside of a straw hat it describes the eerie joys of a descent into a volcano.

spaceshipHill also used the copier to negotiate the relationship between words and images. She strove to create "work in which the two elements fuse to become something other than either." This effort is evident in A Swan: An Opera in Nine Chapters which creates a story through the combination of text and a series of photocopied prints of a dead swan. Her fascination with words and images further contributed to her efforts to create a universal symbol language, which was taught briefly to first-grade students of Deans Mill School in Stonington, Connecticut in the 1970s. In 1979, Hill published Letters to Jill: A catalogue and some notes on copying, which acts as a "jargon-free primer" on the photocopier as an artist's tool.

For a profile in The New Yorker in 1980, Hill described her intimate relationship with and understanding of photocopies, explaining, "Copies are an international visual language, which talks to people in Los Angeles and people in Prague the same way. Making copies is very near to speaking."

In the 1980s, Hill committed to one of her greatest ambitions: photocopying the Palace of Versailles. She cited four reasons for this venture: 1) she considered Versailles to be simultaneously "self-centered" and "public-spirited"; 2) it shared connections between the United States and France, and she considered herself to be a citizen of both countries; 3) she wanted to "do something big"; 4) she wanted to see what "a modern device would make of something old." Additionally, she explained, "I conceived the idea of photocopying the château of Versailles because, among other reasons, it is so well known through painting and photography. It gives me a dramatic opportunity to show the difference between those disciplines and that of copying. The great variety of subject matter would allow full range to the copier's artistic capacity within a single framework." She copied a bellpull, cobblestones, and a pear tree, roots and live worms included, all of which were pulled from Versailles. Her work with Versailles further introduced her experimentation with colored toner, frottage, and photogravure. Hill intended to have several exhibitions of her Versailles work, including shows titled Weeds, Worms, Water and Popsicle Sticks, Stone and Iron, Walls and Words, and Lace and Glass. Nevertheless, Hill insisted, "I am not interested in Copy Art per se but rather in what I can do with a copier."

In 1989, Hill and her husband, Bianchini, opened Galerie Toner, a gallery dedicated to exhibiting art made with the photocopier, in Sens, France. Hill and Bianchini opened a second Galerie Toner in Paris in 1992.

== Publications ==
=== Memoirs ===
- The Pit and the Century Plant (New York: Harper, 1955)

=== Novels ===
- The Nine Mile Circle (New York: Houghton Mifflin, 1957)
- Prosper (New York: Houghton Mifflin, 1960)
- One Thing I Know (New York: Houghton Mifflin, 1962)
- Impossible Dreams (Cambridge: Alice James Books, 1976) Illustrated with Hill's photocopies of photographs by Robert Doisneau, Ralph Gibson, Eva Rubinstein, and Willi Ronis.

=== Poetry ===
- The Snow Rabbit (New York: Houghton Mifflin, 1962) Illustrated by Galway Kinnell.
- Slave Days (New York: Kornblee, 1975) Illustrated with photocopies by Hill.

=== Artist's books ===
- Italian Darns (New York: Kornblee, 1978)
- Rose Marilyn (Sens, France: Cinq Rue Jules Verne, 1993)
- Leaving the Pear (Paris: Bianchini-Toner, 1994–1995)
- Windows (Sens, France: Bianchini-Toner, 1995)
- Boating Notes (limited edition, handmade, 1996)
- Women and Vacuum Cleaners (limited edition, handmade, 1996)
- Men and Bombs (limited edition, handmade, 1996)
- The Leaf Book (limited edition, handmade, 1997)
- '3 Stories' (Top Stories #3, 1979)

=== Books on art ===
- Letters to Jill: A catalogue and some notes on copying (New York: Kornblee, 1979)

== Notable works ==
- Photocopied Garments, 1976. Photocopies of various articles of clothing.
- A Swan: An Opera in Nine Chapters, 1978. Photocopies of a dead swan paired with brief writings.

== Notable exhibitions ==
=== Solo ===
- 1975: Objets. Kornblee Gallery, New York; Centre Culturel de Flaine.
- 1976: Concrete Poems. Centre Culturel de Flaine.
- 1976: Garments. Kornblee Gallery, New York.
- 1977: Dreams Objects Moments. Kornblee Gallery, New York.
- 1978: Common Alphabet 1. Franklin Furnace, New York.
- 1978: A Swan, An Opera in 9 Chapters. Kornblee Gallery, New York.
- 1979: Men and Women in Sleeping Cars. Kornblee Gallery, New York.
- 1982: Italian Darns. Galerie Modema, Bologne.
- 1983: Scarves. Galerie Texbraun, Paris.
- 1992: Excerpts from Versailles Eye to Eye and Rose Marilyn. SAGA Grand Palais, Paris.
- 1993: Excerpts from Versailles Eye to Eye. Premiere Vision, Paris.
- 1998: Cabinet des Estampes, Bibliothèque Nationale de France, Paris.
- 2000: Wall Papers. Bayly Art Museum, University of Virginia, Charlottesville.
- 2016: Pati Hill: Photocopier. Arcadia University Art Gallery, Glenside, Pennsylvania.
- 2017: Pati Hill: Photocopier, A Survey of Prints and Books (1974-83). Lyman Allyn Art Museum, New London, Connecticut.

=== Group ===
- 1976, 1977: Dialogue. UNESCO, Paris.
- 1979: Electroworks. George Eastman House, New York.
- 1980: L'Electrographie. Musée d'Art Moderne de la Ville de Paris.
- 1984: Electra. Musée d'Art Moderne de la Ville de Paris.
- 1984: New Media 2. Konsthall, Malmö, Sweden.
- 1985: Electroworks. Stedelijk Museum, Amsterdam.
- 1993: Le Dernier Souper. Paul Bianchini Galeria Toner, Paris.
- 1994: La Disparition De L'Alphabet. Paul Bianchini Galeria Toner, Paris.
- 1994: Artist's Books Created on Copiers. Paul Bianchini Galerie Toner, Paris.

== Collections ==
- Arcadia Exhibitions, Arcadia University, Glenside, Pennsylvania
- The Whitney Museum of American Art, New York City, New York
- Bayly Art Museum, University of Virginia, Charlottesville, Virginia
- Cabinet des Estampes, Bibliothèque Nationale de France, Paris, France
- Cooper-Hewitt National Design Museum, Smithsonian Institution, New York City, New York
- Fiduciaire de France KPMG, Grenoble, France
- Musée de Sens, Sens-en-Bourgogne, France
- Xerox-USA, Stamford, Connecticut
- Princeton University Art Museum, Princeton, NJ
