= György Galántai =

Hungarian neo-avant-garde and fluxus artist

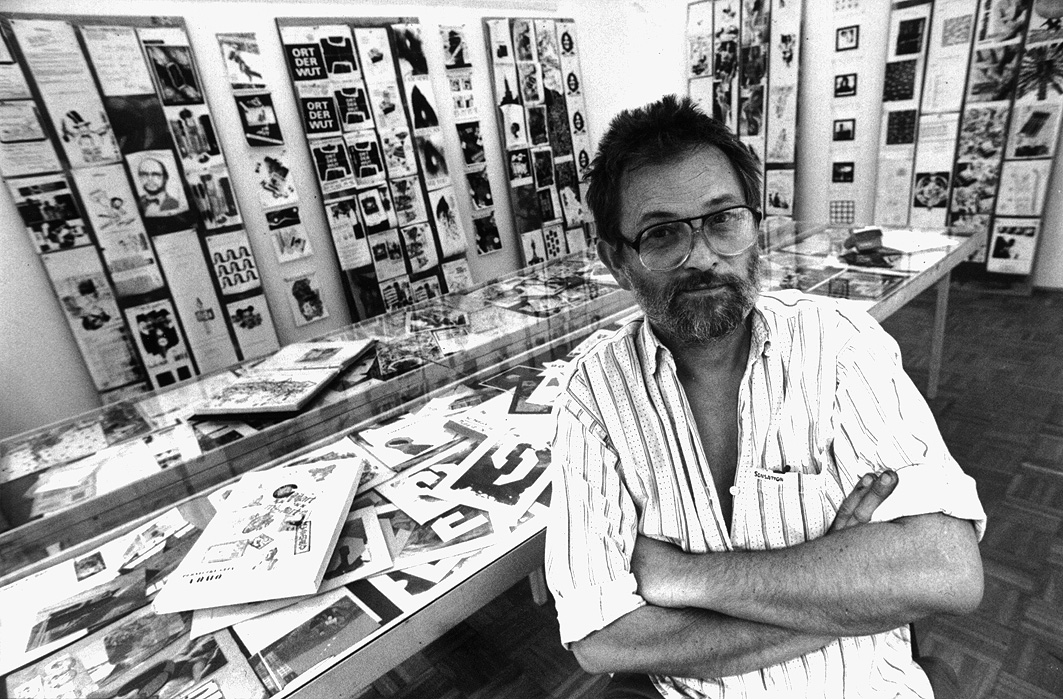
- György Galántai with the exhibition organized from the material of Budapest Session of the 1992 Decentralized World Wide Networker Congress and Artpool's first fax action in the background.
- Born: June 17, 1941 (age 83); Bikács, Hungary
- Website: http://www.galantai.hu/

György Galántai (born June 17, 1941) is a Hungarian neo-avant-garde and fluxus artist, organizer of the events of the Chapel Studio in Balatonboglár which run from 1970 to 1973 and founder of the Artpool Art Research Center Budapest. During the Communist Era of Hungary, he organized illegal, underground avant-garde exhibitions and therefore he was considered to be a "dangerous element" by the Party for spreading western propaganda, and was monitored by secret police, who opened the file "Painter" solely documenting his activity. From the late seventies he started an intense correspondence with fellow artists all over the world, joining into the network of mail art despite the Iron Curtain limiting his access for information. In 1979 he created an archive for these correspondences and other documents which he collected on Hungarian neo-avantgarde movements and initiated Artpool which became the largest archive of new mediums such as fluxus, visual poetry, artists' book, mail art, artistamp etc. in Central Europe.

Between 1970 and 1973, Galántai organized and ran the "Chapel Studio" of avant-garde art held all summer in the chapel in Balatonboglár. In all, there were some 35 exhibitions, concerts, poetry recitals, theatrical performances, and film showings were held over these four years, featuring the best of Hungary's (and then considered politically undesirable) avant-garde artists, and guest artists from abroad.
