= Gezelle =

Gezelle is a given name and surname. Notable people with the name include:

== Given name ==
- Gezelle Magerman (born 1997), South African hurdler

== Surname ==
- Guido Gezelle (1830–1899), Belgian writer and priest
- Gérard De Gezelle (1903–1978), Belgian rower
