= Artistamp =

Postage stamp-like art form

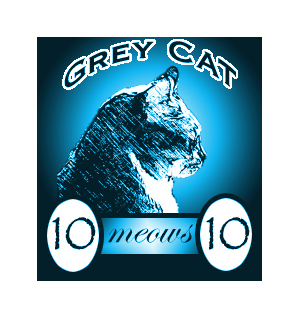
Artistamp by Elaine with Grey Cats, 2005

An artistamp (a portmanteau of the words "artist" and "stamp") or artist's stamp is a postage stamp-like art form used to depict or commemorate any subject its creator chooses. Artistamps are a form of Cinderella stamps in that they are not valid for postage, but they differ from forgeries or bogus Illegal stamps in that typically the creator has no intent to defraud postal authorities or stamp collectors.

Artistamp creators often include their work on legitimate mail, alongside valid postage stamps, in order to decorate the envelope with their art. In many countries this practice is legal, provided the artistamp is not passed off as or likely to be mistaken for a genuine postage stamp. When so combined (and sometimes, less strictly speaking, even when not so) the artistamp may be considered part of the mail art genre.

Irony, satire, humor, eroticism and subversion of governmental authority are frequent characteristics of artistamps. Artists may leverage the expectation of official endorsement that necessarily inheres in governmentally-issued postage for the purpose of shocking or subverting viewers' expectations, with such actions typically representing a specific political and artistic motive. Other practitioners are content to depict more homey subjects like kittens and family members. Some artists use the form to create fantasy stamps for their own postal administrations or countries – in many cases thereby developing or complementing an imaginary governmental system.

== History ==
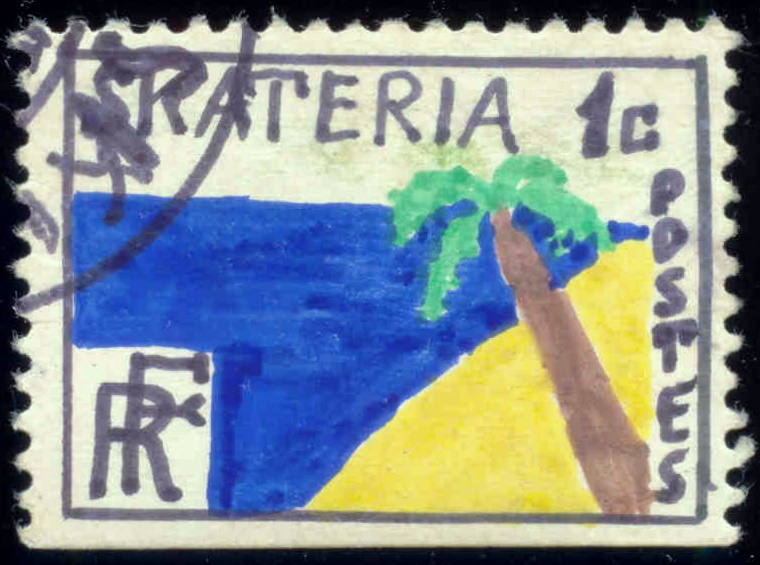
Artistamp by Leonid Dzhepko, c. 1971

The first artist to produce an "artist’s stamp" is open to interpretation. It did not take many years after the introduction of postage stamps before UK commercial photographers saw a market in personalised stamp photographs incorporating an individual's portrait within a stamp-like printed border, printed in perforated sheets with gummed backs. Fine artists were certainly commissioned to create poster stamps (advertising posters in collectible stamp form) from the late 1800s, but none appear to have worked with the format outside the commercial or advertising context.

In 1919, Dadaist Raoul Hausmann affixed a self-portrait postage stamp to a postcard, but given that Dada was determinedly anti-art (at least in theory), calling this an "artist’s stamp" seems almost counterintuitive.

German artist Karl Schwesig, while a political prisoner during World War II, drew a series of pseudo-stamps on the blank, perforated margins of postage stamp sheets, using coloured inks. Jas Felter asserts that this 1941 series, which illustrated life in a concentration camp, is typically accepted as the first true set of artist's stamps.

American Robert Watts, a member of the Fluxus group, became the first artist to create a full sheet of [faux] postage stamps within a fine art context when he produced a perforated block of 15 stamps combining popular and erotic imagery in 1961.

Canadian multimedia artist and philatelist T Michael Bidner, who made his life's work the cataloguing of all then-known artist's stamps, coined the word "artistamp" in 1982. It quickly became the term of choice amongst mail artists.

Artist Clifford Harper published a series of designs for anarchist postage stamps in 1988, featuring portraits of Percy Bysshe Shelley, Emma Goldman, Oscar Wilde, Emiliano Zapata and Herbert Read.

== Recognition of the art form ==
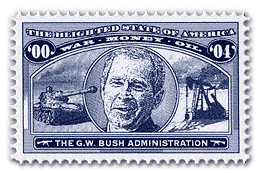
The Blighted State of America by Twine Workshop (2005)

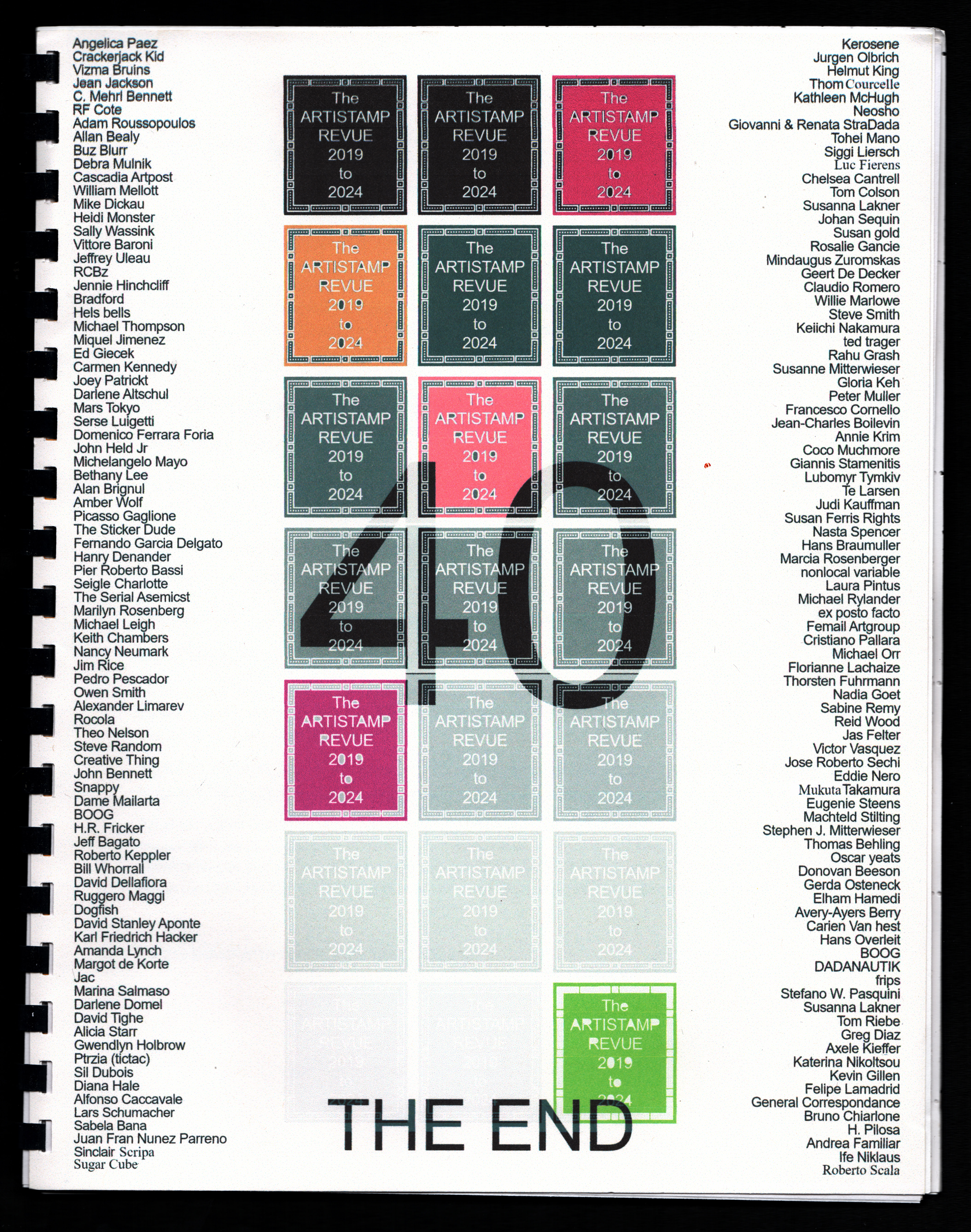
Adam Roussopoulos project for new artistamps (2019-2024)

Despite the exhibitions, history, number of artists and global sweep of the artistamp movement, the medium had long been ignored by major institutions and derided by the arts establishment: before his death in 1989, Bidner attempted to donate his definitive collection to several major Canadian institutions but was turned down by every one. The collection eventually went to Artpool, an art research centre in Budapest, Hungary, who organized World Art Post, the first big scale artistamp exhibition in Central Europe in 1982, and in 1987 the first arstistamp exhibition to be held in a renowned museum. Upon his death, Bidner's friend Rosemary Gahlinger-Beaune, undertook Bidner's vision and began to catalogue, using philatelic standards, artistamps from over 200 artists from 29 countries, documenting more than 10,000 artistamp images. In 1999, Gahlinger-Beaune and Bianchini released a CD entitled "The World of Artistamps", the most comprehensive database of artistamps of the time.

Multimedia artist James Warren "Jas" Felter curated an exhibition called Artists' Stamps and Stamp Images at Simon Fraser Gallery, Simon Fraser University, Canada, in 1974: the first exhibition to acknowledge the stamp as an artistic medium. This collection, which toured Europe and America for the next ten years, led to an explosion in the number of artists using stamps as an artistic format.

Photographer and multimedia artist Ginny Lloyd started her Gina Lotta Post series in 1979 and by 1982 had produced some of the first computer-generated imagery used in artists stamps. On a visit to Artpool in 1982, she collaborated with György Galántai on artistamp issues. In 1984, Lloyd co-organized an Art in Space event in San Francisco at which a rocket containing artistamps on a microchip was launched. In 1986, the artist received a Visual Studies Workshop artist-in-residence funded in part by the National Endowment for the Arts in the United States. Her project for the residency culminated with Gina Lotta Post, a series of artistamps bound into a book and includes a set of postcards. A second book Make Your Own Stamps Sheet, is a Complete and Return project that originated from the same residency, becoming available in 2011.

In 1989, Felter curated the first of three International Biannual Exhibitions of Artistamps at Davidson Galleries in Seattle.

In 1994, an exhibition sponsored by the Swiss Posts was held in the PTT-Museum in Berne, resulting in the publication of a book and four sheets of artists' stamps (one of the few printed at the costs of an official postal service!). More than 60 artists participated. The word "Artistamps" does not appear in the book, but on one of the stamps, by E.F. Higgins.

In 1995, Patricia Tavenner curated The First California Artistamp Exhibit at University of California, Berkeley - San Francisco Extension. The exhibit presented works of about 170 artists from around the world.

The First Moscow International Artistamp Exhibition was held in Moscow in December 1998, as part of International Art Fair XX. The event was curated by Natalie Lamanova, Alexander Kholopv and Jas Felter. This event gave rise to the "Moscow Artistamp Collection" which presently includes more than 700 works of 83 artists from 19 countries.

From November 12, 1999, to January 19, 2000, The Art Institute of Boston hosted the Stamp Art and Artists Stamps exhibition. The show included artistamp sheets from Natalia Lamanova, Alexander Kholopov of Russia, Vittore Baroni, Clemente Padin, Jose Carlos Soto, Pere Sousa and Donald Evans. PBS documented this exhibit.

February - March 2000: Moscow artists Ivan Kolesnikov and Sergei Denisov presented a joint Artistamp project entitled Azbuka Veka (The Alphabet of the Century) at the S’ART Gallery in Moscow. The show presented stamps of famous people tagged with letters from the Russian alphabet.

In December 2000, an exhibit featuring artistamps from around the world was displayed at the E. Max von Isser Gallery of Art at Elgin Community College, Elgin, Illinois.

The exhibition Motherland/Fatherland was held at The International Museum Exhibition Centre in Moscow from July 11 to 21, 2002. The event was curated by Natalie Lamanova, Alexander Kholopv and Jas Felter. Presented there were works by 44 artists from Russia, Canada, Germany, New Zealand, Spain, Korea, Italy, Japan, The Netherlands, Venezuela, Armenia and the United States.

The Sonoma County Museum in Santa Rosa, California, hosted the exhibit Post Modern Post: International Artistamps in April 2003. The show including the work of 50 artists from 15 countries.

In 2005, The exhibition Axis of Evil opened at The Nexus Gallery, Philadelphia in March 2005, and later traveled to Chicago and Green Bay, Wisconsin. Curated by Chicago-based artist Michael Hernandez de Luna, the exhibit featured 127 works by 47 stamp artists from 11 countries. It originated with the publication of the book Axis of Evil: Perforated Praeter Naturam, published by Qualiatica Press.

In the spring of 2007, the Budapest Museum of Fine Arts hosted a successful exhibition entitled ParaStamp: Four Decades of Artistamps, from Fluxus to the Internet. Curated by György Galántai, the exhibition presented approximately 500 works selected from the archive of the Artpool Art Research Center. More than 250 of the most important artists working in the artistamp genre were represented, including Natalie Lamanova, Anna Banana, Ed Varney, Guy Bleus, Twine Workshop, Michael Hernandez de Luna, Steve Smith, Vittore Baroni, Robert Watts, H.R. Fricker, Ryosuke Cohen, Ginny Lloyd, and Al Brandtner. "The new function artistamp has in this exhibition is to convey the explosively changing worldview at the turn of the millennium," said Galántai in an interview. The show ran from March 23 to June 24, 2007.

In July 2007, the SomArts Cultural Center gallery presented the Multiplicity/Multiplicidad: Mailart & Artistamp Show, in collaboration with Vortice Argentina, Buenos Aires.

The New Museum Weserburg in Bermen, Germany, held the exhibition Leck mich! - Künstlerbriefmarken seit den 1960er Jahren (Lick me! - Artist’s Stamps since the Sixties) from July 7, 2007, through February 2, 2008, assembling more than 300 works to present a global ensemble of stamp art. A portion of the exhibition description reads:

The fact that the artist’s stamp sets its own stamp on an (art) letter is one of the special features of this form of expression. A further facet of this small-format art is its challenging the mail monopoly by laying claim to the perforated and gummed miniature works of art. The stamps the artists create are not meant to swindle the postal service, but to call into question the right to design things. The focus in the exhibition will therefore be the artist’s stamp as an expression of independence and self-determination. Thus the title, Lick me!, is not only an invitation to “remain glued” to this exhibition, rather it also exemplifies the stance of a self-confident genre.

Turner Prize-winning artist and Academy Award-winning filmmaker Steve McQueen assembled the Queen and Country exhibition comprising stamps depicting British servicemen and women killed in Iraq. The exhibition was hosted at the Scottish National Gallery of Modern Art in Edinburgh between December 3, 2008, and February 15, 2009.

David Krueger's series of pseudo-stamps critiquing the Bush administration, begun in 2001, was on view at the CUE Art Foundation in Chelsea, Manhattan, New York, from April 24 - May 31, 2008.

The JAY Gallery in Seoul, Korea, sponsored the exhibition, American Artistamps, curated by John Held, Jr., from May 19 - June 1, 2010. It featured works by Robert Watts, Donald Evans, Harley, Dogfish, Picasso Gaglione, Michael Thompson, Al Ackerman, Darlene Altschul, Mike Dickau and John Ringer.

The Gina Lotta Post Artistamp Museum, curated by Ginny Lloyd, opened in May 2010. Currently located in Jupiter, Florida, the museum collection began in the late 1970s and exhibits over 4,200 works by more than 200 international artistamp creators. Selections from the museum can be seen online. Items from the museum were on exhibit at the Jaffe Center for the Book Arts in Boca Raton, Florida, from July 15 to October 27, 2010. Artists stamps by Harley, Jurgen Olbrich, Reed Altemus, Rockola, Picasso Gaglione, Buz Blurr, Vitore Baroni, and Ginny Lloyd were featured as part of the "Carbon Alternative" exhibit.

In November 2012, The Museum of Artistamps opened in Seattle. The museum is curated by Robert Rudine (Dogfish), working in collaboration with James Felter.

On November 10, 2012, the exhibition, AARPEX (the Artistamp Reunion and Philatelic Expo), was held in Seattle. AARPEX was organized by Carl Chew and Robert Rudine.

Artistamps have been recognized in mainstream stamp publications, such as Linn's Stamp News. In 2004, Linn's published an article covering the release of Twine Workshop's "The Blighted State of America" artistamp, a piece directly criticizing then U.S. president George W. Bush.

John Held Jr.'s book, Small Scale Subversion: Mail Art & Artistamps, was published on April 11, 2015.

From 2019-2024, mail artist Adam Roussopoulos has compiled contemporary artistampers from all over the world in his publication - The Artistamp Review. The review included some of the prominent works by artists like John Held Jr., The Sticker Dude (Joel Cohen), Vittore Baroni, Ruggero Maggi, the late E.F. Higgins III and H.R. Fricker to name a few. The project expanded to 40 issues.

== Controversy ==
In 2005, United States Secret Service agents attended the opening of the Axis of Evil exhibition at Columbia College Chicago's Glass Curtain Gallery. According to Carol Ann Brown, director of the gallery, the agents were most interested in the work entitled "Patriot Act" by Chicago-based artist Al Brandtner. The work depicts a revolver pointed at the head of then President George W. Bush. Secret Service spokesman Tom Mazur stated, "We need to ensure ... that this is nothing more than artwork with a political statement."

When the exhibit opened at a gallery on the University of Wisconsin-Green Bay campus on September 15, 2005, university chancellor Bruce Shepard directed the removal of Brandtner's work from the gallery. In a letter to faculty and staff, Shepard said "in a society all too violence prone, using these or other venues to appear to advocate or suggest assassination is not something the UW-Green Bay may do."

== The artistamp creation process ==
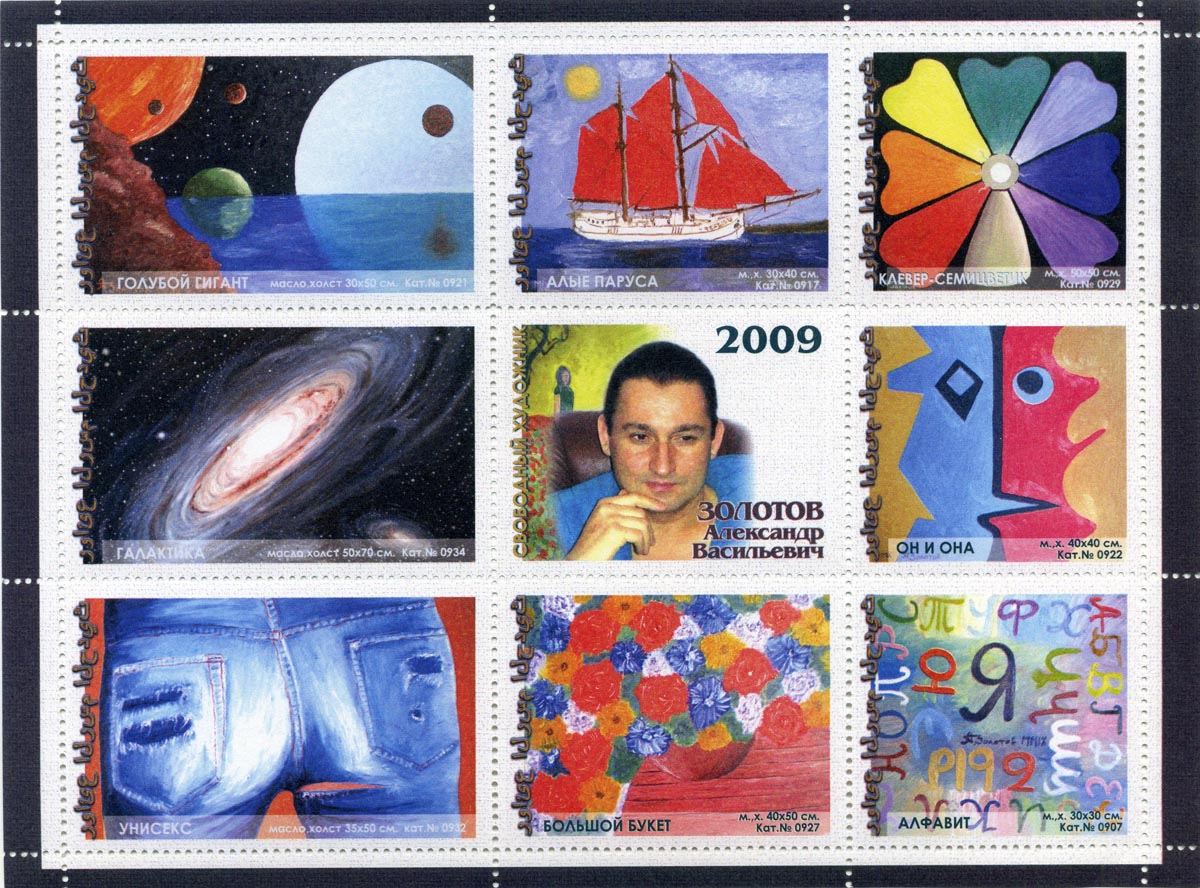
"Stamp Mint Sheet" by Aleksandr Zolotov, 2009

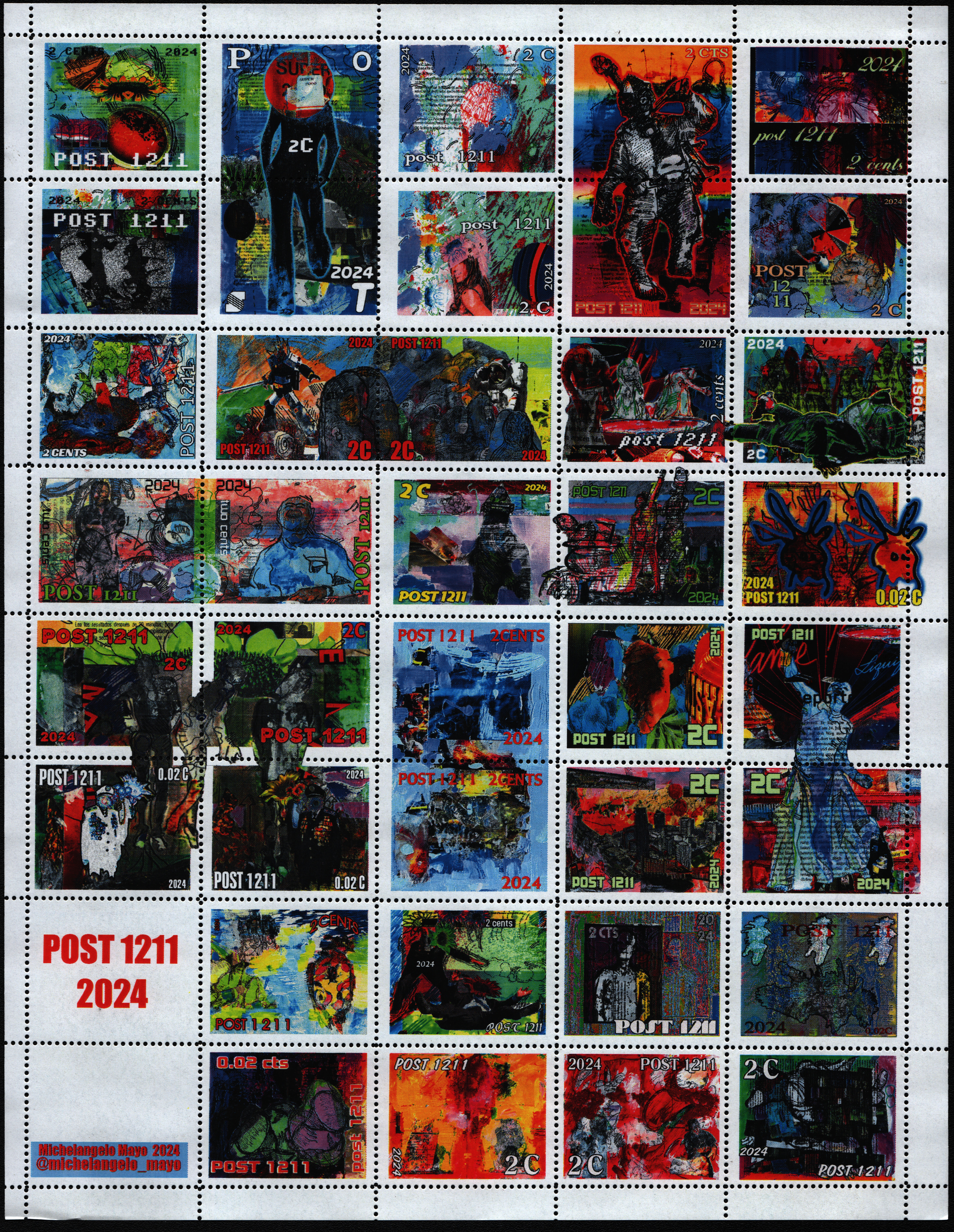
"Artistamp Book" Issue by mail artist Post 1211. The sheet was printed using a laser printer and was perforated using a "Whizbang" perforator.

Artistamps are created as one-off works of art, in limited editions, or as mass-produced product. Artistamps have been produced as multiples of one design per sheet; a multitude of designs per page; as miniature sheets with a decorative or inclusive border; in booklets; or any combination/size/shape the artist chooses.

Techniques for the creation of artistamps may include perforating the paper to resemble a traditional perforated stamp, as well as applying gum to the reverse side of the paper. Self-adhesive paper is also used. The image represented on the stamp may be hand-drawn or painted, lithographed or offset-printed, photographed, photocopied, etched, engraved, silk-screened, rubber stamped, or produced on a digital inkjet or laser printer. While the method of production is entirely the choice of the artist, creators who exclusively or primarily use rubber stamps are occasionally held in contempt by members of the artistamp community, some of whom refer to such producers as "bunny-stampers."

The personal computer, personal printer and color photocopier have served to democratize the means of production of artistamps. It is no coincidence that the early 1980s explosion in artistamp creation paralleled the development and widespread use of color photocopiers, and that a similar surge followed the ubiquity of personal computers and inexpensive color printers. Still, the lack of workable, widely available, cheap and accessible perforators have limited the number of artists who can create convincing simulacra of traditional perforated stamps.

Makers of artistamps sometimes apply cancellations to the stamps when affixing them to covers; first day of issue covers for artistamps also exist.

The rise of the Internet has seen the development of the concept of the so-called cyberstamp, a digital-only stamp-like image designed primarily to be viewed online and often sent with e-mail. Cyberstamps also allow the use of animated imagery. Whether a digital image, however, can be considered a "stamp" at all is a matter of dispute.

Artists working in the stamp art medium often employ fixed-line perforators as part of the creation process. Most functional and sought-after of these machines are cast-iron, pedal-operated devices manufactured beginning in the 1880s by bindery equipment makers like F.P Rosback Co. and Latham Machinery Co. Rosback also produced table-top perforators, but surviving models are exceedingly rare. Other methods for perforating paper to resemble stamp sheets have generally proven unsatisfactory. Such alternative methods used include using sewing machines, sewing pounces, leather punches, modified veterinary needles, and speciality scissors. Some owners of pedal-operated or motorized perforators sell pre-perforated paper and offer perforating services for a fee.

In 2018, postage stamp designer and mail art aficionado Niko Courtelis launched The Portland Stamp Company with his partners in Plazm. Artists were enabled to purchase blank, perforated, lick-and-stick stamps or to have their artwork printed on custom stamps at larger scale. Writing in Print magazine, design critic Steven Heller described The Portland Stamp Company's work as making stamps "the old-fashioned way - with perfs and glued backs."

In 2005 and 2006, a machinist operating under the name "Dr. Arcane" (Adrian West) manufactured and sold about 20 "Whizbang" perforators. These table-top devices worked well, but were reportedly fragile. In 2020, ten updated versions of the Whizbang perforator were offered by Dr. Arcane for sale on the International Union of Mail-Artists (IUOMA) forum. The new perforator has a solid metal frame that replaced the wooden frame designs of the 2005 and 2006 versions.

In 2004, the International Brotherhood of Perforator Workers (IBPW), an organization based in Washington, D.C., was established to represent the interests of artists owning and/or operating perforators in the creation of stamp art.

== See also ==
- Mail art
- Philately
- Artist trading cards
