= Anna Banana =

Canadian artist (1940–2024)

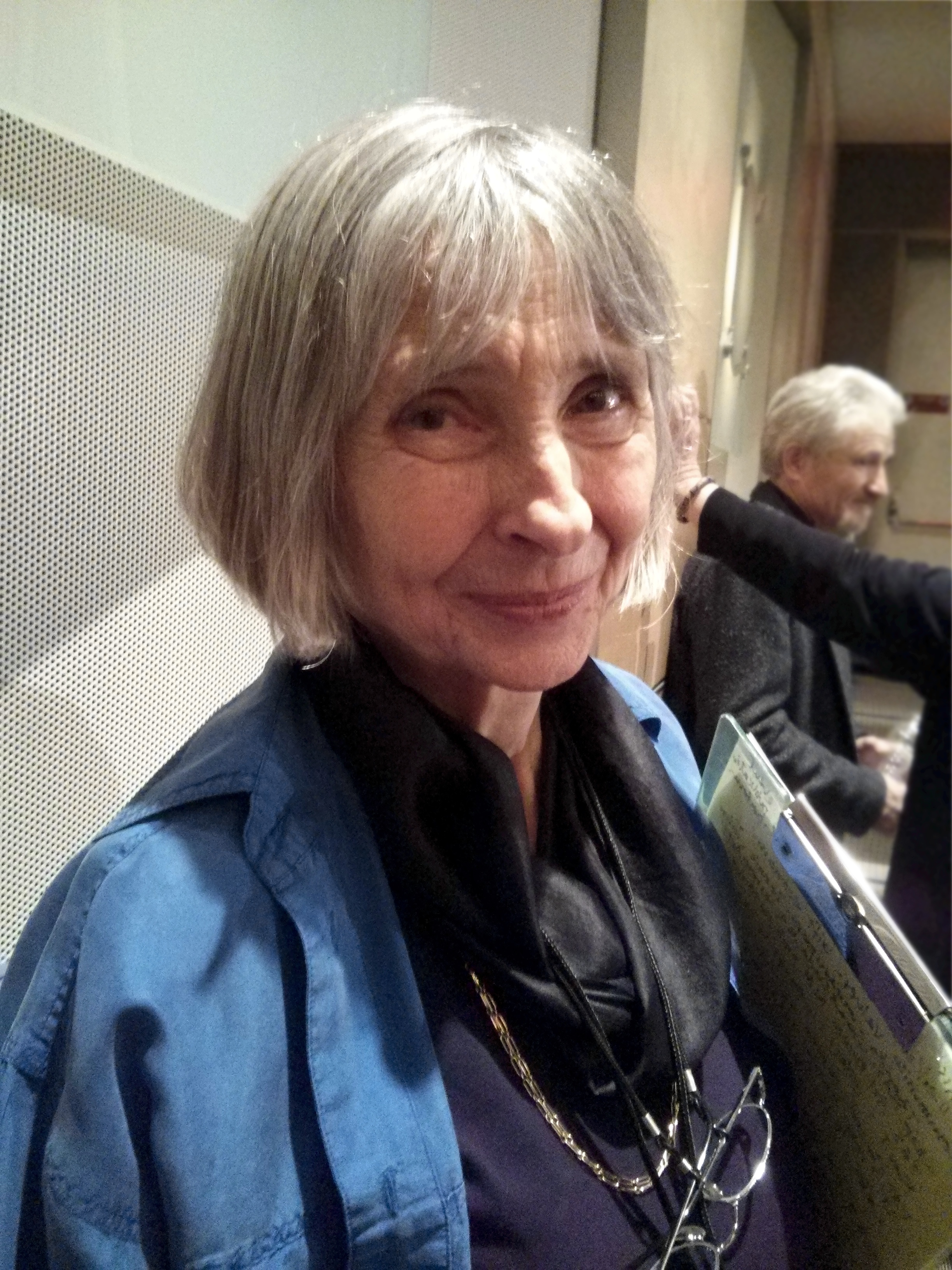
- Banana in 2014
- Born: Anne Lee Long; February 24, 1940; Victoria, British Columbia, Canada
- Died: November 29, 2024 (aged 84); Victoria, British Columbia, Canada
- Movement: Mail artist
- Website: http://mypage.uniserve.ca/~a_banana/

Anne Lee Long (February 24, 1940 – November 29, 2024), known professionally as Anna Banana, was a Canadian artist known for her mail art, performance art, writing, and work as a small press publisher. She has been described as an "entrepreneur and critic" who helped pioneer the artistamp, a postage-stamp-sized medium. She was prominent in the mail art network since the early 1970s, acting as a bridge between the movement's early history and its second generation. As a publisher, Banana launched Vile magazine and the "Banana Rag" newsletter; the latter became Artistamp News in 1996. Her archive of mail art-related papers is housed at the Morris and Helen Belkin Art Gallery at the University of British Columbia.

Banana lived in British Columbia and operated Banana Productions, calling herself the "Top Banana". The International Art Post was the sole publication of Banana Productions, with 700 copies produced for each edition. Banana died on November 29, 2024, at the age of 84.

== Career ==
Banana attended the University of British Columbia from 1958 to 1963, graduating with an elementary academic teaching certificate. She taught for five years: two in public schools and three in Vancouver's New School.

She began her career in Victoria as a fabric artist, where dissatisfaction with the marketing of her work led toward more-public expressions. In 1971, she declared herself the Town Fool of Victoria and organized a series of interactive events, eventually creating a newsletter, the Banana Rag, to reach a broader audience. She sent a copy to Vancouver artist Gary Lee Nova, who replied with an image-bank request list providing names, addresses and image requests of contemporary mail artists. This began a forty-year relationship with a worldwide, egalitarian art-communication network.

Like many mail artists, she embraced an alter ego. Anna Banana, which eventually became her legal name, was soon incorporated into correspondence with Ray Johnson, General Idea and the international postal art network.

BananaPost '89 artistamps by Anna Banana, 1989

In 1973, Banana moved to San Francisco to join mail-art friends known as the Bay Area Dadaists, who produced Neo-Dadaist performances, mail art and publications. She worked as a typesetter at a print shop, where the first issue of her magazine Vile magazine was printed in 1974. The shop—Speedprint—was a place she told writer Gretchen Wagner, "where it became apparent to me that anyone could be a publisher". Originally envisioned as a place to document and acknowledge network activity, Vile was a combination of art, poetry, fiction, letters, photos and manipulated advertisements from Life magazine. It was predominantly a visual publication, examining the flood of images emerging from mass communication. It was also a response to File magazine's shift towards mainstream art coverage. Gwen Allen wrote, "FILE would continue to publish the Image Bank image request lists until its Fall 1975 issue, but it would gradually distance itself from the mail art scene, prompting a string of takeoffs, including VILE—started, according to editor Anna Banana, in response to FILE's growing disdain for mail art'—and later, BILE and SMILE." Between 1974 and 1981, Banana published seven issues of VILE; editions four, six and seven were edited by her partner, Bill Gaglione. During its run, Vile explored a wide range of formats and media defining the mail-art genre. Banana cited as influences Dada humor, therapeutic madness and the Bohemianism of the Bay Area during the 1960s and early 1970s. Vile's nihilism fit the punk attitude on the rise in Britain and the United States at the time.

After returning to Canada in 1981, Banana published About Vile, a history of the magazine with a mail-art backlog and an account of a 1978 European tour by her and Gaglione (a documented conclusion of the pair's working relationship). That year Banana also organized a "Banana Art" event for the Global Television Network, held at Bridges Restaurant on Granville Island, Vancouver.

From 1983 to 1985, Banana worked in the production department of Intermedia Press, where she learned full-color printing (a skill used in her 1988 publication, International Art Post). IAP featured dry-gummed, pin-hole perforated sheets consisting of full-color stamps designed by artists. The works were financed cooperatively, with participating artists receiving 500 copies of their stamp and Banana Productions retaining the remainder for sales and promotion. IAP has become an annual publication; the 24th edition was released in October 2011.

In 1990, Banana created the Artistamp Collector's Album, a cloth bound limited edition of forty-nine silk-screened ring binders to house the IAP and the Artistamp News (letter) (ASN) (begun by Banana in 1991). Eight issues of ASN were published. Artist profiles, stamp news, new editions and several "tipped-in" (inserted and affixed as individual sheets, as opposed to being bound together in folded signatures) color stamps were featured in each issue. Banana then returned to general mail-art topics in the Banana Rag; edition 41 was published in September 2011.

In 1991, Banana created a miniature book and stamp sheet, 20 Years of Fooling Around with A. Banana, as the catalog for her twenty-year retrospective at the grunt gallery in Vancouver. Deluxe editions of the book feature stamps tipped-in over the black-and-white illustrations. She has received a number of grants from the Canada Council between 1975 and 2009.

=== Writing ===
In addition to the account of her years at the New School and editorials in Vile, Banana Rag and Artistamp News, Banana contributed two articles ("Mail Art Canada" and "Women in Mail Art") to the 1984 book Correspondence Art; Source Book for the Network of International Postal Art Activity published by La Mamelle. These articles were reprinted in 1984 in FFFlue, volume 4, numbers 3 and 4. Other print appearances include "The Transformation of Anne Long" in the March 1972 Maclean's magazine and "Banana Olympics: Sporty Art or Arty Sport" in the September 1980 Recreation Reporter. The magazine Rubberstampmadness published a series of her articles on mail artists: "Jeanie Eberhardt; the EberPlex Stamp Works" (September–October 2002); "Brain Waves at High Tide" (May–June 2001); "Mail Art Book Reviews: Umbrella Anthology & Mail Stones" (January–February 2001); "The Danish Mail Art Bug/Frank & Witta Jensen", Mar./Apr. 2000; "The Italian Connection/Vittore Baroni", Nov./Dec., 1999; "The Personal Touch/Peter & Angela Netmail", (May–June 1998) and "Artistamps in the Evolving Mail-Art Network" (May–June 1997). Banana's review, "Big is Beautiful at Venice Biennale", appeared in the August 1, 1999 Coast Independent and "Size does matter at Venice Biennale" in the August 26–September 2, 1999, free Vancouver weekly, The Georgia Straight. "Strategies of Audience Engagement" appeared in the 2005 book, DIY Survival.

=== Interactive events ===
In 1974, Banana accepted a job at the San Francisco Bay Guardian pasting up advertising pages. She filled the one-inch-by-one-column ad holes with invitations to her events; the first entry was for the 1974 Columbus Day Parade, offering "degrees of Bananology" to those who participated or sent banana news. In 1975, the Guardian ran a full-page ad for her Banana Olympics. It attracted over 100 contestants, who dressed up to compete in the overhand banana throw, the water-balance race and the four-legged race. Winners were those who crossed the finish line with the most "appeal", based on costume and style. It took place in the Embarcadero Plaza (with help from volunteers and the New Games Foundation), and was covered in the San Francisco Chronicle and the San Francisco Examiner.

In 1980, Banana was invited by art curator Rosa Ho to present the Banana Olympics at the Surrey, British Columbia Art Gallery. The event was funded by the Canada Council, the British Columbia Arts Council and the municipality of Surrey. Originally scheduled for April Fool's Day, the event was delayed for three months while Ho defended it to a Surrey councillor who believed the event was not art; this inspired Banana to create the Bureaucrat's Marathon: three steps forward, two backwards and one to each side. The event took place on 13 July on the athletic field bordering the gallery, with over 100 participants. Banana and Gaglione finished the year with a Canadian tour (Toward the Future, a program of futurist theatre works) in fifteen cities across Canada from Victoria to Halifax.

=== Performances ===
Throughout the 1970s, Banana continued with parade entries, April Fool's Day events, and collaborations with Bay-area Dadaists on Dada sound poetry and Italian Futurist syntheses presented at the San Francisco Book Fair, San Jose State University and the Saturday Afternoon Club in Ukiah. In 1978, Banana and Gaglione presented their "Futurist Sound" performance in A Literal Exchange at A Space in Toronto. That fall they began a European tour arranged through Banana's mail-art network, presenting "Futurist Sound" and her Banana Olympics film in 29 cities in 11 countries. In 1979, they presented the works again at the Living Art Performance Festival in Vancouver, and in 1980 at San Francisco State University, the San Francisco Art Institute, San Jose State University, the Inter-Dada 80 Festival in Ukiah, San Diego State University, University of California, Irvine and Long Beach, and the LA Dada festival in Los Angeles.

In 1981, Banana moved back to Vancouver and received funding for a new solo work, "Why Banana?". Beginning in the fall of 1982, she began presenting "Why Banana?" in nine cities across Canada, at the University of South Carolina and Modern Realism in Dallas, Texas. That year her Going Bananas Fashion Contest was also hosted live on CKVU's Vancouver Show, attracting 25 participants.

Banana's performances and tours continued through the 1980s. During the San Francisco InterDADA 84 Festival she performed her In the Red, was Greeter at the Headquarters and lectured at the Goethe Institute. In the 1990s, she continued with an installation and performance in Copenhagen and performances of "Why Banana?" in Umeå, Sweden and at In the Red/In the Black in The Hague, Netherlands. In 1993, she presented herself as Dr. Anna Freud Banana of the Specific Research Institute, who discovered the psychology behind the "New German Banana Consciousness". In each of 12 venues Banana installed 105 blow-ups of newspaper and magazine articles about bananas from the German press (supporting her claim that Germany had gone bananas) and asking visitors to take her Roar Shack Banana Peel Test and Personality Inventory for Banana Syndrome (based on the Minnesota Multiphasic Personality Inventory).

Banana's most recent interactive research, "But is it Art?...", asks her audience to record their yes-or-no responses to 30 images of artworks (many banana-themed) on her Specific Research response form. Participants then complete the reverse side with name, contact information, age, education, answer questions about art, draw a self-portrait and complete a "turn these lines into something recognizable" exercise. As with all her interactive works, Banana is more interested in ascertaining how much her audience will engage in her research than whether the images she projects are considered art. In 2009, she presented this work in Rome, Cararra, Gent, Minden, Berlin, Annaberg, Budapest, Bremen and Aarlborg, in 2010 in Victoria, British Columbia, and in 2011 in Charleroi, Belgium, Maastricht, Netherlands, Bergish-Gladbach, and Berlin, Germany.

=== Curating ===
In 1983, Banana organized a mail-art show ("Show Your Colors") for the Arts, Sciences and Technology Center in Vancouver, producing a catalog for the 246 artists (from 32 countries) who participated. In 1987, she curated the performance series for the Artropolis Show in Vancouver, producing a new work with Ron Brunette (The World Series) presented at the Western Front.

In 1998, Banana curated "Artistamps", an exhibit from the International Mail-Art Network of her collection of mail art, for the Sechelt Art Center in Sechelt, British Columbia. With minor changes, it was remounted in 1999 as the "Popular Art of Postal Parody" at the Richmond, British Columbia Art Gallery and in 2000 at the Open Space Gallery in Victoria.

=== Exhibitions ===
Some of Banana's work has been part of larger exhibitions:

- Anna Banana: 45 Years of Fooling Around with A. Banana: The Art Gallery of Greater Victoria and Open Space Arts Society (2015), Pratt Institute Libraries (2016)
- Fluxus to the Internet: Szepmuveszeti Museum, Budapest (2007)
- Leck Mich!, Lick Me! Artistamps since the 1960s: Neues Museum Weserburg, Bremen (2007)
- Stamp Art and Artists Stamps: The Art Institute of Boston (2000)
- Mail Art and Artistamps: Chicago Center for the Book Arts, Columbia College (1997)
- Browser Box: Artropolis at the Round House, Vancouver (1997)
- Image and Text: Sage Junior College of Albany (1996)
- Mail Art: Netzwerk der Kunstler, PTT (postal) Museum, Bern, Switzerland (1994)
- Third International Artistamp Biennial: Davidson Galleries, Seattle (1993)
- Timbres d'Artistes: Musee de la Poste, Paris (September 1993–January 1994)
- Some Zines: Boise State University (1992)
- Art Travels: Mail Art Festival, National Postal Museum-Museum of Civilization, Hull, QC (1992)
- Pacific Northwest Artistamp Collective: Davidson Galleries, Seattle (1989)
- Vancouver Art and Artists 1931-1983: Vancouver Art Gallery (group exhibit, 1983)
- Performance Art Festival, Brussels, Belgium, Group show 1978 curator Roger D'Hondt
- 'Performance Art', Stadsarchiv Kassel, Germany, during Documenta 6 (1977), group show, curator Roger D'Hondt

=== Smaller exhibits ===
- The Art of Anna Banana: Galerie Galerij, Zierikzee, Netherlands (solo exhibit, May–June 2009)
- Anna Banana: Networking Publications: Research Center for Artists' Publications, Weserburg Museum, Bremen, Germany (solo exhibit, April–July, 2009)
- The Arts of Anna Banana: Sarenco Art Club Gallery, Verona, Italy (solo exhibit and performance, 1998)
- Anna Banana: Guy Bleus' E-Mail-Art Archives, Centrum Beeldende Kunsten, Hasselt, Belgium (solo exhibit, August 1998)
- International Salon des Artistamps: Gallery Fifty-Six (three-person exhibit, 1992)
- 20 Years of fooling Around with a. Banana (solo retrospective): grunt gallery, Vancouver
- Banana Split: Installation in Vancouver's Warehouse Show (1984) and (with performance) Husets Gallery, Copenhagen, Denmark
- Bananagrams: Union Gallery, San Jose State University (1981)
- Banana and Gaglione: Ecart, Geneve, Switzerland and Stempelplaats Gallery, Amsterdam (1978)
- Anna Banana, New Reform, Aalst, Belgium (1977)

=== Collections ===
Complete sets of all published works were purchased by the first two institutions; the remainder obtained copies at publication during the 1970s.

- Archivio Conz
- Weserburg Museum-Research Centre Artists Publications, Bremen (2009)
- Harvard University Fine Arts Library (2009)
- Vile magazine: Beinecke Rare Book and Manuscript Library, Yale University (2006)
- Smithsonian Institution
- National Gallery of Art
- Museum of Modern Art
- Institute of Contemporary Art, Philadelphia
- AAP Archive Artist Publications
- Archive Sohm, Germany
- San Francisco Museum of Modern Art
- Pompidou National Museum, Paris
- Art Gallery of Ontario, Toronto
- National Gallery of Australia
- Morris and Helen Belkin Art Gallery
- Muse de Art Contemp., São Paulo
- Museo de Bellas Arts, Caracas
- Otis College of Art and Design
- Vancouver Art Gallery
- Sackner Archive, Miami Beach, Florida
- LAICA, Los Angeles, California
- New York Public Library
- Oakland Museum of California
- Sculpture Center, Sydney
- Franklin Furnace Archive
- Art Bank, Ottawa
- Library and Archives Canada
- National Gallery of Canada
- J. Paul Getty Museum
- National Postal Museum, Ottawa
- New Reform Archives, Aalst,
- University of British Columbia Library
