= Vittore Baroni =

Italian artist

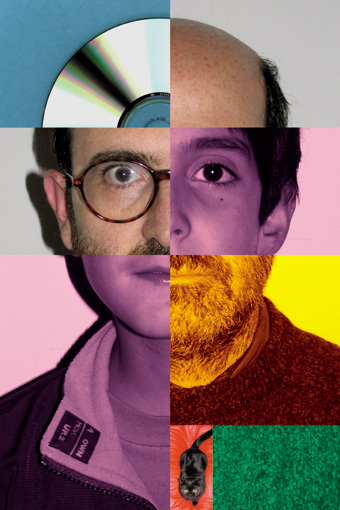
Vittore Baroni by Piermario Ciani

Vittore Baroni (born 1956 in Forte dei Marmi, Italy), is an Italian mailartist, music critic and explorer of countercultures. Since the mid-1970s he has been one of the most active and respected promoters and documenters of mail art.

He has written or edited various books on aspects of the “networking cultures” that anticipated the Internet, among which is the mail art guide book, Arte Postale. He has also contributed to many of the seminal works about mail art published in recent decades, including Chuck Welch's Eternal Network, H.R. Fricker's I am a Networker (Sometimes), and Renaud Siegmann's Mail Art, Art postal - Art posté.

In the past three decades he has organized many exhibitions, events, publications and collective projects in the fields of mail art, audio art, visual poetry, underground comics and street art, including 100 issues of Arte Postale! mail art magazine. He was the originator of formative networking projects such as the TRAX modular system (1981–1987), the multiple names Lieutenant Murnau and Luther Blissett, the Stickerman project and F.U.N. (Funtastic United Nations, since 2001). In 2026, Vittore Baroni published God Glue Glamour Zine, a collection of collages created with Nicola Stradiotto. It was published by Fantasma Distro and features a preface by Matteo Torcinovich.

He is based in Viareggio, Italy.

== Mail Art and Arte Postale! ==
Vittore Baroni was introduced to the mail art network in 1977 through Guglielmo Achille Cavellini, and instantly became heavily involved, participating every year in dozens of international projects and shows. From 1979 he organized a series of Mail Art exhibitions for the Forte dei Marmi Town Library and published the first issue of his enduring magazine Arte Postale! During the summer of 1995 there was a retrospective exhibition of all Arte Postale! magazines (1979-1995) in Guy Bleus' E-Mail Art Archives in the provincial Centre for Arts (now Art Museum Z33) in Hasselt, Belgium.

In 1992 he created, with Piermario Ciani, the Stickerman Museum devoted to all forms of adhesive art. In addition to writing the influential books, Arte Postale, guida al network della corrispondenza creativa (1997) and Postcarts – Cartoline d’artista (2005), he also edited the books Rubber Stamp Art by John Held Jr. (1999) and Artistamps by James Warren Felter (2002)

In 2000, Baroni was Curator of the Mail Art section for a large retrospective exhibition on the art avant-gardes of the 20th century, Sentieri Interrotti at the Museo d'Arte Moderna of Bassano del Grappa. He is co-founder of the cultural association BAU in Viareggio.

He has also conceived and coordinated several major international networking projects –

- IM98: A Year Of Incongruous Meetings (1998).
- The F.U.N. (Funtastic United Nations) project (2002) with Piermario Ciani, which included the publication of the multimedia box Mail 4 FUN, and a series of exhibitions, Philatelic FUN
- Bank of FUN (2003) featuring a portfolio of artist’s banknotes from imaginary countries
- Obscure Actions (2004)
- Klang! Sound art festival (2009)
- Art Detox (2010)

Baroni's 30th Anniversary in mail art was celebrated with a series of exhibitions and projects in Viareggio and Berlin, documented in six issues of Arte Postale! magazine, and culminating in the final, 100th edition in 2009. A boxed set of the complete collection of Arte Postale! was acquired by the Mart Museum in Rovereto in 2010.

== Music and Audio ==
Baroni has produced and published audio works since 1980 when he began recording under the pseudonym Lieutenant Murnau. The following year he founded, with Piermario Ciani, the international multimedia group TRAX to producing magazines, cassettes, records, t-shirts and live shows, and in 1991 he joined the musical project Le Forbici di Manitù which continues to release CD editions.

He has also worked as a music journalist. In 1982, he became a staff writer for the rock monthly Rockerilla; in 1989, he contributed to the monumental Enciclopedia Rock Anni ’80 by Arcana Editrice; and in 1992, he co-founded, with Claudio Sorge and Alberto Campo, the monthly rock magazine Rumore.

== Lieutenant Murnau ==
Lieutenant Murnau was invented as the name of a “ghost musical group”. It was started in 1980 and ended in 1984. The image the group used came from a photograph of film director Friedrich Wilhelm Murnau while serving as a lieutenant in the German army. This photograph was taken and reproduced on to posters, leaflets, fanzines, badges and all other memorabilia of pop mythology to create an interest in something that did not exist.

Lt. Murnau managed to produce various records and cassettes without Baroni playing a single note, simply releasing mixes of recorded music. The "Meet Lt. Murnau" tape, for example, was a deliberate confusion of Beatles and The Residents records. He also used soundtracks of F.W. Murnau's films and music provided by other groups in hommage to Murnau. To mess up things even more, he had some of these tapes and records released in different countries by different people.

Lt. Murnau also appeared on stage, masked, mixing different records and crucifying a Beatles LP. Hundreds of life-size Lt. Murnau-cardboard masks were printed which people could wear. Anybody could make Lt. Murnau music and become Lt. Murnau, and a few people did it. The whole project was focussed on a very limited idea, that of underground music, and did not have the broader implications of the Monty Cantsin or Luther Blissett multiple user name philosophy.
