= PostHype =

1980's New York City zine

PostHype was a mail art zine founded by John P. Jacob in 1981. The first issue was created, using pressed Letraset on paper, as a birthday gift to the artist Steven Durland, and modeled on Durland's satirical mini-magazine Tacit. Each of the first four post-card sized issues of PostHype was printed using an original rubber stamp by Jacob, hand carved from photographs made using the photo-booth machine at the Times Square arcade known as Playland, which recorded the visits of other mail artists to New York City. Later issues expanded to document various mail art projects organized by Jacob.

In 1983, PostHype 2(5) documented Jacob's project "The Catalogue of Ideas." Having found a trove of discarded, unmarked bank envelopes in a dumpster, Jacob stamped them with the words "Life," "Time," "Death," and "Hunger," wrapped each group of four with a paper band, and asked recipients to transform and return the envelopes to him. "Words," Jacob wrote in the invitation to participate, "are the translation of ideas, made specific and personal by the specific persons who use them." Recipients were asked to respond to the words "in any manner, using the generic form (the small envelopes) as the point of origination." Rather grandiloquently, in the documentation Jacob declared "Consider this 'Catalogue of Ideas,'[...] as Lascaux condensed." Eighty-five artists from twenty-six nations returned envelopes to Jacob, a selection of which were reproduced in the periodical along with a complete list of participants enclosed in a bank envelope marked "Artists." Included among the usual suspects were Ray Johnson, Richard Kostelanetz, and Carl Andre (who proclaimed the project absurd).

In 1984, as a participant in the two-day Artists Talk on Art panels related to the exhibition "Mail Art: Then and Now" at the Franklin Furnace, New York, Jacob transcribed and published the contentious exchanges between colleagues in Posthype 3(1), "Mail Art: A Partial Anatomy." Increasingly interested in issues related to censorship, and working with artists in the Soviet Bloc countries of then Eastern Europe, the final issue of PostHype (4(1)) documented a mail and telephone art project entitled "East/West: Mail Art & Censorship." PostHype was discontinued in 1985. A promised new periodical, to be titled Occasional Correspondence, never materialized. In 1987, in a self-proclaimed withdrawal from the mail art community, Jacob self-published The Coffee Table Book of Mail Art: The Intimate Letters of J.P. Jacob. With an advertisement declaring "Each copy contains a valuable original artwork by a famous mailartist!!" Jacob gave away original works from his mail art collection to all recipients of the publication, until both he and it were exhausted.

In an undated article entitled "(mis)reading m@ilart," author Matt Ferranto describes PostHype in relation to other mail art zines of the period. "The new availability of quick, inexpensive xerographic printing machines," according to Ferranto, "coupled with the circulation of thousands of names and addresses in such mail art-oriented publications as DOC(K)S in France, Arte Postale in Italy, and Posthype in the United States led many new mail artists to mass mail printed matter to as many individuals as possible. In a situation reminiscent of the potlatch that so fascinated Bataille, these artists engaged in a competition of giving that introduced rivalry and antagonism into the mail art network. Attempting to gain prestige by demonstrating their ability to absorb great expenditures, they also took a perverse approach towards the idea of gift exchange.[...] Many experienced mail artists complained of an 'explosion of junk mail and self-serving egotism.'" Citing Fluxus historian Ken Friedman, Ferranto argues that many such projects were originated by "artists unaware of history and community tr[ying] to become the leading figure in the network," whose aggressive actions spoiled their own nest. The paradoxical issue of mail art fame was already noted by Chuck Welch, in 1986, in his book Networking Currents. Indeed, this was one among the many complaints made by Jacob, the editor as petulant chief despoiler, in a series of essays disclosing his gradual alienation from the mail art community. Mail artist and historian Géza Perneczky, on the other hand, lists PostHype as among the major sources of information pertinent to the mail art activities of the 1980s.

A complete run of PostHype, self-published under the imprint of Jacob's Riding Beggar Press, was acquired by the Museum of Modern Art, New York, in 1987. Incomplete sets are held by the Getty Museum (acquired with the Jean Brown Papers) and mail art archives such as the Artpool Art Research Center. Jacob's papers and the archive of the Riding Beggar Press are held by the Beinecke Library at Yale University.
