= John P. Jacob =

American curator (born 1957)

John P. Jacob (born 1957) is an American curator. He grew up in Italy and Venezuela, graduated from the Collegiate School (1975) in New York City, and studied at the University of Chicago before earning a BA in human ecology from the College of the Atlantic (1981) and an MA in art history from Indiana University (1994).

== Mailart and photography ==
PostHype v3 n1, 1984

The Howling Mad Mail, 1985

I'm Trying to See, 1988

John Jacob began his career as an artist, working with reproductive media including photography, Xerography, rubber-stamps, mail-art, and artist's books. During the 1980s, he taught classes on color Xerox and the rubber stamp as a print-making medium, at Pratt Manhattan, with mail-artist Ed Plunkett, and founded the Riding Beggar Press ("If wishes were horses...") to promote his and other artists' work. His first sale, of a sheet of artists' stamps for $75, was from an exhibition curated by Buster Cleveland for the 13th Hour Gallery (NY, 1984).

Jacob's efforts during this period include the irregular mail-art magazine PostHype (1981–85), and the International Portfolio of Artists' Photography (1983–86), an assembling book project conceived to integrate mail-art, book-art, and photography. Increasingly interested in issues related to censorship, and working with artists in the Soviet Bloc countries of Eastern Europe, the final issue of PostHype (4.1) documented a mail- and phone-art project entitled East/West: Mail Art & Censorship. In 1987, in a self-proclaimed withdrawal from mail-art, Jacob published The Coffee Table Book of Mail Art: The Intimate Letters of J.P. Jacob. With an advertisement declaring "Each copy contains a valuable original artwork by a famous mailartist!!" Jacob gave away original works to recipients of the publication until his collection was exhausted. Jacob continued to exhibit as a photographer through the 1980s, presenting his last one-person exhibition, entitled I'm Trying to See, at the Liget Galeria, Budapest, in 1988. He occasionally exhibited under the pseudonym Janos Jaczkó after that.

== Eastern Europe and USSR ==
Recollecting a Culture: Photography and the Evolution of a Socialist Aesthetic in East Germany, 1999.

Since the mid-1980s, Jacob has worked with artists in Eastern Europe and the former USSR, guest-curating exhibitions for institutions in the United States and Europe, including the Liget Gallery, Budapest, Hungary, the List Visual Arts Center at MIT, the Allen Memorial Art Museum at Oberlin College, and the Staatliche Galerie Moritzburg, Halle (Saale), Germany. From 1986 to 1989, he was supported by grants from the Soros Foundations, Hungary and USSR. Émigré writer Jerzy Kosinski contributed an introductory statement to the exhibition Out of Eastern Europe: Private Photography (1987), describing the work presented as "the penultimate art of spiritual confrontation". Jacob's exhibition The Missing Picture: Alternative Contemporary Photography in the Soviet Union (1990) was the first one-person exhibition of Ukrainian photographer Boris Mikhailov in the US, accompanied by a parallel exhibition of works by four young Soviet photographers inspired by him.

Recollecting a Culture: Photography and the Evolution of a Socialist Aesthetic in East Germany (1999), commemorating the 10th anniversary of the fall of the Berlin Wall, presented the archive of the FotoKino Verlag, publisher of the GDR's professional photography periodical, Fotografie, with works dating from 1929 to 1989. The American photographer and theorist Diane Neumaier, in her history of Soviet non-conformist photography, credited Jacob's work as foundational to that of later historians such as herself. His essay "After Roskolnikov: Russian Photography Today," edited by Neumaier for the College Art Association's Art Journal, critically examined the impact of Western attention, including his own, on the art of post-Perestroika Russia.

== Career and research ==
Jacob has been an arts administrator since the 1990s. He became director of exhibitions for the Photographic Resource Center at Boston University in 1992, and was named executive director in 1993. Jacob's exhibitions for the PRC include There is No Eye, a retrospective of photographer/musician John Cohen (2002), and Facing Death: Portraits from Cambodia’s Killing Fields (with Robert E. Seydel, 1997). Other exhibitions Jacob curated for the PRC explored the intersections of photography with dance and music, including the first presentation of photographs by Lou Reed.

In 2003, Jacob was named founding director of the Inge Morath Foundation by Morath's husband, playwright Arthur Miller, and daughter, film-maker Rebecca Miller, and in 2014 facilitated the acquisition of the Morath archive by the Beinecke Library at Yale University and a collection of her master prints by the Yale University Art Gallery. From 2011 to 2015, he served as Program Director for the Magnum Foundation's Legacy Program, and as contributing editor for Esopus (magazine) re-created early Magnum distributions, in a series entitled "Analog Recovery," from the vast Magnum archive. He is presently McEvoy Family Curator for Photography at the Smithsonian American Art Museum. Among Jacob's exhibitions for SAAM, the Art Newspaper ranked Diane Arbus: A box of ten photographs the first most visited photography exhibition and the ninth most visited art exhibition worldwide for 2019, with 1,677,000 attendees; and it ranked Trevor Paglen: Sites Unseen the thirteenth most visited art exhibition, with 1,132,800 attendees.

Jacob is married to Noriko Fuku, professor and director of the Art Communication Research Center at the Kyoto University of Art and Design (semi-retired 2017). Jacob's curatorial projects with Fuku include Patti Smith & Friends: Drawings by Patti Smith, Polaroids by Oliver Ray, and Photographs by Michael Stipe (2002), for the Museum Eki, Kyoto, and Man Ray: Unconcerned But Not Indifferent (2007), for the PhotoEspaña photography festival, Madrid. The exhibition traveled throughout Europe and to the National Museums of Japan in Tokyo and Osaka.

Jacob's papers and the archive of the Riding Beggar Press are held by the Beinecke Library at Yale University.

== Selected exhibitions ==
- James Presley Ball and Robert S. Duncanson: An African American Artistic Collaboration. Co-curator with Eleanor Harvey and Jill Rothschild. Smithsonian American Art Museum, Washington, D.C., 2023.
- Carrie Mae Weems: Looking Forward, Looking Back. Co-curator with Saisha Grayson. Smithsonian American Art Museum, Washington, D.C., 2023.
- Welcome Home: A Portrait of East Baltimore, 1975–1980, Smithsonian American Art Museum, Washington, D.C., 2021.
- New on View: Dawoud Bey and William H. Johnson. Smithsonian American Art Museum, Washington, D.C., 2020.
- Trevor Paglen: Sites Unseen. Smithsonian American Art Museum, Washington, D.C., 2018.
- Diane Arbus: A box of ten photographs. Smithsonian American Art Museum, Washington, D.C., 2018.
- Harlem Heroes: Photographs by Carl Van Vechten. Smithsonian American Art Museum, Washington, D.C., 2016.
- No Mountains in the Way: Photographs from the Kansas Documentary Survey, 1974. Coordinator for Smithsonian American Art Museum, Washington, D.C., 2016.
- Willie Alexander: Wallworks. Co-curator with Noriko Fuku. Esopus Space, New York, 2012.
- Erich Hartmann: New York Stories, 1946–57. Co-curator with Anna Patricia Kahn. Amerika Haus, Munich, Germany, 2012.
- Inge Morath: First Color. Magnum Photos Gallery, Paris, France, 2009.
- Well Disposed and Trying to See: Inge Morath & Arthur Miller in China. University of Michigan Art Museum, Ann Arbor, 2008.
- Man Ray: Unconcerned But Not Indifferent. Co-curator with Noriko Fuku. European Tour: PHotoESPAÑA / Museo ICO, Madrid, Spain, traveled 2007–2009. Japanese Tour: New National Art Centre, Tokyo, traveled 2010–2012.
- Eye in the World / The World in Me: Photographs by Peter Granser, Laura McPhee, Selina Ou, and Kiriko Shirobayashi. Pingyao International Photography Festival, Pingyao, China, 2006.
- Chinese Encounters: Words and Photographs by Inge Morath & Arthur Miller. Pingyao International Photography Festival, Pingyao, China, 2005.
- The Road to Reno: Photographs by Inge Morath. Chicago Cultural Center, 2005 Traveled 2005–09.
- There is No Eye: Photographs by John Cohen. Photographic Resource Center, Boston, 2002.
- Recollecting a Culture: Photography and the Evolution of East German Socialism. Selections from the FotoKino Archives, 1947–1990. Photographic Resource Center, Boston, 1999.
- Patti Smith & Friends, Drawings by Patti Smith, Polaroids by Oliver Ray, and Photographs by Michael Stipe. Co-curator with Noriko Fuku. Museum Eki, Kyoto, Japan, 1999.
- Facing Death: Portraits from Cambodia’s Killing Fields. Co-curator with Robert E. Seydel. Photographic Resource Center, Boston, 1997.
- Chimæra: Aktuelle Photokunst aus Mitteleuropa. Co- curator with T.O. Immisch. Staatliche Galerie Moritzburg, Halle, Germany, 1997.
- Extended Play: Photographs, Video, Fashion Design, and Works on Paper by Musicians (Willie Alexander, Laurie Anderson, Peter Blegvad, John Cohen, Kevin Coyne, Chris Cutler, Kim Gordon, Mike Gordon, Tony Levin, Eric Meza, Lou Reed, Vernon Reid, Patti Smith, and Sandra Stark). Photographic Resource Center, Boston, 1997.
- Matthias Leupold: Fahnenappell & Gartenlaube. Photographic Resource Center, Boston, 1995.
- Photographs by Dennis Hopper: 1961–1967. Co-curator with Robert E. Seydel. Photographic Resource Center, Boston, 1994.
- Return and Exile: Sylvia Plachy's Photographs from Central Europe and Susan Rubin Suleiman's Budapest Diary. Photographic Resource Center, Boston, 1994.
- Other Africas: Photographs by Max Belcher, Fazal Sheikh, and Vera Viditz-Ward. Photographic Resource Center, Boston, 1993.
- Virginia Beahan & Laura McPhee: No Ordinary Land. Photographic Resource Center, Boston, 1992.
- The Missing Picture: Boris Michailov. List Visual Arts Center at MIT, Cambridge, Mass., 1990.
- The Missing Picture: Alternative Contemporary Photography in the Soviet Union (Vladimir Kupreanov, Ilya Piganov, Maria Serebrjakova, Alexey Shulgin). List Visual Arts Center at MIT, Cambridge, Mass., 1990.
- Hidden Story: Samizdat from Hungary and Elsewhere. Co-curator with Tibor Várnagy. Franklin Furnace Archive, New York, 1990.
- The Metamorphic Medium: Contemporary Photography from Hungary. Allen Memorial Art Museum, Oberlin, Ohio, 1989.
- Leupold/Leupold. Portland School of Art, Portland, ME, 1988.
- The Photo Diary of Anna Bohdziewicz (selections from 1986–89). Photographic Resource Center, Boston, 1987.
- Out of Eastern Europe: Private Photography. List Visual Arts Center at MIT, Cambridge, Mass., 1987.
- Second International Portfolio of Artists' Photography. Liget Galeria & Galeria 11, Budapest, Hungary, 1986.
- First International Portfolio of Artists' Photography. Büro fur Kunstlerische, Trogen, Switzerland, 1983.

== Selected publications ==
- "Depicting Love in Diane Arbus’s 'A woman with her baby monkey, 1971'." SAAM Eye Level (April 7, 2022)
- "The Year of Photography: A Remembrance of Joan Clark Netherwood." SAAM Eye Level (March 29, 2021)
- "Time Travel with Tibor Várnagy" in Várnagy Tibor: Photos without Camera, 1985–1993, ACB Research Lab, Budapest, Hungary, 2019. ISBN 9786150034904
- Trevor Paglen: Sites Unseen. Washington, D.C.: Smithsonian American Art Museum, 2018. ISBN 1911282336
- Diane Arbus: A box of ten photographs. Washington, D.C.: Smithsonian American Art Museum, and Aperture Foundation, New York, 2018. ISBN 1597114391
- Harlem Heroes: Photographs by Carl Van Vechten. Washington, D.C.: Smithsonian American Art Museum, 2016. ISBN 9780937311844
- Inge Morath: On Style. New York: Abrams, 2016. ISBN 1419722344
- Ernst Haas: On Set. Göttingen: Steidl Verlag, 2015. ISBN 3869305878
- "Analog Recovery 4: Starry Night: Photographs by Dennis Stock." Esopus 20 (Spring 2014)
- "Analog Recovery 3: Rosita's Pigeons: Photographs by Burt Glinn." Esopus 19 (Spring 2013)
- "Analog Recovery 2: Home Studio: Photographs by Erich Hartmann." Esopus 18 (Spring 2012)
- Kodak Girl: The Martha Cooper Collection. Göttingen: Steidl Verlag, 2011. ISBN 3869303247
- "Inge Morath: the Mask Series with Saul Steinberg". Foam 26 (Spring 2011), Amsterdam
- "Analog Recovery 1: Bal d’Hiver: Photographs by Inge Morath." Esopus 17 (Fall 2011)
- Man Ray: Unconcerned But Not Indifferent (Japanese edition, with Noriko Fuku). Tokyo: National Art Center/Nikkei, Inc., 2010.
- Man Ray: Trees + Flowers, Insects Animals. Göttingen: Steidl Verlag, 2009. ISBN 386521696X
- Inge Morath: First Color. Göttingen: Steidl Verlag, 2009. ISBN 3865219306
- Inge Morath: Iran. Göttingen: Steidl Verlag, 2009. ISBN 3865216978
- Man Ray: Unconcerned But Not Indifferent (first European edition, with Noriko Fuku). Madrid: La Fabrica, 2007. ISBN 8496466809
- Inge Morath: The Road to Reno. Göttingen: Steidl Verlag, 2006. ISBN 3865212034
- "The Artistic Vision of Edwin Land", in American Perspectives: Photographs from the Polaroid Collection, Michiko Kasahara, ed. Tokyo: Tokyo Metropolitan Museum of Photography, 2000. ISBN 9784473017635
- "End Paper: Redefining the People's Culture in East Germany". Chronicle of Higher Education, January 14, 2000
- Recollecting a Culture: Photography and the Evolution of a Socialist Aesthetic in East Germany. Boston: Photographic Resource Center at Boston University, 1998
- "Seeing Sound/Hearing Sight: Christian Marclay". Rundbrief Fotografie, Wolfgang Jaworek ed., 1998 5(3), Stuttgart, Germany
- Patti Smith and Friends: Drawings by Patti Smith, Polaroid by Oliver Ray, and Photography by Michael Stipe (with Noriko Fuku). Kyoto: Museum EKI, 1998
- Chimaera: Aktuelle Photokunst aus Mitteleruopa (with T.O. Immisch). Halle: Staatliche Galerie Moritzburg, 1997. ISBN 3928833979
- "Introduction", in Matthias Leupold: Living Pictures 1983–95. Schöppingen: Künstlerdorf Schöppingen, 1996
- "After Roskolnikov: Russian Photography Today." Art Journal, Summer 1994 53(2), 22–27
- "Aesthetic Revolution or Personal Evolution?" in Eternal Network: A Mailart Anthology, Chuck Welch ed. Calgary: University of Calgary Press, 1994
- "Photoglyphs", in Photoglyphs: Rimma & Valeriy Gerlovin, Mark Sloan ed. New Orleans Museum of Art, 1993. ISBN 0894940449
- The Missing Picture: Alternative Contemporary Photography from the Soviet Union. Cambridge: List Visual Arts Center at MIT, 1991
- "Perspectives, Real & Imaginary: Czechoslovakian Photography at FotoFest." Spot, Houston Center for Photography, Winter 1991
- Hidden Story: Samizdat from Hungary and Elsewhere (with Tibor Varnagy). New York: Franklin Furnace, 1990
- "Recalling Hajas" in Nightmare Works: Tibor Hajas (with Steven S. High). Richmond: Anderson Art Gallery at Virginia Commonwealth University, 1990
- "Metamorphic Game: The Art of Rimma & Valeriy Gerlovin", in Still Performances, Katy Kline ed. Cambridge: List Visual Arts Center at MIT, 1989
- The Metamorphic Medium: New Photography from Hungary. Oberlin: Allen Memorial Art Museum, 1989
- "The Legacy of Witkacy." Spot, Houston Center for Photography, Spring 1989, 4–7
- I am Trying to See. Budapest: Liget Gallery, 1988
- Thomas Florscheutz (with Steven S. High). Richmond: Anderson Art Gallery at Virginia Commonwealth University, 1988
- "The Politics of Experience: Identity and Identification in Documentary Photography". Views NE Journal of Photography, Winter 1987. Boston: Photographic Resource Center at Boston University
- Out of Eastern Europe: Private Photography. Cambridge: List Visual Arts Center at MIT, 1987
- The Second International Portfolio of Artists' Photography: Photography by Eastern European Artists (with Tibor Várnagy). Budapest: Liget Gallery and New York: Riding Beggar Press, 1986
- The First International Portfolio of Artists' Photography. New York: Riding Beggar Press, 1985

== Awards ==
- First Prize, Exhibition Catalogs for Diane Arbus: A box of ten photographs, Museum Publications Design Competition, American Alliance of Museums, 2019
- Finalist, Lucie Photo Book Prize for Diane Arbus: A box of ten photographs, Lucie Foundation, New York, 2019
- Shpilman International Prize for Excellence in Photography, Israel Museum, Jerusalem, 2012
- Die schönsten Bucher Award, Siftung Buchkunst, Berlin, for Inge Morath: The Road to Reno, 2007
