= Email art =

Type of digital art

Email art refers to artwork created for the medium of email. It includes computer graphics, animations, screensavers, digital scans of artwork in other media, and even ASCII art. When exhibited, Email art can be either displayed on a computer screen or similar type of display device, or the work can be printed out and displayed.

Email art is an evolution of the networking Mail Art movement and began during the early 1990s. Chuck Welch, also known as Cracker Jack Kid, connected with early online artists and created a net-worker telenetlink. The historical evolution of the term "Email art" is documented in Chuck Welch's Eternal Network: A Mail Art Anthology published and edited by University of Calgary Press.

By the end of the 1990s, many mailartists, aware of increasing postal rates and cheaper internet access, were beginning the gradual migration of collective art projects towards the web and new, inexpensive forms of digital communication. The Internet facilitated faster dissemination of Mail Art calls (invitations), Mail Art blogs and websites have become commonly used to display contributions and online documentation, and an increasing number of projects include an invitation to submit Email art digitally, either as the preferred channel or as an alternative to sending contributions by post. In 2006, Ramzi Turki received an e-mail containing a scanned work of Belgian artist Luc Fierens, so he sent this picture to about 7000 e-mail addresses artists seeking their interactions in order to acquire about 200 contributions and answers.

== See also ==
- Cyberculture
- Digital art
- Fax art
- Internet art
- Mail art
