= Fax art =

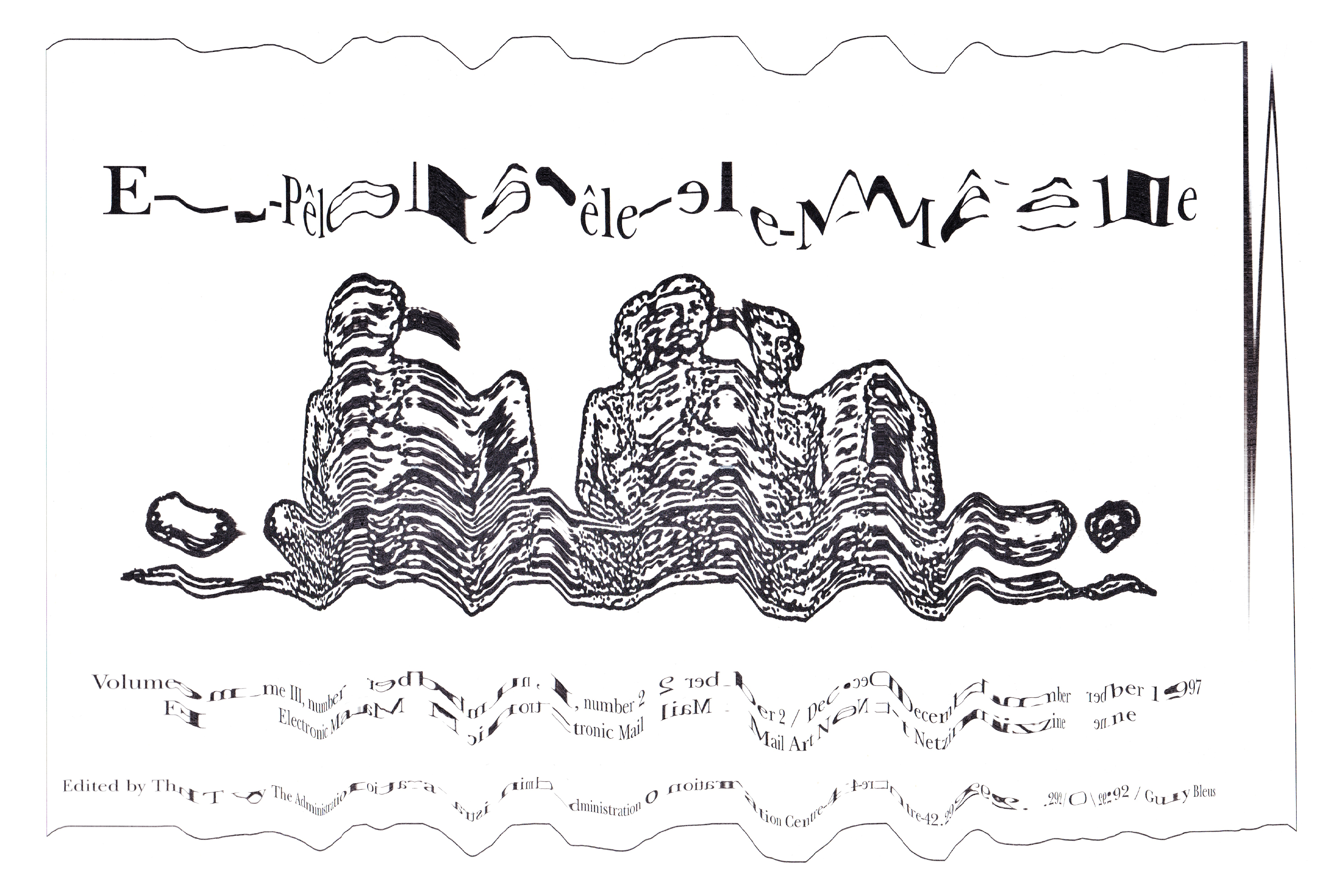
'E-Pêle-Mêle' ('Fax Art'), a 1997 piece of fax art by the Belgian artist Guy Bleus

Fax art is art specifically designed to be sent or transmitted by a facsimile machine, where the "fax art" is the received "fax". It is also called telecommunications art or telematic art. According to art historians Annmarie Chandler and Norie Neumark, "Fax art was another means of mediating distances".

In Brazil, the first artistic fax transmission was made between Paulo Bruscky in Recife and Roberto Sandoval in São Paulo on October 31, 1980; documentation of the transmission was exhibited at the Fundação Armando Alvares Penteado in 1985. On January 12, 1985, Joseph Beuys together with Andy Warhol and the Japanese artist Kaii Higashiyama participated in the "Global-Art-Fusion" project, a fax art project initiated by the conceptual artist Ueli Fuchser, in which a fax was sent with drawings of all three artists within 32 minutes around the world – from Düsseldorf (Germany) via New York (US) to Tokyo (Japan), received at Vienna's Palais Liechtenstein Museum of Modern Art. This fax was a statement of peace during the Cold War in the 1980s. The earliest scholarly note of fax art in art history was in 1990 by Karen O'Rourke.

== See also ==
- ASCII art
- Computer art
- Digital art
- Email art
- Interactive art
- Internet art
- Hank Magnuski
- New media art
- Systems art
- Telematic art
- Faxlore
