= Várnagy =

Várnagy is a surname. Notable people with the surname include:

- Shirley Varnagy (born 1982), Venezuelan journalist
- Tibor Várnagy (born 1957), Hungarian artist
- Tomás Várnagy (1950–2022), Argentine social scientist and philosopher
