= Carlo Pittore =

American painter (1943–2005)

- Born: Charles J. Stanley; 14 May 1943; Queens, New York
- Died: 17 July 2005 (aged 62)
- Education: School of the Museum of Fine Arts at Tufts, Chelsea College of Arts
- Known for: Painting, drawing
- Notable work: Boxer series, La Buffonera
- Movement: Mail Art
- Awards: Max Beckmann Scholarship, Honorary Doctorate of Fine Arts

Carlo Pittore (May 14, 1943 – July 17, 2005) born Charles J. Stanley was an American painter, educator, art activist, and publisher, whose primary study, teaching and body of work was figurative art and portrait painting. He was a pioneer in the Mail Art movement, and is noted for opening the first independent art gallery in the East Village, Manhattan. In 1987, Pittore founded "The Academy of Carlo Pittore" in Bowdoinham, Maine. He died of cancer in 2005.

== Early life ==
Pittore (née Charles Stanley) was born to Stanford and Estelle Stanley in Queens, New York. He grew up on Long Island, in Port Washington, New York with his sister Marion and brother Elliott.

== Early education ==
Pittore graduated from Port Washington High School (1961), where he was active in the political and debating scenes. He then went on to graduate from the School of the Museum of Fine Arts at Tufts (1966), and post graduate from the Brooklyn Museum Art School (1978).

Pittore changed his name in the 1970s while studying abroad in Rome, Italy. The children nicknamed him "Carlo Pittore", (”Charles the Painter"). From there he went on to study at the Chelsea College of Arts in London.

In 1978, Pittore received the Max Beckmann Scholarship in Advanced Painting. It allowed him to begin studying with American feminist painter Joan Semmel at the Brooklyn Museum Art School. He also studied with visual portrait artist Alice Neel. After which, he taught art at the New York Cultural Foundation.

== Career ==
In the 1970s, Pittore and his close friend Bern Porter published mail art under the stamp series “Post Me”, which he published through "Pittore Euforico, New York". Pittore also published such works as "Maine Moments in New York" (1979), "Colleagues" (1979), The Adventures of Carlo Pittore" (1979) and "Salva la Campagna Romana" (1982). Pittore illustrated the book ‘’Bern! Porter! Interview!’’ with original rubber and mail stamps.

Pittore opened “The Galleria dell ' Occhio” in 1980. It was the first independent art gallery in the East Village, New York City. Well known as a street level window art space open 24 hours a day, 7 days a week, it was during this time that Pittore met and became acquainted with artists such as Chuck Welch (a.k.a. the Cracker Jack Kid), Ray Johnson, and Keith Haring. Pittore painted Haring from life, a fact which Haring, a student at the School of Visual Arts at the time, mentions in his journals. Pittore's works have been shown in such places as Italy, Belgium, Tokyo, Chicago, New York (Museum Modern Art, Getty Institute for Art History & The Humanities, New York City Public Library), Los Angeles, Spain, Norway; and now hang in private collections throughout the world.

Due to the devastation caused by the outbreak of HIV/AIDS in the 1980s, Pittore left the lower East Side of Manhattan and moved to Maine permanently. In 1987 he founded "The Academy of Carlo Pittore" in Bowdoinham, Maine. Here he invited artists from all over to come and share their knowledge and talents in an academic forum; whilst he himself hosted drawing classes, painted and drew the artists (and models) and also cooked for them.

Pittore founded the “Union of Maine Visual Artists” in 1975. The UMVA passed into state law the “Maine Percent for Art Program” and the “Artist’s Estate Tax Law”. From 1978 to 1980, he was a council member for the "Comprehensive Employment Training Act Artists Project" in New York City.

Just before his death in 2005, the Maine College of Art awarded Pittore an honorary Doctorate of Fine Arts. The "Carlo Pittore Foundation for the Figurative Arts" was founded in 2006.

== Style ==
Pittore painted in the figurative and portraiture style; focusing mainly on the nude form of study. On account of this, critics and objectors occasionally viewed his work as "erotic" rather than objective art. Throughout his life, Pittore was extremely vocal toward such critics and what he perceived to be "ignorance" toward his art or art in general. He did not shy away from either voicing his opinion in letters to the editor or removing his exhibits from art galleries or public showings.

The colors red and green (symbols of the Italian flag) were two essential components in Pittore's work that defined his belief and understanding of complementary palette application. The contrast of these two color schemes arise time and again throughout his works; as can be seen in "Portrait of Blair Tily" (1987), "Opera - Self Portrait" (1981), "La Buffonera" (1983), and "Portrait of a Skeptic" (1996). Pittore's "Lincoln Portrait Series" was the only oil-on-canvas medium in which he worked without color. For this, he painted entirely in black and white due to the fact that the portraits were modeled after 19th-century photographs of Abraham Lincoln.
