= Bern Porter =

American artist, writer, publisher, performer, and physicist (1911–2004)

- Born: Bernard Harden Porter; February 14, 1911; Houlton, Maine (Porter Settlement)
- Died: June 7, 2004 (aged 93); Belfast, Maine
- Movement: Mail Art, Found Poetry

Bernard Harden Porter (February 14, 1911 – June 7, 2004) was an American artist, writer, publisher, performer, and physicist. He was a representative of the avant-garde art movements Mail Art and Found Poetry.

In 2010, his work was recognized by an exhibit at the Museum of Modern Art in New York.

== Biography ==
Bern Porter was born in Maine. His talent showed itself at Ricker Junior College, and he soon received a scholarship at the prestigious private Colby College in Waterville, Maine. His main subjects were physics, chemistry and economics. Porter then earned his master's degree at Brown University.

In 1935, Porter received a job with the Acheson Colloids Corporation in New York. He worked on the development of the coating of the television picture tube with a graphite mixture. In Paris around 1937-38 he was taken into the circle around Gertrude Stein. Porter read the manuscript of Henry Miller's Tropic of Cancer (novel). After the US entry into World War II he worked from 1940 as a soldier for the Manhattan Project in Princeton where he made the acquaintance of Albert Einstein. He worked there and in Oak Ridge, Tennessee, on creating methods for nuclear fission. He then worked at the University of California, Berkeley. His first marriage (1946) with the young student Helen Elaine Hendren failed after one year. As early as 1944 he was, even during his time at Manhattan Project in Tennessee, a pacifist, publishing an anonymous pamphlet by Henry Miller.

That same year, he came into close contact with Miller in Big Sur, while he worked on a Miller bibliography. Porter formed a small press, Bern Porter Books, which published texts by and about Henry Miller and poetry books by California poets. George Leite, a bookseller from San Francisco, published via Porter, the literary magazine Circle (10 issues, 1944–48) featuring Porter's views on the interplay of Art and Science he presented in his SciArt Manifesto (1950). Porter's parents arrived for a visit when Porter's father was arrested for fondling a 12-year-old girl, and Porter discovered that his father had a long history of molesting children in Maine. Refusing to see his father, Porter spent the next five years in Guam, working for the Guam Daily News and as a waiter and writing for an ad agency. During this time, Porter traveled in the South Pacific and meeting artists and writers and observing the rebirth of Hiroshima and Nagasaki in Japan. In 1955, upon his return to California, he married the anthropologist and writer Margaret Eudine Preston. They relocated to Burnie, Tasmania, where Porter worked for the Associated Pulp and Paper Mills, and later in Venezuela. In the 1960s, Porter was part of the Saturn V program at the NASA Marshall Space Flight Center in Huntsville, Alabama, until 1967). Margaret died in 1975.

Porter spent the next thirty years creating poetry, mail art, correspondence, travelling and hosting visitors at his Institute of Advanced Thinking in Belfast, Maine. He spent the last decades of his life living in Belfast, Maine.

== As artist ==
Porter is best known for his "founds", which he has published in numerous collections including Found Poems, The Wastemaker, The Book of Do's, Dieresis, Here Comes Everybody's Don't Book, and Sweet End. Publishers of these works included Something Else Press, The Village Print Shop, and Tilbury House.

Bern Porter's underground reputation as an artist-writer-philosopher-scientist is well established among visual artists and writers, and his philosophy of dissent is respected. Dick Higgins, the avant-garde writer and publisher/editor of the Something Else Press, was inspired to call Porter the Charles Ives of American letters'. Recognizing Porter as one of the earliest and most prolific practitioners of found poetry, Peter Frank (in his book on Something Else Press) has written: "Porter is to the poem what [Marcel] Duchamp was to the art object, a debunker of handiwork fetishism and exemplary artist-as-intercessor between phenomenon and receptor. He rejects the typical artist's role of semi-divine creator. Porter's eye never tires of seeking accidental, unconventional literature in odd pages of textbooks, far corners of advertisements, the verbiage of greeting cards and repair manuals, ad infinitum." In the late 1960s Porter's work was published in 0 to 9 magazine, an avant-garde journal that experimented with language and meaning-making.

Porter's career was complex and filled with contradictions. He was born in 1911, in Porter Settlement, Maine. All his life Porter had a love for literature, the visual arts and poetry in particular. As a child he created countless scrapbooks filled with collaged cut-outs of texts and images from newspapers. This process, used in the early scrapbooks, would later be developed into his technique of visual collaged poetry that he refers to as "Founds". As a pioneer author of artist's books, experiments in poetry, typography, and collage Porter published his first artist book in 1941. Since then he authored dozens of books and poetry broadsides as well as created paintings, sculpture, prints, and experimented with photography (included photograms in the early 1940s). He was also an early experimenter with alternative publishing, mail art, and performance poetry.

Late in his life a series of short books and pamphlets by Porter were published by Roger Jackson Publishers in Ann Arbor, including The World of Bern, a collaboration with Louise R. Roarty. He wrote a poem called The Last Acts of Saint Fuck You, which were presented in alphabetical order, with the same number of acts for each letter. He also did a recording of this that was full of reiterations. The Maine painter and mail artist, Carlo Pittore became a champion of Porter's work and created many works in homage to Porter including paintings, posters and artist postage stamps. Porter's thoughts on mail art were summed up in an interview with New York artist Mark Bloch in 1985.

“Lost and Found: The Work of Bern Porter from the Collection of The Museum of Modern Art Library” was on display through July 11, 2010 at MoMA in New York.

== As publisher ==
From 1944 to 1948, Porter and George Leite co-published a West Coast literary and artistic magazine called Circle.

In 1946 Porter published Kenneth Patchen's Panels for the Walls of Heaven, an edition of 750 copies. In addition, 150 copies were reserved as an edition of painted books, uniquely decorated, signed and numbered by Patchen.

Porter's imprint Bern Porter Books is best known for publishing the first editions of several works by Henry Miller.

Bern Porter Books published Miller's pacifist tract Murder the Murderers (1944) and sixteen other books by Miller, including The Plight of the Creative Artist in the United States of America (Bern Porter, Houlton, Me., 1944), Semblance of a Devoted Past (Bern Porter, Berkeley 1944), a book of watercolors, Echolalia (Bern Porter, Berkeley in 1945; at the same time in England), the Henry Miller Miscellania (Bern Porter, San Mateo, Calif, 1945), his Miller bibliography and Michael Fraenkel On the Genesis of the Tropic of Cancer (1946).

Porter designed Kenneth Patchen's Panels for the Walls of Heaven (Berkeley 1946); published the first books of the young Philip Lamantia (Erotic Poems; 1946), by Leonard Wolf : Hamadryad Hunted (1948); James Schevill (Tensions; 1947) and Robert Duncan : Heavenly City Earthly City (1947). For this purpose: Parker Tyler's The Granite Butterfly: A Poem in Nine Cantos (Berkeley 1945); Yvan Goll English Poems Fruit from Saturn, a response to Hiroshima and Nagasaki (1945; also in Hemispheres Editions, New York 1946); Hubert Creekmore: Formula (Berkeley 1947); Albert Cossery: Men God Forgot (1948).

From Guam Porter published the first book by James Erwin Schevill: The American Fantasies (Agana 1951). In the 1950s also appearing: poetry collections of Beat filmmaker Christopher Maclaine: The Crazy Bird (1951) and Word (1954); Gerd Stern: First Poems and Others (1952). Stern was a New Yorker friend Lamantia's, of his (first) wife. From the photographer Goldian (Gogo) Nesbit, the book Graffiti (1955) and two broadsides also appeared in 1955. Other authors of the series Bern Porter Broadsides were James Catnach, Kenneth Patchen, Mason Jordan Mason (Totem and Taboo) and Porter himself. From Schevill a poetry book The Right to Greet and Selected Poems (1959). From Kenneth Rexroth : A Bestiary for My Daughters Mary and Katherine (1955).

== As scientist ==
Prior to World War II, Porter contributed to the development of the cathode ray tube.

During World War II, Porter worked on the Manhattan Project. He worked in Oak Ridge, Tennessee, on the part of the project devoted to the separation of the highly enriched uranium needed to construct atomic bombs. After bombs were dropped on Hiroshima and Nagasaki, Porter regretted his involvement with the project and became an outspoken pacifist.

In the 1960s, Porter worked on NASA's Saturn V crewed rocket program.
