= Tibor Várnagy =

Hungarian fine artist and curator

Tibor Várnagy (Budapest, 25 April 1957) is known as a Hungarian fine artist, gallery director, curator and critic.

== Career ==
From the 1980s he has been a representative of the so-called alternative artistic endeavors. He also plays an active role in the experimental application of photography as fine art. In addition to this he draws, occasionally paints and creates collages or objects for different installations. Várnagy is a founding member of the Substitute Thirsters artist group and participated in their exhibitions between 1984 and 1990. From 1991 to 1994 he worked with Ágnes Eperjesi, and later organized occasional exhibitions with Gyula Várnai, Zoltán Ádám, Dezső Tandori, Andrea Hajagos. His activity has been characterized by experimentation and, since the 1990s, social sensitivity. He edited the (quasi) periodical Manapság between 2001 and 2004. An alternative version of this, Manamana was published on the occasion of the Service exhibition at Műcsarnok (Kunsthalle) Budapest. The critical, activist publication and project was edited and organised in association with Miklós Erhardt. Several artists took part in it (Dominik Hislop, Andreas Fogarasi, Róza El Hassan, Toma Sík etc. as well as numerous artworks were given to the publication by Gábor Bakos, Tibor Horváth, etc.). Várnagy has had a photoblog since 2006 and a video blog since 2009. As a critic and art writer, he deals with contemporary art and regularly publishes in the periodical Balkon and other art magazines.

Várnagy has been the director of the Liget Gallery in Budapest since its foundation in 1983. As a gallery director, curator and cultural organizer, he implements an exhibition program focusing on progressive experimental genres (performance, experimental photography, intermedia, new wave). It features innovative, interdisciplinary exhibitions and events other than the mainstream, including politically and socially radical activist works and projects. It is decisive both for his own curatorial activities and for the Liget Gallery as well that he has established direct collaborations and exhibition exchanges with foreign partners since the mid-1980s. This process was initiated by the II. Portfolio of Eastern European Artists project (curated by John P. Jacob, 1986) which has established long-term cooperation with the American curator in the form of exhibitions not only in Hungary and the US but also in Germany and China. There has been a continuous working relationship with the Mała Gallery in Warsaw, the Fotogalerie Wien and the Projektförderunk Bildende Kunst led by Monika Wucher and Christoph Rauch in Hamburg, as well as occasional collaborations with many artists, curators and institutions.

== Awards ==
1991–1994: Derkovits Art Scholarship; 1987: Studio Award (Substitute Thirsters); 1988: KISZ Award (Substitute Thirsters); Locus Signi – award of Laza Lapok (Loose Pages) for Liget Gallery, as a consistent representative of progressive and free thinking; 1993: Award of the Ministry of Culture and Education (with Ágnes Eperjesi); 1996: Award of Szép Magyar Könyv (Dezső Tandori: A semmi kéz, volume cover); 2000: For the cultural education of the district: Zugló / XIV. District Municipality (as director of the Liget Gallery); 2008: Award of the Municipality of Budapest at the Rig-Rigatar / Közelkép (Close-up) exhibition (Manamana project); 2010: Katalizátor-díj (Catalyst Award), Engine Category; 2017: Parallel Culture Award - Mediawave Festival

== Selected solo exhibitions ==
1985

H.Sz.2. Bercsényi Klub, Budapest

1986

A Helyettes Szomlyazók tudatfelszabadító hadműveletei/The Consciousness Liberation Operations of Substitute Thirsters - Komáromi Kisgaléria, Komárom

1987

A Hejettes Szomlyazók faliújságkiállítása David Thomas koncertjén (Exhibition of Substitute Thirsters at David Thomas’ concert), Pest Megyei Művelődési Központ (Pest County Cultural Centre), Szentendre

Fluxus, Hejettes Szomlyazók (Fluxus, Substitute Thirsters), GAMF, Kecskemét

1988

A váza (The Vase), Lágymányos Közösségi Ház (Lágymányos Community Centre), Budapest

1989

Strand (Hejettes Szomlyazók/Beach. Substitute Thirsters) - FMK (Young Artists' Club), Budapest

Frakciók (Hejettes Szomlyazók/Fractions, Substitute Thirsters), Stúdió Galéria

Stellvertretende Durstende, Künstlerhaus Bethanien, Berlin

Three Hungarian Photographers - István Halas, Zsuzsanna Ujj, Tibor Várnagy, Houston Center for Photography, Houston

Tibor Várnagy, Jennifer Sloan - Photographic Resource Center, Boston

Közös újabb képek (Hejettes Szomlyazók/ Common New Pictures, Substitute Thirsters), Szakmunkás Galéria, Miskolc

Spragnieni zastepcy (Hejettes Szomlyazók/ Substitute Thirsters), Galeria Wschodnia, Łódź

1990

Fotokoktél, Bercsényi Klub, Budapest

A Hejettes Szomlyazók szenvedélyes élete (Hejettes Szomlyazók)/The Passionate Life of Substitute Thirsters (Substitute Thirsters), István Király Múzeum, Székesfehérvár

Egy deci vörös (kétszer)/One glass of red wine (twice), FMK (Young Artists' Club), Budapest

Élni veszélyes/Living is dangerous (with Viktor Lois), Y Galéria, Uitz Terem, Dunaújváros

1992

Przeplatane zdjecia Tavate, Mała Galeria, Warsaw

Magvas kiállítás (with Ágnes Eperjesi), Stúdió Galéria, Budapest

Der Kern einer Austellung (with Ágnes Eperjesi), Künstlerhaus, Hamburg

1993

Con spirito (with Andreas Oldörp and Ágnes Eperjesi), Tűzoltó utca 72., Budapest

Padlópéldázatok II./Floor Parables II. - Tanulmányok a krétakörhöz /Studies for the Chulk Circle, Budapesti Tanítóképző Főiskola /Teacher Training College, Vizuális Tanszék/Visual Department (in the frames of SCCA Polifónia public art project), Budapest

1994

Padlópéldázatok III./Floor Parables III. - Békekoncert/Peace Concert (with Ágnes Eperjesi), Gallery by Night, Stúdió Galéria, Budapest

Sült képek és Mandala (with Ágnes Eperjesi) / Baked Pictures and Mandala, Szegedi Ifjúsági Ház, Szeged

1995

Előjelek és Kommentár/Omens and Commentary (with Ágnes Eperjesi), Goethe Institute, Budapest

1996

Örök Talaj - Padlópéldázatok IV./Eternal Soil - Floor Parables IV. (with Dezső Tandori), Gallery by Night, Stúdió Galéria, Budapest

1997

Lassan Változik/It is Slowly Changing (with Gyula Várnai), Bartók 32 Galéria, Budapest

A szegénység nem törvénytelen: EXISTENTIA /Poor is Not Illegal: EXISTENTIA, Bolt Galéria, Budapest

Slides, video-dokumente/Ausstellungen, Konzepte und Künstler aus Budapeste, Westwerk, Hamburg

1998

TAK, TAK, Mała Galeria, Warsaw

IGEN, IGEN: AMNÉZIA! Liget Galéria, Budapest

1999

Tiszta háború/faliújságprojekt/Clean War, Notice Board Exhibition, Liget Galéria, Budapest

2000

Ádám Zoltán és Várnagy Tibor kiállítása /Exhibition of Zoltán Ádám and Tibor Várnagy, Budapest Galéria Kiállítóterme /Budapest Gallery Exhibition Hall, Budapest

2002

Múlt Század /The Last Century, KKMK, Budapest

MANAfEST (with Miklós Erdardt) M-Mobil, Cipo Galeria, Műcsarnok (Kunsthalle), Budapest

2009

A part alatt (with Dezső Tandori and Andrea Hajagos), 2B Galéria, Budapest

2010

A part alatt (with Dezső Tandori and Andrea Hajagos), 2B Galéria, Budapest

2016

Tavate képei: Eperjesi Ágnes és Várnagy Tibor 1991–92-ben készült közös művei /Tavate's Pictures: Joint works of Ágnes Eperjesi and Tibor Várnagy between 1991-92, Inda Galéria, Budapest

2017

Rügyfakadás / A Hejettes Szomlyazók korai korszaka (1984–1987) /Budburst. The Early Period of Substitute Thirsters (1984–1987), Új Budapest Galéria /New Budapest Gallery

Hejettes Szomlyazók: A kopár szík sarja (1987–1992)/Substitute Thirsters: Sparse Alkali Flats (1987–1992), Ludwig Múzeum /Ludwig Museum, Budapest

2018

1989, Neon Galéria, Budapest

2019

Tévé, Tűz, Malevics/TV, Fire, Malevich, acb Attachment, Budapest

== Selected group exhibitions ==
1984

Helyettes hullám /Substitute Wave, Kisörspuszta

East European Exhibition, No Se No Gallery, New York

1986

Röviden - a Cseresorozat eseménysorozata /In Short- Events of Exchange Series, Galéria 11, Budapest

Láthatatlan művészet/Invisible Art, Kavics utca, Budapest

II. Nemzetközi Portfolio /2nd International Portfolio, Liget Galéria, Budapest

Stúdió '86, Budapesti Történeti Múzeum (Budapest History Museum), Budapest

1987

Out of East-Europe: Private Photography, List Visual Arts Center,

Grey Art Gallery

Salina Art Center, Salina, Kansas

Art Space, San Francisco, California

Painted Bride Art Center

Baxter Gallery, Portland

A mosónők korán aktok, Vajda Lajos Stúdió, Szentendre

...Meglepetés...olvasóink részére/...Surprise...for our readers, István Király Múzeum, Székesfehérvár

Deutsch - Ungarischer Künstlertreff, Kulturzentrum Hardtberg, Bonn

Stúdió'87, Ernst Múzeum

Węgierska Sztuka Młodych, Galeria Studio, Warsaw

1988

Új szerzemények/New Acquisitions, István Király Múzeum, Székesfehérvár

Węgierska Sztuka Młodych, Galeria PSEP, Wrocław

Junge Künstler der DDR und Ungarn, Neue Berliner Galerie, Berlin

Junge Ungarische Fotografen, Galerie Treptow, Berlin

Zeitgenössische Ungarische Fotografie, Fotogalerie Wien, Vienna

Dadaista képzőművészet a kortárs magyar művészetben, ELTE (Eötvös Lorand University), Budapest

VI. Esztergomi Fotóbiennálé/6th Photobiennial Esztergom, Rondella Galéria, Esztergom

Stúdió '88, Ernst Múzeum, Budapest

Zeitgenössische Fotografie aus Ungarn, Fotohof, Salzburg

1989

Fiatal képzőművészek az NDK-ból és Magyarországról/Young Artists from the GDR and Hungary, Ernst Múzeum, Budapest

Kék Acél/Blue Steel, Budapest Galéria Lajos utcai kiállítóterme/Budapest Gallery Exhibition Space at Lajos Street, Budapest

Szimmetria és aszimmetria/Symmetry and Asymmetry, Magyar Nemzeti Galéria (Hungarian National Gallery), Budapest

The Metamorphic Medium: New Photography from Hungary, Allen Memorial Art Museum, Oberlin

Más-kép, Ernst Múzeum, Budapest

Foto-modell, Szombathelyi Képtár, Szombathely

Stúdió '89, Ernst Múzeum, Budapest

Kék Iron, Duna Galéria, Budapest

1990

Kék-Vörös/Blue-Red, Uitz Terem, Dunaújváros

Inspiration : Sommer Atelier, Messe Gelende, Hannover

Hidden Story, Franklin Furnace, New York

A Negyedik - a FFS kiállítása/The Fourth-exhibition of the Young Photographers' Studio, Ernst Múzeum, Budapest

Arckép és önarckép/Portrait and Selfportrait, VII. Esztergomi Fotóbiennálé /7 Photobiennial Esztergom, Vármúzeum, Esztergom

Farbe Übertrag, East Side Gallery GDR, Berlin

Schnelle Bilder-Aktuelle Fotokunst im Gesprach, Künstlerhaus, Vienna

Fotoanarchiv - Nowa fotografia z Austrii i Węgier, Centrum Sztuki Współczesnej, Warsaw

Stúdió '90, Ernst Múzeum, Budapest

1991

Fotoanarchív II., Szombathelyi Képtár, Szombathely

New Spaces in Photography, Muzeum Architektury, Wrocław

Stúdió '91, Magyar Nemzeti Galéria (Hungarian National Gallery), Budapest

Eastern Academy of Photography - Workshop and exhibition, WUK, Vienna

1992

Aritmia/Arrythmia, Uitz Terem, Dunaújváros

Színezett fotográfiák/Coloured Photographs, VIII. Esztergomi Fotóbiennálé /8th Photobiennial Esztergom, Rondella Galéria, Esztergom

Derkovits ösztöndíjasok beszámoló kiállítása/ Reporting exhibition of the fine arts scholarship awardees, Műcsarnok (Kunsthalle), Budapest

Stúdió '92, Ernst Múzeum, Budapest

Analóg/Analogue, Budapest Galéria Lajos utcai kiállítóterme/Budapest Gallery Exhibition Space at Lajos Street, Budapest

1993

Derkovits ösztöndíjasok beszámoló kiállítása/Reporting exhibition of the fine arts scholarship awardees, Műcsarnok (Kunsthalle), Budapest

Variációk a Pop Art-ra - Fejezetek a magyar művészetből 1950–1990/variations on Pop art. Chapters in the history of Hungarian art between 1950 and 1990, Ernst Múzeum, Budapest

Zweite Zeitgenössische Ungarische Epigonen Ausstelllung, KX Kampnagel, Hamburg

1994

Nem egészen harmadik Kortárs Magyar Epigonkiállítás/Almost the Third Contemporary Hungarian Epigon Exhibition, Liget Galéria, Budapest

Újabb meglepetés olvasóink részére/Another Surprise for our Readers, Szent István Király Múzeum, Székesfehérvár

Alagút / Tunnel, Prágai Magyar Kulturális Intézet (Institute of Hungarian Culture in Prague), Prague

Balzsam / Ember embernek balzsama / Man/ Man is Man's Balm, Stúdió ’94, Ernst Múzeum, Budapest

Első kiállítás/First Exhibition, Bolt Galéria, Budapest

Csoportkép/Group Picture, Vigadó Galéria, Budapest

Derkovits ösztöndíjasok beszámoló kiállítása/Reporting exhibition of the fine arts scholarship awardees, Műcsarnok (Kunsthalle), Budapest

Budapest Art Expo / Pajta Galéria, BAE, Budapest

Fotogram/Photogram, IX. Esztergomi Fotóbiennálé / 9th Photobiennial Esztergom, Balassa Múzeum, Esztergom

Dobbin Books, HarperCollins Exhibition Space, New York

Foto-modell II., Uitz Terem, Dunaújváros

Derkovits ösztöndíjasok 1955–93/Derkovits awardees 1955–1993, Szombathelyi Képtár, Szombathely

1995

Gallery by Night (on the evenings of Eszter Babarczy, Katalin Tímár and Edit András), Stúdió Galéria, Budapest

Tájképek 1./Landscapes I., Budapest Galéria Lajos utcai kiállítóháza/Budapest Gallery Exhibition Space at Lajos Street, Budapest

Sarajevo, Ostromállapot/State of Siege, Műcsarnok (Kunsthalle), Budapest

Stúdió ‘95, Vigadó Galéria, Budapest

1996

Poszt a Posztban/Post in Post, Fészek Galéria, Budapest

Hímnem, nőnem/Feminine, Masculine, Bartók 32 Galéria, Budapest

Súcasná madarska fotografia / Month of Photography 1996, Umelecká Beseda Slovenska, Bratislava

Viszontlátásra! (Marcell Duchamp magyarországi hatásai)/Goodbye! (Marcel Duchamp's impact in Hungary), Budapest Galéria Lajos utcai kiállítóház/Budapest Gallery Exhibition Space at Lajos Street, Budapest

VIII. Országos Rajzbiennálé /8th Biennial of Graphic Arts, Salgótarján

Moving Modern, Barcsay Terem, Budapest

1997

Public Utility, Kombirama, Zürich

Páros, páratlan/even, Odd, Óbudai Pincegaléria, Budapest

Valigia in Hungary, Nyugati pályaudvar/Western Railway Station, Budapest

Feketemosogató/Potwasher, Kék Acél Étterem/Blue Steel Restaurant, Ózd

1998

Kép és Szöveg/Image and Text, Bolt Galéria, Budapest

Gallery by slides, Bartók 32 Galéria, Budapest

Zsebtévé/Pocket TV, C3, Budapest-Linz

1999

Pénzkiállítás és árverés/Money exhibition and Auction, Komédium Színház/Komédium Theatre, Budapest

Szubjektív / Fotó a Látványtárban 1./Subjective. Photo at Látványtár I., Első Magyar Látványtár, Diszel

KAMERA NÉLKÜL/NO KAMERA, Vintage Galéria, Budapest

2000

Millenium rizikó / Millenium Risk, Trafó Galéria, Budapest

Média Modell/interimédia-új képfajták-interaktív technikák/Media Modell. Intermedia-New Images, Interactive Techniques, Műcsarnok (Kunsthalle), Budapest

Időhíd 2000/Mesterek és tanítványok/Time bridge. Masters and Students, MűvészetMalom, Szentendre

Artsiders / K-vonal, Óbudai Társaskör és Pincegaléria, Budapest

Mimi nem felejt / az FKSE éves kiállítása /Mimi doesn't forget / Annual exhibition of Young Artists’ Studio, Trafó, Budapest

2001

Szerviz, Műcsarnok (Kunsthalle), Budapest

Szabad nap: 20 éves a Beszélő, Zrínyi Nyomda, Budapest

2002

Budapest Box: Rejtett szcéna a 90-es években/Budapest Boksz: Hidden Scene in the 1990s, Ludwig Múzeum/Ludwig Museum, Budapest

2004

Elhallgatott Holocaust / The Hidden Holocaust, Műcsarnok (Kunsthalle), Budapest

Waldsee 1944, Nemzetközi Levelezőlap Kiállítás/International Postcard Exhibition, 2B Galéria, Budapest

2005

Önarcképek/Selfportraits, 2B Galéria, Budapest

On Difference #2: Grenzwertig, Württembergischer Kunstverein, Stuttgart

2006

Szív-ügyek, MűvészetMalom, Szentendre

2007

Bartók bogarai/Bartók's Bugs, 2B Galéria, Budapest

2008

RIG-RIGATAR / KÖZELKÉP (Closeup), 2B Galéria, Budapest

2009

Emlékmű | Tolvaly Ernőre emlékezünk/Monument (Remembering Erdő Tolvaly), eMKá Galéria, Pécs

2011

Crosstalk Video Art Festival 2011, Gozsdu, B&C udvar, Budapest

Nehéz Ipar/Heavy Industry, ICA-D, Dunaújváros

2013

Konceptualizmus ma: Konceptuális művészet Magyarországon a kilencvenes évek elejétől /Conceptualism today – Conceptualist art in Hungary from the beginning of the 1990s, Paksi Képtár, Paks

Malevics visszanéz/Malevich Looks Back, MAMŰ Galéria, Budapest

2014

Átrendezett valóság: Alkotói stratégiák a magyar művészetben a dada és a szürrealizmus vonzásában, a Dada és szürrealizmus című kiállítás keretében (a Hejettes Szomjazókkal) / In the frames of the exhibition Rearranged Reality: Creative Strategies in Hungarian art under the spell of dada and Surrealism (accompanying exhibition of Dada and Surrealism- Magritte, Duchamp, man Ray, Miró, Dali), with Substitute Thirsters, Magyar Nemzeti Galéria (Hungarian National Gallery), Budapest

Bőrödön viseled: Társadalmi konstrukciók vizuális kódjai/Second Skin. Visual Codes of Social Constructions, Robert Capa Kortárs Fotográfiai Központ, Budapest

Forradalom. Anarchia. Utópia (a Hejettes Szomjazókkal) /Anarchy. Utopia. Revolution (with Substitute Thirsters), Ludwig Múzeum, Budapest

2017

Gazdálkodj okosan! A művészet és a gazdaság kapcsolatáról /Economize! On the Relationship of Art and Economy, Ludwig Múzeum, Budapest

Látkép – Az elmúlt félévszázad magyar fotográfiája 1967-2017/ Viewfinders-Hungarian Photography from the past half century 1967-2017, Robert Capa Kortárs Fotográfiai Központ/Robert Capa Contemporary Photography Center, Budapest

2018

Promote, Tolerate, Ban: Art and Culture in Cold War Hungary, Wende Museum, Culver City, California

A Zóna / A művész művésze/The Zone. The Artist's Artist, Inda Galéria, Budapest

2019

Ajándék/Gift, Budapest Galéria Lajos utcai Kiállítóháza /Budapest Gallery, Budapest

A fotográfia anatómiája/Anatomy of Photography, Rómer Flóris Művészeti és Történeti Múzeum /Rómer Flóris Art and History Museum, Győr

== Works in public collections ==
Artpool, Budapest

Első Magyar Látványtár (First Hungarian Spectacle Collection), Diszel

Getty Research Institute, Los Angeles

The John P. Jacob / Riding Beggar Press Collection at the Beinecke Rare Bookand Manuscript Library, Yale University, New Haven

2B Galéria, Budapest

Kiscelli Múzeum, Budapest

Ludwig Múzeum, Budapest

Magyar Fotográfiai Múzeum (Hungarian Photography Museum), Kecskemét

Magyar Nemzeti Galéria (Hungarian National Gallery), Budapest

Mała Galeria, Warsaw

Modern Művészetért Alapítvány (Foundation for Modern Arts), Dunaújváros

Obala Art Center, Sarajevo, Bosnia-Herzegovina

Szent István Király Múzeum (King St. Stephen's Museum), Székesfehérvár

Galeria Wymiany, Łódź

== Texts (selection) ==
- Tibor Várnagy: Fireprints - Exhibition of/ Milan Knížák kiállítása, Foto 34/7. July 1987.
- Tibor Várnagy: Brief - Eigentor - European Photography No 35, Göttingen, 1988.
- Tibor Várnagy: Vorvort - Bilder 38, WUK 1988, Vienna
- Tibor Várnagy: A Beethoven-gang és valami kék - Michaela Moscouw kiállításáról (On the exhibition of Michaela Moscouw), Foto 35/5.1988.
- Tibor Várnagy: Robert Frank: Moving Out, Balkon, 1994/12.
- Tibor Várnagy: Faltörténetek/Wandgeschichten - C.Rauch és/ und Menesi A. megosztanak egy teret/teilen sich einen Raum; PBK, Hamburg 1996.
- Tibor Várnagy: NEWYORKCAFE - N.Y.C. 1996 November - Balkon, 1997/3.
- Tibor Várnagy: Punkt, Loch, Platz, Space (Point, hole, Place, Space/Pont, Lyuk, Tér, Hely) - Chimaera, Staatliche Galerie, Moritzburg Halle, 1997.
- Tibor Várnagy: Kávéfoltok az A-broschról - a Fotogalerie Wien bemutatkozása a Mai Manó Házban (The introduction of Fotogalerie Wien at the Hungarian House of Photography) - Balkon, 2000/9.
- Tibor Várnagy: Women art a felkelő nap országából /Women Art from the Country of the Rising Sun - Magyar Narancs, 14/12/2000.
- (articles:Tandori Dezső, Ujj Zsuzsanna, Contemporary Hungarian Art Encyclopedia, Enciklopedia)
- Tibor Várnagy: Bevezetés – Lucrezia De Domizio Durini: A fillckalap / Joseph Beuys /Egy elmesélt élet- Kijárat Kiadó, Budapest, 2001
- Várnagy Tibor: Joseph Beuys magyarul/Joseph Beuys in Hungarian – Élet és Irodalom, 5/10/2001.
- Tibbi Várnagy: Am Hof: Bécs, August 2001 – Balkon, November 2001.
- Tibbi Várnagy: Hallo, szervusztok: Prince January/Terra Forming – Balkon, January/February 2002.
- Tibbi Várnagy: Magánhő: feLugossy László a Miskolci Galériában (Private Heat: László feLugossy at Miskolci Gallery) – Új Holnap, spring 2002; whole version in László feLugossy: Távolság (Válogatás 1978 –2002) /Distance (Selection 1978–2002), private publishing 2002.
- Tibbi Várnagy: A könyvheti: Paul Auster /Timbuktu - Balkon, June 2002.
- Várnagy TBB: Láthatatlan történet (Invisible Story) - megjelent a Szamizdat: Alternatív kultúrák Kelet-és Közép-Európában 1956–1989 című kiállítás katalógusában (published in the catalogue of the Samizdat:Alternative Cultures in Eastern and Central Europe 1956–1989), Stencil Kiadó - Európai Kulturális Aalapítvány, Budapest 2004.
- Tibor Várnagy: Konceptuális.doc (Conceptual.doc) – Praesens, 2004/1.
- Tibor Várnagy-Kata Balázs: Magunk vagyunk a fontosak, különben az egésznek nincs értelme. Rhea Thönges-Stringaris-szal Balázs Kata és Várnagy Tibor beszélget /We are the important ones, otherwise it has no sense at all. Conversation with Rhea Thönges-Stringaris by Kata Balázs and Tibor Várnagy, Balkon, 2018/1.

== Catalogues, books ==
Helyettes Szomjazók (Substitute Thirsters)- Stúdió Galéria, Budapest, 1988.

Tibor Várnagy: A váza (The Vase) - Lágymányosi Közösségi Ház (Lágymányos Community Centre), Budapest, 1987.

A Hejettes Szomjazók Szenvedélyes Élete (The Passionate Life of the Substitute Thirsters)- Az István Király Múzeum Közleményei, D. series 197., May 1990. Székesfehérvár

Hidden Story (with John P. Jacob) Franklin Furnace, New York, 1990.

Blinde Passagiere / Potyautasok - Künstlerhaus Bethanien, Berlin, 1990.

Ágnes Eperjesi - Tibor Várnagy: Przeplatane Zdjecia Tavate, Mała Galeria, ZPAF, Warsaw, 1992.

Eperjesi - Várnagy: Egy Könyv / Ein Buch - PBK, Stúdió Galéria, Künstlerhaus Hamburg, 1993.

Eperjesi - Várnagy: Előjelek / Omens - MNKA, Goethe Institute, Pelikán Kiadó Budapest, 1995.

EXISTENTIA, Bolt Galéria, 1997.

Várnai-Várnagy: Lassan Változik /It is slowly changing, Bartók 32 Galéria, 1998.

Manapság – on the occasion of the exhibition of Zoltán Ádám and Tibor Várnagy, Budapest Galéria, 2000.

Manamana (Manapság 2, 3) – in the frames of Szerviz /Service, Műcsarnok/Kunsthalle, August/September 2001.

Manamana (Manapság 4) – in the frames of the Budapest Box exhibition, Ludwig Museum, aug. 2002.

Manamana (Manapság 5) – in the frames of M-Mobil, Műcsarnok, September 2002.

Sustainable Development 2018/3 - Hejettes Szomjazók / Substitute Thiersters: Burgyingo, acb ResearchLab, Budapest, 2018.

Tibor Várnagy - Fényképek kamera nélkül 1985–1993 (Cameraless Photography 1985–1993). ed. Fenyvesi Áron, Várnagy Tibor. 2019, acb RESEARCHLAB (texts by John P. Jacob and Kata Balázs)

== Essays, studies on Tibor Várnagy, the Substitute Thirsters, the Eperjesi-Várnagy collaboration (selection) ==
István Antal: A rontás virágai - V.T. képeiről, Foto 34/11., November 1987.

Kata Balázs: Rekonstrukció és önirónia / Rügyfakadás A Hejettes Szomlyazók korai korszaka (1984–1987) (Reconstruction and Self-Irony. Budburst. The Early Period of Substitute Thirsters (1984–1987)- Balkon, 2017/5.

Kata Balázs: Csodavárás / Várnagy Tibor: 1989 (Waiting for a Miracle. Tibor Várnagy: 1989) - Balkon, 2018/5.

Kata Balázs: Beszélgetés Várnagy Tibor képzőművésszel I. (Conversation with Tibor Várnagy I.), Balkon, 2019/3.

Kata Balázs: Beszélgetés Várnagy Tibor képzőművésszel II. (Conversation with Tibor Várnagy II.), Balkon, 2019/5.

László Bihari: Protokolláris vagy kortárs művészet? - Beszélgetés Várnagy Tiborral (Protocol or Contemporary Art? Conversation with Tibor Várnagy), Magyar Hírlap, 2/10/1999.

Andrea Bordács: A nemek harca az igennel - Új Művészet, 1996/11.

Géza Boros: Hejettem Szomlyazók - Új Művészet, 1990/1.

László Darvasi: Sült képek és mandalák, Délmagyarország, 13/05/1994.

Csillag Deák –Lajos Kölüs: Egy triangulum hangjai - Új Művészet, 2014/11.

EWA: Niech zyje! - Gazeta Wyborcza, 8 kwietnia 1998.

Viola Farkas: Várnagy Tibor munkáihoz (For the Works of Tibor Várnagy) - Élet és Irodalom, 4 March 2016

G.A: Helyszínelés - A H.Sz. Szenvedélyes élete, Film, Színház, Muzsika, 34/38. September 1990.

Júliusz Húth: Helyettes nyolcvanas évek - Artportal, 2017.

Éva Ibos: Vértelen forradalom/Bloodless Revolution (Anarchia. Utópia. Forradalom. / Ludwig Múzeum /Anarchy, Utopia. Revolution, Ludwig Museum) - Revizor, 04/12/2014.

Katalin Izinger - Ferenc Czinki: Átrendezett Segesvár - szikmblog, 2014.

John P. Jacob: The Enigma of Meaning: Transforming Reality in Hungarian Photography – The Metamorphic Medium: New Photography from Hungary – The Allen Memorial Art Museum of Oberlin College, Oberlin (Ohio), 1989.

John P. Jacob: Recalling Hajas / Nightmare Works: Tibor Hajas – Anderson Gallery, Virginia Commonwealth University, Library of Congress Catalogue Card Number: 90-83304, 1990.

Judit Jankó: Egyszerűen éltünk a szabadságban (Ágnes Eperjesi, Tibor Várnagy) - Artportal, 2016.

Judit Jankó: Ki szomjazik, és mit helyettesít? (Beszélgetés Várnagy Tiborral) (Who is Thirsty and what does he substitute? Conversation with Tibor Várnagy)- Új Művészet, 2017/8.

Kangiszer Dóra: Az intézményesülés formáitól tartózkodni igyekeznek (HSZ tudatfelszabadító hadműveletek) - Tranzitblog, 2017.

Elfi Kreis: Trauergelant und Nonsensgebimmel, Der Tagesspiegel, 23/05/1989, Berlin

Emese Kürti: Kicsit elveszett (Nehéz Ipar) /A Little Lost (Heavy Industry) - Magyar Narancs, 2011.

József Ladányi: Anya(g / + mater(ia, A Helyettes Szomjazók szenvedélyes élete, Az István Király Múzeum Közleményei, D. series, 197., May 1990.

Fanni Magyar: Hülye, aki elolvassa (Beszélgetés a Hejettes Szomlyazókkal) - Műértő, July–August 2017.

József Mélyi: Zseniális dilletánsok (Hejettes Szomlyazók) - Magyar Narancs, 2017/31.

Zsolt Mészáros: Kopár szík - Artkartell, 2017.

(m-i): Helyettem Szomjazók, Hitel, 3/10, May 1990.

(nagy): Egy út van előttem, melyiken induljak - Motolla, 1989/2, München

Lu Nanxi: Substitute Thirsters- Art World #329 issue 2017 July

Gergely Nagy: Klímaszervíz / esemény és hatás között: beszélgetés VT-ral – Műértő, October 2001.

Ernő P. Szabó: Tudat-felszabadító hadműveletek (A Hejettes Szomlyazók kiállításai) - Új Művészet, 2017/8.

Gábor Rieder: Rügyfakadás - Artkartell, 2017.

Mihály Simon: Összehasonlító magyar fotótörténet, Magyar Fotográfiai Múzeum (Hungarian Museum of Photography), Kecskemét

Hajo Schiff: Gulasch mit Himbeeren - Eine Ausstellung des Ungarischen Duos Agnes Eperjesi und Tibor Várnagy, TAZ HAMBURG, 7.10.92

Szilvia Seres: „Őrülten ment előre a technika, amit nagyon lehetett élvezni.” - Digitkult, 2017.

Tibbi a Ligetben (Várnagy Tiborral beszélget Seres Szilvia) - Balkon, 2006/7-8.

János Sturcz: A heroikus ego lebontása - Magyar Képzőművészeti Egyetem

Renáta Szikra – Tünde Topor: A duchamp-i hagyomány újra és újra inspirálóvá válik - Artmagazin 2014/7.

Ádám Tábor: A rendszerváltás kori budapesti dadaisták („A kopár szik sarja” – A Hejettes Szomlyazók kiállítása a Ludwigban) - Litera, 2017.

Erzsébet Tatai: Bódhi fa nincsen, lélek nem tükör. Ha semmi sincsen, honnan lenne por? – Manapság, Budapest Galéria, 2000.

Erzsébet Tatai: Tárlatvezető / Ember Állatkert – Manapság – Róma 2000 – Műértő, September 2000.

Erzsébet Tatai: Neokonceptuális művészet Magyarországon a kilencvenes években - Praesens, Budapest, 2005.

Bela Ugrin: Independent Visions - Three Hungarian Photographer, SPOT, 1990/10.

Csilla Urbán: A művész egy lusta értelmiségi vagy állandó vendégmunkás? - Népszava, 16 October 2017.

Tamás Vajna: Ha a művészek beszüntetnék az alkotást, azt a világgazdaság is megérezné - Qubit, 2017.

Monika Wucher: Der Kern einer Ausstellung - Nappali Ház, 1993/1.

Monika Wucher: Magvas kiállítás - Eperjesi Ágnes és Várnagy Tibor munkái, Új Művészet, 1993/1.

Thomas Wulffen: Stellvertretende Durstende, Kunstforum International, 1989/5.

Focus: Public Art in Hungary (edited and compiled by Hedvig Turai), interviews by Erzsébet Tatai, artmargins. com 2003.

A Szerk.: A Hejettes Szomlyazók helyetted is szomjaznak - Librarius, 07/08/2017

== Online sources, external links ==
Varnagy(last accessed: 28 October 2019)

curatorcv(last accessed: 28 October 2019)

Várnagy Tibor (last accessed: 28 October 2019)

(last accessed: 28 October 2019)

46A(last accessed: 28 October 2019)

Tibor Várnagy (last accessed: 28 October 2019)

Substitute Thirsters (Hejettes Szomlyazók) (last accessed: 28 October 2019)
