= Judith Hoffberg =

American art curator

Judith Ann Hoffberg
- Born: May 19, 1934
- Died: January 16, 2009 (aged 74); Santa Monica, California, USA
- Education: University of California, Los Angeles
- Occupation: Librarian

Judith Hoffberg (May 19, 1934 – January 16, 2009) was a librarian, archivist, lecturer, curator and art writer, and editor and publisher of Umbrella, a newsletter on artist's books, mail art, and Fluxus art. Hoffberg was a major influence on the introduction of books as an artists' medium.

== Biography ==
Hoffberg received a B.A. in Political Science from the University of California in 1956. She went on to get an M.A. in Italian Language and Literature in 1960 and an M.L.S. from the UCLA School of Library Service in June 1964.

She was a Special Intern at the Library of Congress after serving as a cataloguer in 1964–65 at the Johns Hopkins University Bologna Center in Italy. At the Library of Congress, she was a cataloguer in the Prints & Photographs Division until 1967, when she served as the Fine Arts Librarian at the University of Pennsylvania from 1967 to 1969. She went on to UCSD from 1969 to 1971 as art, literature and language bibliographer and to the Brand Library in Glendale, CA as Director from 1971 to 1973. From 1974 to 1976, she worked for the Smithsonian Institution as Archivist and Editorial Assistant for the Bicentennial Bibliography of American Arts.

In 1972, Hoffberg co-founded Art Libraries Society of North America (ARLIS) and added a new region to the collective. She served as the Society's first chairman, editor of ARLIS/NA Newsletter from 1972 to 1977 and its Executive Secretary from 1974 to 1977. Hoffberg’s motivation for establishing the Art Libraries Society of North America (ARLIS/NA) was because of the lack of community amongst art libraries and art librarians in the United States. As the definition and collection of art progressed, art librarians were mutually struggling with the task of cataloguing new items such as artist’s books, postcards, and other ephemeral art. After traveling to the United Kingdom, Hoffberg had learned from the original chapter of the Art Libraries Society on how to build community and networks between art libraries. As editor of the ARLIS/NA Newsletter, it was important for Hoffberg to include the latest in art librarianship, technology, trends, and provided networking opportunities. Librarian interviews, reviews, and cataloging methods were also included in the ARLIS/NA Newsletter.

In 1977, Hoffberg resigned from her position as Executive Secretary and editor of the ARLIS/NA Newsletter. A brief reasoning disagreements about funding was given when she did leave the position. Despite her resignation, Hoffberg continued to earn the first ever ARLIS lifetime membership. ARLIS/NA is also now the largest art library association in the world.

In 1978, Hoffberg founded Umbrella Associates. Her work included consulting with archives and libraries. She edited and published Umbrella, a newsletter about artists' books and publications. In her work as a writer, editor, and curator, she enthusiastically championed Fluxus, inexpensive artists' books, mail art, rubber-stamp art, and many other offbeat forms of expression of the second half of the 20th century. Hoffberg also lectured widely throughout the US and abroad. Her collection of artist/s books is split between the University of California at Los Angeles and the UCSB; her collection of some 15,000 pieces of Umbrelliana is at the UCSD, in La Jolla. Umbrella was printed until 2005 and was then transitioned to being available solely online in 2006.

In 2000, Hoffberg and Béatrice Coron founded the International Edible Book Festival. By 2006, the International Edible Book Festival was hosted in twenty-six states and fifteen countries.

Hoffberg was diagnosed with acute myeloid leukemia in 2008 and died of lymphoma the following year.

== Grants and awards ==
- National Endowment for the Arts, Service to the Field, 1980, 1981
- Australia & New Zealand Arts Council grants, lecture tour, 1982
- Dutch Government Research Trant, 1982
- British Council Grant, 1983
- Fulbright Research & Lecture Grant, 1984, (in New Zealand to work on Len Lye's archives)
- Fluxus Research Fellow, Sonja Henie & Niels Onstad Foundation, Oslo, Norway

== Curatorial activities ==
- Artwords & Bookworks, (LAICA), Los Angeles, which traveled to Herron School of Art (Indianapolis) Contemporary Art Center (New Orleans), Franklin Furnace (New York), Australia & New Zealand (1978–79), co-curator: Joan Hugo
- Book Exhibition, University of Massachusetts Amherst, 1978
- The Umbrella Show, University of California, Riverside, 1979
- Art & Society: Bookworks by Women, Beyond Baroque, Venice, CA, 1981
- Ex Libris, Bookworks by Artists, Traction Gallery, Los Angeles, CA, 1981
- Some Important Announcements, Santa Monica Public Library for the Santa Monica Arts Commission, 1985
- Editions & Additions: International Bookworks, Idea, Sacramento, CA, Northlight Gallery, Tempe, AZ, and UC Riverside, March 1986
- Undercover: The Book as Format, Fresno Arts Center, 1987
- Art from the Page: Bookworks, Salem Art Association, Bush Barn, Salem, Oregon and Texas Woman's University, Denton, TX, 1987
- A Book of His Own: Men’s Visual Diaries, Woodland Pattern Book Center, Milwaukee, WI, 1987
- A Book in Hand, Arvada Center for the Arts & Humanities, Arvada, CO, 1989
- A Book of His Own: Man’s Visual Diaries, UCLA Art Library, 1990
- Cross <+> Currents: Books from the Edge of the Pacific, travelling artists' books exhibition beginning in California and travelling 1991–1993 to UCSB, Cal State Hayward, Ringling School of Art and Design, Oregon School of Arts & Crafts
- Boundless Vision: Contemporary Bookworks, San Antonio Art Institute, 1991
- Freedom: International Mail Art Show, Armory for the Arts, Pasadena, CA, 1992
- The Amazing Decade: Women and Performance Art in America, 1970-1980, New Gallery, Santa Monica, CA, 1993
- Shaped Structures: Bookworks in Form, Palos Verdes Art Center, Palos Verdes, CA, 1993
- Multiple World: An International Survey of Artists’ Books, co-curated by Peter Frank, at Atlanta College of Art, Atlanta, GA, 1994
- John O’ Brien: Passe-partout: A Revised Study, New Gallery, Santa Monica, 1994
- Barbara Turner Smith: Who are We?..Hirokazu Kosaka: Woman with Mole, New Gallery, Santa Monica, CA, 1994
- Journey/Journals: Elsa Flores & Gronk, New Gallery, Santa Monica, CA, 1994
- Boundless: Liberating the Book Form, San Francisco Center for the Book, 1998
- Women of the Book: Jewish Artists, Jewish Themes, travelling exhibition which opened in Finegood Art Gallery in 1997–1998 and has traveled to Kutztown, University of Pennsylvania, Florida Atlantic University, Brattleboro Art Museum, JCC of Minneapolis/Minnesota Center for Book Arts, Chicago, IL, La Jolla, CA and the La Sierra University, Riverside, CA, Missouri State University, Springfield, Missouri, and Rutgers University, Camden, NJ.
- "Six Degrees: Art in the Libraries," sponsored by Side St. Projects, Pasadena, CA, co-curated by Karen Atkinson and Sam Erenberg, 2001

== Publications ==
- Co-Editor, Directory of Art Libraries & Visual Resource Collections in North America (New York, Neal Schuman, 1978)
- "Bibliography of Women Artists’ Books", Chrysalis (Spring 1978)
- "Artists’ Books" in Art & Technology: The History & Method of Fine Papermaking (San Francisco, World Print Council, 1979)
- Editor & Publisher, Artists’ Publications in Print, 1980–83
- "Art Book Column" in High Performance Magazine, 1984–1994
- "Distribution and its Discontents" in Art Papers (Atlanta) May–June 1990
- Publisher, Cross<+>Currents: Books from the Edge of the Pacific (Pasadena, Umbrella Associates, 1992)
- "Learning to Read Art: The Art of Artists’ Books," The New Bookbinder, vol. 13, 1993
- Publisher, The Book Maker’s Desire: Writings on the Art of the Book by Buzz Spector (Pasadena, Umbrella Editions, 1995)
- Publisher, Umbrella: The Anthology (Santa Monica, Umbrella Editions, 2000)
- Editor and author, Women of the Book: Jewish Artists, Jewish Themes (Boca Raton, Friends of the Library, 2001)
