= Umbrella (newsletter) =

Umbrella was an art newsletter or informal magazine that ran for three decades, from 1978 to 2008. Its focus was on artist's books and related media, and it has been credited as an important factor in the emergence and visibility of artist's books from Southern California.

== History ==
Umbrella was founded by curator Judith Hoffberg in 1978, and she remained its editor for the duration of its existence. Appearing irregularly, between 2 and 6 times a year, Umbrella focused on artist's books and related printed matter such as mail art, Xerox art, and photobooks. Hoffberg had a particular interest in Fluxus art and artist's books that took a semi-sculptural form. The newsletter regularly featured profiles of artists, exhibition reviews, book reviews, and general news about the art world.

During the spring of 1996 there was a retrospective of all Umbrella newsletters (1978-1996) in Guy Bleus' E-Mail Art Archives in the provincial Centre for Arts (now Art Museum Z33) in Hasselt, Belgium.

Umbrella was published in black-and-white until 2002, after which its covers were in color. It ceased print publication in 2005, after which it had an online edition until 2008. The journal ended publication altogether when Hoffberg fell ill in 2008; she died the following year. The entire print run of the magazine has been digitized by the Herron School of Art and Design and is available free online.
