= Karen O'Rourke =

Karen O'Rourke is an artist and Emeritus Professor at Jean Monnet University in Saint-Etienne. Her personal work tends to relate artistic practice to the notions of network, archiving and territory. She has published numerous articles in journals (Leonardo, Livraison, Aperture, La revue du Cube, AI & Society, Figures de l'art, Plastik, etc.) and collective works (Art-Réseaux, Territoires, Art++). She is the author of two works of synthesis; Walking and Mapping: Artists as Cartographers (MIT Press, 2013) and From arts-networks to programmed drifts: the relevance today of “art as experience”.

== Selected publications ==
Books

O'Rourke, Karen (2016-02-12). Walking and Mapping. MIT Press. ISBN 978-0-262-52895-5.

Artworks and Exhibition catalogues

Art-Réseaux, Paris, Les Éditions du CERAP, 1992.

Paris Réseau/Network bilingual CD-Rom, Paris, Les Éditions du CERAP, 2000.

L’Archivage comme activité artistique/Archiving As Art, Paris, Archives de la création, 2000.

Territoires (dir.), catalogue d’exposition, Galerie Michel Journiac, du 16 au 30 juin 2011, Paris, APESA, Université Paris 1, 2013

Articles published in books

“City Portraits ou l’interprétation des images”, Art-Réseaux (dir. K. O’Rourke). Paris, éd. du CERAP, 1992, 42-51.

“Art, media and telematic space” (“Die Kunst, die Medien und der Telematische Raum”), Teleskulptur, Entgrenzte Grenzen 2 (ed. Richard Kriesche) Kulturdata, Graz, Autriche, 1993, 88-98.

“Art, réseaux, télécommunications”, Mutations de l’image : Art Cinéma/ Vidéo/ Ordinateur (eds. Maria Klonaris et Katerina Thomadaki) Paris, Astarti, 1994, pp. 52–57.

“A Map Larger than the Territory“, Acoustic Space Reader : Trans-Cultural Mapping Acoustic Space, RIXC, Riga, Latvia, 2004

"Dérives programmées [promenades assistées par ordinateur]," Art++, (ed. David-Olivier Lartigaud). Orléans, Editions HYX, 2011.

"Entretien avec Wilfried Hou Je Bek » and « Entretien avec Jo Walsh », Art++, (ed. David-Olivier Lartigaud). Orléans, Editions HYX, 2011.

"Cart’Expé : expérimentations et cartographies pluridisciplinaires" (co-author : Thierry Joliveau), in Vincent Ciciliato, dir., Collecter, cataloguer, cartographier, Publications Universitaires de Saint-Etienne, 2020.

"Vivre en anarchive : entretien avec Anne-Marie Duguet" in Vincent Ciciliato, dir., Collecter, cataloguer, cartographier Publications Universitaires de Saint-Etienne, 2020.

Articles published in referee journals

“The Artist’s Book and Photography: the Example of Michael Snow’s Cover to Cover”, la Revue Française d’Etudes Américaines, N°8, 1979

“Notes on ‘Fax-Art'”, New Observations N° 76 (New York, mai/juin 1990), pp. 24–25. Republished in Hungarian and English Árnyékkötők Co-Media, Budapest, N° 19, pp. 47–52.

“City Portraits: an Experience in the Interactive Transmission of Imagination”, Leonardo (Journal of the International Society for the Arts, Sciences and Technology), vol. 24, N° 2, 1991.

“Paris Réseau”, Epiphaneia, N°1 (Recherches en esthétique et technologie), pp. 42–43, Naples, Italie, 1995.

“Paris Réseau: Paris Network”, Leonardo : Journal of the International Society for the Arts, Sciences and Technology, Vol. 29, N° 1(M.I.T. Press, Cambridge, Mass.,), 1996, pp. 51–57.

“Arte e Comunicação, Arte de Redes: Práticas e Problemáticas”, Cadernos Pós Graduação, Ano 2, vol.2, n°2, Instituo de Artes, Campinas, Brésil, 1998, pp 9–17.

“L’archivage comme pratique artistique“, Archives de la Création (sous la direction de Costin Miereanu et Michel Blay) Rapport du CNRS, 1999.

“Paris Réseau, Paris Network”, AI & Society: the Journal of Human-Centred Systems and Machine Intelligence vol.14, n°2, numéro spécial consacré à l’esthétique des bases de données, 2000, pp. 214–222.

“Trajectoires et perspectives des bases de données: la représentation en ligne de l’expérience spatio-temporelle” (co-author: S. Daniel), Actes du colloque Artmedia 8: de l’Esthétique de la communication au net art, Ligeia, Paris, 2003

“Bases de données : Trajectoires et perspectives” (co-author S. Daniel), Plastik N° 3, automne 2003, CERAP/Université Paris 1, Paris, Publications de la Sorbonne, pp. 169–176.

“Une carte plus grande que le territoire”, Livraison N°4, Rhinocéros, Strasbourg, 2004.

“[Mapping the Database] Trajectories and perspectives“(co-author: Sharon Daniel), in Leonardo, Volume 37, Issue 4 (Aug. 2004)

"Ruines à l’envers", Les IrrAIductibles, Espaces de jeu et enjeux dans l’art, Université Paris 8, N° 8, 2005, pp. 353–371.

"Art Work/ Dream Work in New Media Documentary", Leonardo Electronic Almanach (From New Media to Old Utopias: ‘Red’ Art in Data Capitalism) 2014.

"Stratégies d’adaptation pour l’Anthropocène : une randonnée et une carte. » [plastik] [online], Plastik #04 Art et biodiversité : un art durable ?, 15 février 2014. ISSN 2101-0323.

"The Gift : le don et ses réseaux", Figures de l’art, n° XXIX, février 2015. English translation: The Gift and its networks.

“From Networked Art to Programmed Drifts” (abstract HDR), Leonardo, Vol. 48, Issue 5, October 2015, p. 480. Also online: Top Ranked LABS Abstracts 2014.

"Remapping the Neighborhood," Antiatlas Journal N°4, 2020.

"Tranche-montagne", Nouvelle revue d’esthétique, 2023/2 (n° 32), p. 113-116. DOI : 10.3917/nre.032.0113. URL : https://www.cairn.info/revue-nouvelle-revue-d-esthetique-2023-2-page-113.htm

Articles published in conference proceedings

“Esthétique de la souillure féminine”, dans les Actes du colloque L’enjeu de la représentation: le corps, organisé par Michel Journiac, Sorbonne, Université de Paris I, 1988, pp. 19–26. Réédité dans Michel Journiac, L’enjeu de la représentation: le corps, Ed. du CERAP, 1998

“Art Projects for the Web: The ArtChivist Site” dans X Encontro Nacional da ANPAP (Associação Nacional de Pesquisadores em Artes Plásticas), São Paulo, ANAIS 99, Brésil, 1999, vol.1, pp. 25–34.

“A Map Larger than the Territory”, ICHIM 04, Berlin, Actes du Colloque International, 2004.

"Partially Buried University », ISEA 2011, Istanbul 14-21 Septembre 2011, http://isea2011.sabanciuniv.edu/paper/partially-buried-university

"Walking and Mapping: Everyday Technologies and Artistic Engagement. », in Chihiro Minato (dir.), Timewalker : Media and Memory in a Mobile Society. Proceedings of the International Convention on Media Arts, Tokyo.

"Géolocalisation en temps réel : ‘la fin des cartes’ » Actes de L’OBS/IN (Observatoire des pratiques de création de l’image numérique) #4, Marseille, décembre 2015, pp. 94-101.

“Cart’Expé@IPEm : Cartographies expérimentales et caméras embarquées“, in Venturelli, S. et C. Rocha, Actes du colloque 15 Art. Encontro Internaconal de Arte e Tecnologia. Brasilia, Museu Nacional do Conjunto Cultural da República et Universidade de Brasília, Instituto de Artes, 2016, p. 430-437.

"Cart’Expé@IPEm : Cartographies expérimentales et caméras embarquées », in Biagio D’Angelo, François Soulages et Suzete Venturelli, dirs. De la photographie au post-digital. Du contemporain au post-contemporain, Paris, L’Harmattan, 2017.

Other articles and exhibition catalogues

“ Paris Réseau ”, catalogue de l’exposition Art Tecnologia, Arte no século XXI : a humanização das tecnologias, Museu de Arte Contemporãnea (MAC-USP), São Paulo, Brésil, 1995.

“Paris Réseau/Network”, Des livres à venir, Enghien-les-bains, du 12 janvier au 14 février; Auvers-sur-Oise du 15 mars au 16 avril; Argenteuil, du 6 mai au 31 mai, 2004; Taverny en octobre 2004 (catalogue).

“Tous collectionnés, repérés et fichés, l’art et l’archivage” entretien avec Daphné Le Sergent in « L’esprit de collection », Area N°9 printemps 2005

« Eavesdroplets@Dispatx », Authoring Software, Judy Malloy, ed., https://www.narrabase.net (novembre 2010).

« Partially Buried Utopie », la Revue du Cube, N°2, mars 2012, https://www.cuberevue.com/ PDF RevueCube-2-Web

“An Inmate’s Diary” (short text on a photograph by Ahlam Shibli), What Matters Now, Aperture Magazine N°213, Winter 2013.

“Review of Re-collection: Art, New Media, and Social Memory“, Leonardo Reviews, February 2015.

== Awards ==
In 1997 she received the Leonardo Award for Excellence.

== See also ==
- Fax art
