= Dezső Tandori =

Hungarian writer, poet, and literary translator (1938–2019)

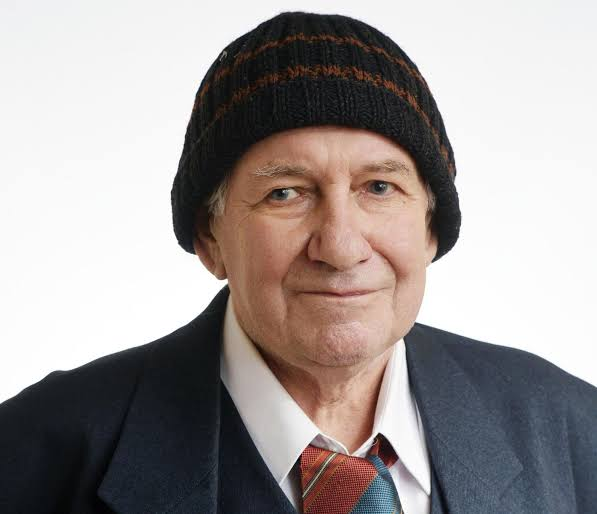
Dezső Tandori

Dezső Tandori (8 December 1938 – 13 February 2019) was a Hungarian writer, poet and literary translator. He was a member of the Széchenyi Academy of Literature and Arts and a founding member of the Digital Literature Academy. While publishing poetry and novels mainly under his own name, he also wrote detective fiction under the pseudonym Nat Roid.

Tandori was born into a family of officials. He completed his high school studies in Budapest, and in 1957 he received a degree in German language studies from Eötvös Lórand University. He then worked as a high school teacher for a short time. From 1971, Tandori earned his living as a freelance writer and translator. During his early career, he became acquainted with Ágnes Nemes Nagy, then a young grammar school teacher, and her literary circle (including Miklós Mészöly, Géta Ottlik, and Iván Mándy). His first two books of poetry, A Fragment to Hamlet (1968) and Cleansing of a Found Object (1973) are regarded as landmarks in Hungarian literature. Tandori adopted a reclusive lifestyle which became legendary in the 1970s and 1980s. In the 1990s, he began to travel, visiting Vienna, Paris, London, Copenhagen, and some German cities. During this period, he incorporated his experiences with Western horseracing and racetrack culture into his work. In his later years he translated seven novels of Virginia Woolf and wrote a book of personal essays on the project: Burnt-out Cells (2008).

Tandori's awards include the Kossuth Prize (1998) and the Attila József Prize (1978).

Tandori died on 13 February 2019 in Budapest at the age of 80.
