= Norie Neumark =

Australian artist

Norie Neumark is a sound and media artist who lives and works in Melbourne, Australia. She is part of the art group Out-of-Sync, an art collaboration with Maria Miranda.

== Work ==
Neumark was Professor of Media Art at University of Technology, Sydney, where she was founding Director of the Centre for Media Arts Innovation (CMAI) at UTS.

Neumark is founding editor of Unlikely Journal for Creative Arts, and founding director of the Centre for Creative Arts at La Trobe University in Melbourne. She is Emeritus Professor at La Trobe and Honorary Professorial Fellow at the Victorian College of the Arts, University of Melbourne.

== Publications ==
=== Books ===
- Voicetracks: Attuning to Voice in Media and the Arts. (2017). Cambridge, MA: MIT Press.
- Voice: Vocal Aesthetics in Digital Arts and Media. (2010). Co-edited with Ross Gibson and Theo van Leeuwen. Cambridge, MA: MIT Press.
- At a Distance: Precursors to Internet Art and Activism. (2006). Co-edited with Annemarie Chandler. Cambridge, MA: MIT Press.

=== Radio essays and media art ===
In the 1990s Neumark made a series of audio essays for the Listening Room, the premier radio arts program of the Australian Broadcasting Corporation (ABC Radio National). Several were also broadcast on New American Radio.

Radiophonic essays include
Jobs for the Girls, or What Do You See When You Look in the Mirror? (1991)
Into the Interface (1994)
Shock (1995)
Separation Anxiety: not the truth about alchemy (1996)
Dead Centre: the body with organs (1998)
Esprit de Corps: oscillating with emotion (1999)
First Report (2003)

In 2003 she initiated and collaborated on the radio/internet drama Checklist for an Armed Robber. This was an ABC/UTS project.

In the 1990s Neumark initiated several projects in new media art, exploring the potential for sound in the new medias. Initially, she made CDROM art, making one of the first Australian art CDROMs, the multi-award-winning Shock in the Ear, with an innovative use of sound. It was one of the first CDROMs to be funded by the Australian Film Commission (1997). Shock in the Ear was included in the international CDROM exhibition Contact Zones: the art of CDROM, curated by Timothy Murray. (1999)

== Awards for Shock in the Ear ==
- First Prize for multimedia, VideoFormes 2000 (Clermont Ferrand, 2000)
- First Prize for experimental CD-ROM, ATOM awards (Melbourne, 1999)
- First Prize, CD-ROM award at COMTECart (Dresden, 1998) --CynetArt replaced COMTECart in 2001
- Silver Medal at Invision 98 (San Francisco, 1998)
- Third Prize in the National Digital Art Awards (Brisbane, 1998) [First in CD-ROMs]
- Special mention at Videobrasil (São Paulo, 1998)

Shock in the Ear was also a new media installation shown at Artspace, Sydney (1997) and Artemesia Gallery, Chicago (1997).

== Other collaborative new media installations ==
Dead Centre: the body with organs at The Performance Space, Sydney (July 1999) and in the ABC’s online zine Headspace "in the making".

Volcano a new media installation, Artspace, Sydney 2001 and invited to "Gegenort - The Virtual Mine," 2001, Germany.

In 2004 Neumark, in collaboration with Maria Miranda, made Searching for rue Simon-Crubellier, ostensibly a search through the streets and bureaucracies of Paris for the fictive street written about by Georges Perec in his celebrated novel Life: A User’s Manual. This project began a new series of mobile works, with searching acting as the frame and motif for performative encounters with strangers. Other mobile works include: Talking About the Weather (2006), In Search of the Inland Sea (2008), and Down the Drain (2011).

In 2007 Neumark co-curated the exhibition Weather Trouble.

In 2010 she co-curated Memory Flows at the Armory, Sydney.

In addition to other awards, Neumark has had residencies at both the MacDowell Colony in New Hampshire in 2006 and the Cité internationale des arts in Paris in 2006.
