= Chuck Welch =

American mail artist (born 1948)

Chuck Welch, also known as the CrackerJack Kid or Jack Kid, was born in Kearney, Nebraska, on 5 October 1948. He wrote Eternal Network: A Mail Art Anthology, with a foreword by Ken Friedman, which was published and edited by University of Calgary Press in 1995. Eternal Network and the Crackerjack Kid were mentioned in a review of mail art titled "Pushing the Envelope" in 2001, and the archivist and curator Judith Hoffberg wrote about him in her publication Umbrella. His awards include a Fulbright Grant and NEA Hilda Maehling Fellowship.

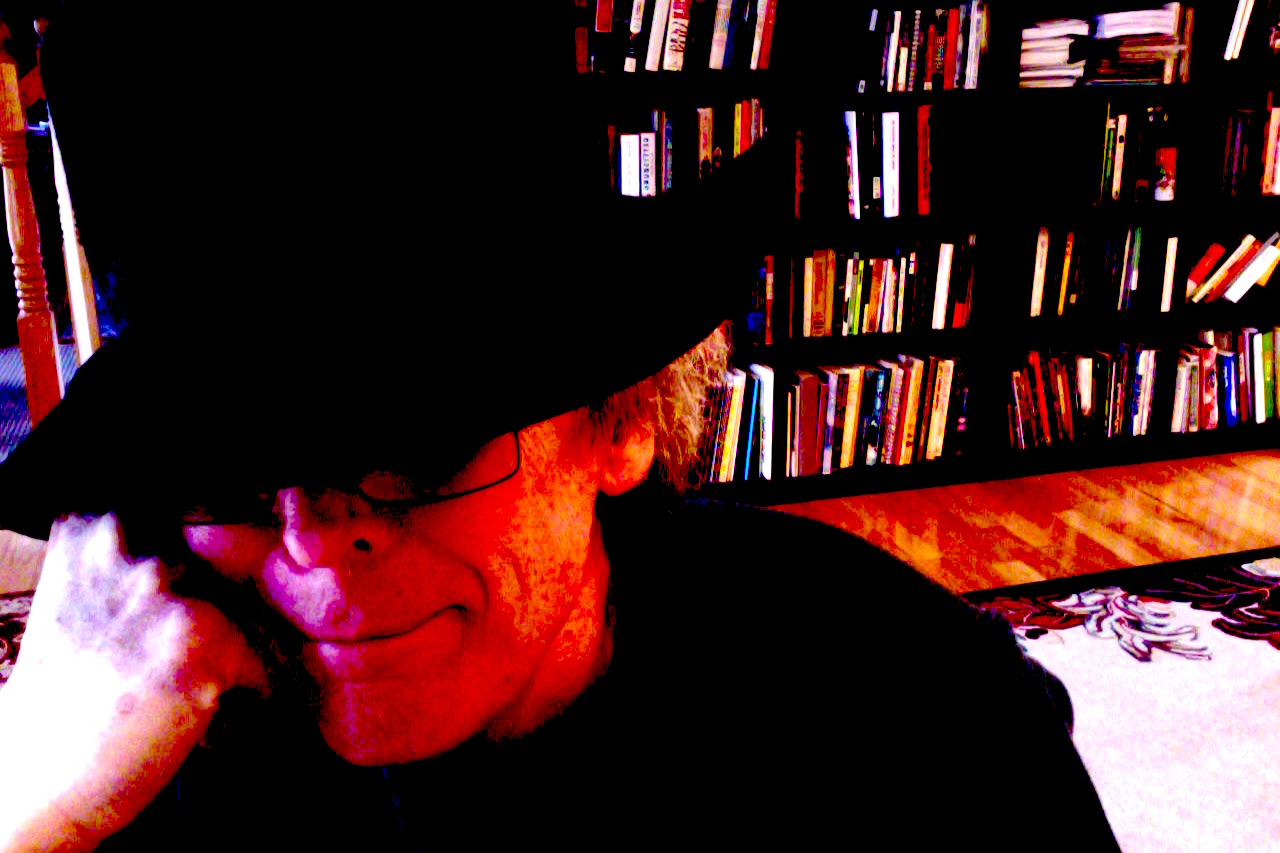
Crackerjack Kid, a.k.a. Chuck Welch, mail artist, Photo self-portrait, 2-4-16

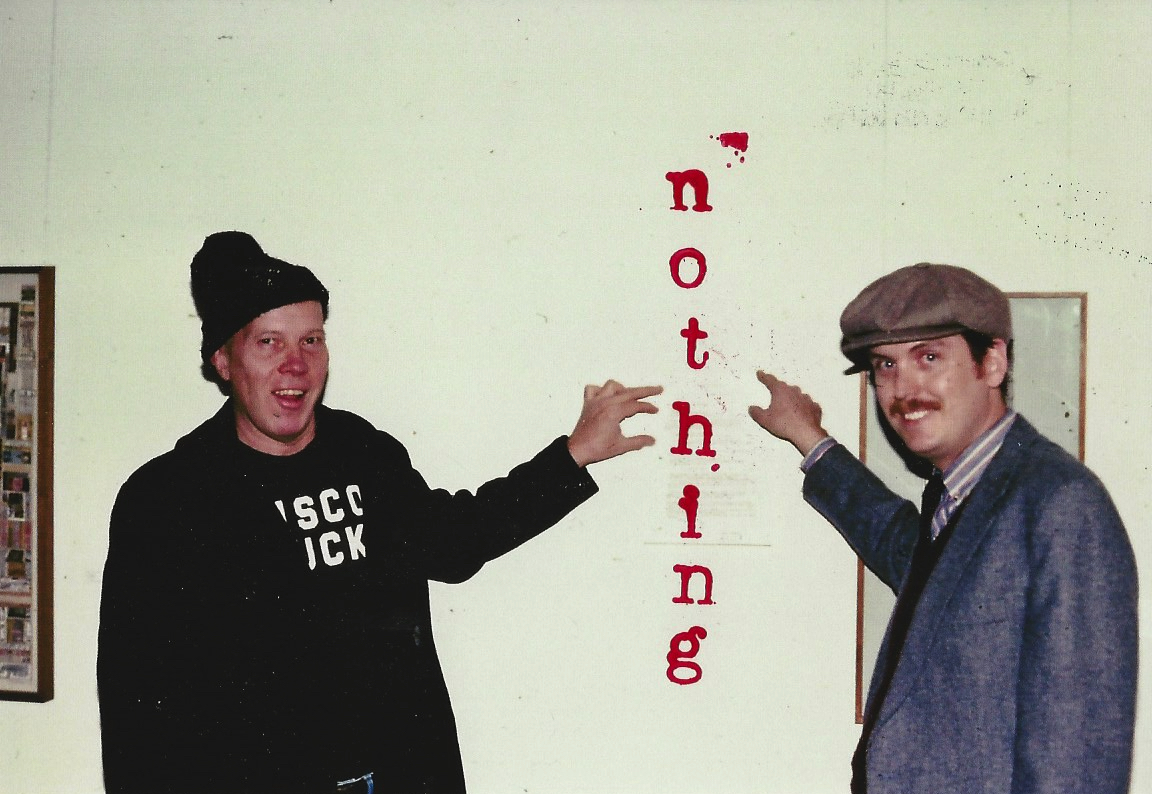
Ray Johnson and CrackerJack Kid, February 1984

Chuck Welch chose the pseudonym "CrackerJack Kid" because as a mail artist he went to the mail box each day never knowing what surprise he was going to find inside. Welch was first exposed to mail art through the exhibition Omaha Flow Systems curated by Ken Friedman at the Joslyn Art Museum in Nebraska in 1973, and he became actively involved in fluxus mail art in 1978. Welch was a member of Ray Johnson‘s New York Correspondance School, also spelled "New York CorresponDance School". Both Welch and Johnson were in regular contact. Johnson kept mailing to Welch's daughter and referred to her as CrackerJack's Kid, and she became a mail artist, too.

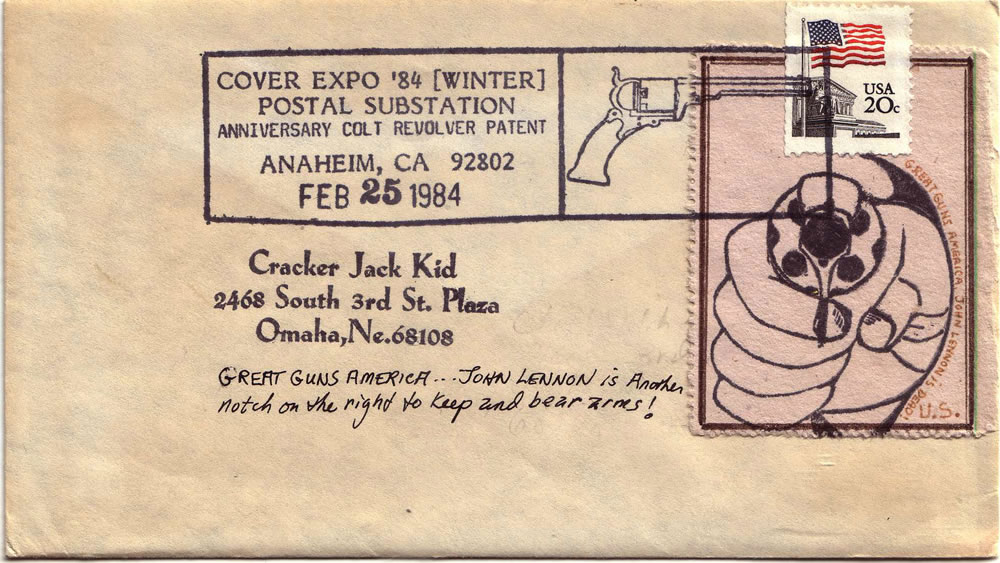
CrackerJackKid Envelope1984

Welch participated in the exhibition Flux Flags in Budapest, Hungary, in 1992. In 1997 he had a solo exhibition in Guy Bleus' E-Mail Art Archives, Center for Visual Arts in Hasselt, Belgium. He wrote about Fluxus and Ray Johnson, as well as about global art zines.

== Mail art networking ==
In a letter to mail artist Anna Banana, Welch wrote the treatise "Welch | Mail Art Archiving: Not Necessarily By the Letter." Some CrackerJack Kid (Chuck Welch) correspondence is archived in the Oberlin College library's mail art collection. There was great dissension among mail artists about the mail art, performance art, xerographic art, and email art rules, origins and guidelines which sometimes were seen as too exclusionary, non-democratic, subversive, or elitist. Matt Ferranto wrote that "Some take a conceptual view of mail art. Chuck Welch, a prolific mail artist known as "The Crackerjack Kid" and editor of Eternal Network: A Mail Art Anthology, contends that 'information, communication aesthetics, and cultural motivation determine whether an artwork or artist fit within the complex Mail Art and Networking movements." Conversely, others like Kornelia Röder, the co-editor of East Europe in International Network, explain the movement in political terms. "Mail art does not mean the personal correspondence between two persons," writes Röder, but rather is 'the communication with art to projects arranged concretely which are often motivated by the socio-political context.'"

== Welch on mail art as a democratic forum ==
The Village Voice remarked on the "mail art melée" which arose when the curator of a mail art show at Franklin Furnace did not include all the submissions to the exhibition. Matt Ferranto quoted Welch in reference to the medium's usual revolutionary stance and its art historical importance, "Mail art…(is) based on principles of free exchange and international access to all people, regardless of nationality, race, or creed," says Chuck Welch, who also calls it "a democratic based forum existing outside traditional art systems."

Chuck Welch was a participating artist in the collaborative publications of the International Society of Copier Artists and was included in the I.S.C.A. Quarterly : Anniversary issue, Vol. 1 No. 4 (April 1983).

Mail Art From Analog to Digital - The Electronic Museum of Mail Art

In 1986, while pursuing his M.F.A. Degree at Boston Museum School and Tufts University, Welch began investigating the possibility of establishing a mail art presence on the global internet. In 1989, while at Dartmouth College, Welch frequented the Kiewit Computation Center where he learned HTML and established a direct bridge between the Internet (switched packet systems) and the analog mail art network. Welch organized a six-year project from 1991-1997 titled Telenetlink which included an Emailart Directory that was distributed via Artur Mattock's Reflux Network Project at the 1991 São Paulo Biennial. Claire Voon said of Telenetlink, "The project naturally considers and is informed by the history of mail art, which emerged in the 1950s and ’60s from the Fluxus movement. Email art itself isn’t a novel concept, with roots in the 1990s: Chuck Welch, for one, who was part of Ray Johnson’s New York Correspondence School, was exploring connections between physical mail and the internet in his project Telenetlink. Mail art has long been appreciated as an alternative way to view and distribute art without relying on a physical exhibition space and dealing with the regulated structures of the art world". Hungarian critic and theoretician Géza Perneczky wrote in THE MAGAZINE NETWORK that "milestones were set up in the field of telecommunication 'host systems" including Welch's "Telenetlink" (1991). Perneczky added, "Undeniably, Welch's initiative should be considered the most advanced link between the mail art network and the Global Telematic Community".

In 1992, Welch created a Networker Databank at The University of Iowa's Alternative Traditions in the Contemporary Arts Archive and at the Museum of Modern Art. The Networker Databank functions as a repository for metadata documenting 180 worldwide events during the Decentralized Worldwide Networker Congresses. On January 1, 1995 Welch went online with mail art's first World Wide Web site known as EMMA - The Electronic Museum of Mail Art. Besides being the WWW's first virtual reality art museum with its library, research center, links, and galleries, EMMA included in its exhibition halls the first online mail art show dedicated to Ray Johnson who had died January 13, 1995. Welch wrote and recorded "The Ballad of Ray Johnson", a blues song that was embedded on the EMMA website weeks after Johnson's death by drowning. A second exhibition, titled "Cyberstamps", included the first exhibition of online digital Artistamps.

== His correspondence as an art medium ==
Chuck Welch was one of the few mail artists who sometimes used traditional etching techniques rather than rubber stamps or real stamps as imagery for his mail art. "During the late 1960s mail art contained illegal visa rubber stamps, false official stamps, and even fake passports page by page," said Valery Oisteanu in "ILLEGAL MAIL ART (a poetical essay)" published in FLUE for Franklin Furnace. Welch's art is included in the mail art collection of the Getty Museum, and he is listed in the downloadable reference Google book ARTPOOL.

In Networked Art, Craig Saper discusses Chuck Welch's "metamorphosis" project in terms of networking functions as an art medium, and the "craft" involved in mail-art "neither ornaments an interactive process nor makes a conceptual artwork pretty, but functions as conceptual art itself." Welch's works ask "participants to remember stories related to personal and precious clothing, to construct a type of memorial to something precious that they have lost, and to build a community from these efforts."

Chuck Welch wrote in 1995, "Cultural exchange is a radical act. It can create paradigms for the reverential sharing and preservation of the earth's water, soil, forests, plants and animals. The ethereal networker aesthetic calls for guiding that dream through action. Cooperation and participation, and the celebration of art as a birthing of life, vision, and spirit are first steps. The artists who meet each other in the Eternal Network have taken these steps. Their shared enterprise is a contribution to our common future."
