= Mail art =

Artistic movement centered on sending small-scale works through the postal service

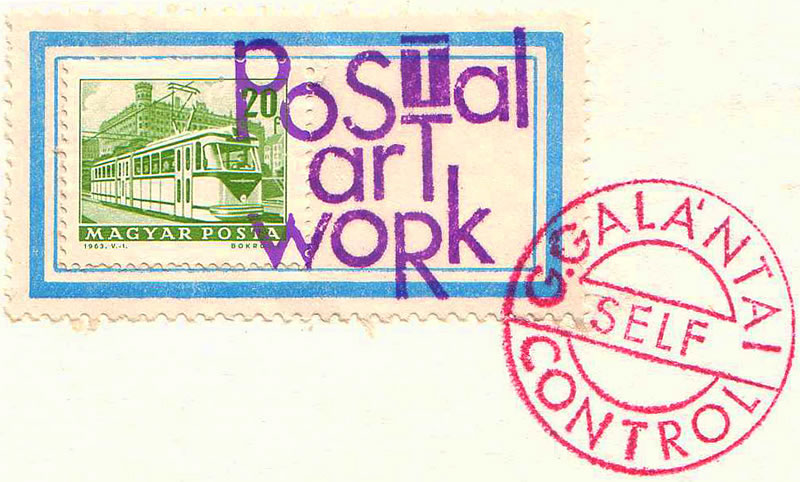
Mail art by György Galántai, 1981

Mail art, also known as postal art and correspondence art, is an artistic movement centered on sending small-scale works through the postal service. It developed out of what eventually became Ray Johnson's New York Correspondance School and the Fluxus movements of the 1960s. It has since developed into a global, ongoing movement.

== Characteristics ==
Media commonly used in mail art include postcards, paper, a collage of found or recycled images and objects, rubber stamps, artist-created stamps (called artistamps), and paint, but can also include music, sound art, poetry, or anything that can be put in an envelope and sent via post. Mail art is considered art once it is dispatched. Mail artists regularly call for thematic or topical mail art for use in (often unjuried) exhibition.

Mail artists appreciate interconnection with other artists. The art form promotes an egalitarian way of creating that frequently circumvents official art distribution and approval systems such as the art market, museums, and galleries. Mail artists rely on their alternative "outsider" network as the primary way of sharing their work, rather than being dependent on the ability to locate and secure exhibition space.

Mail art can be seen as anticipating the cyber communities founded on the Internet.

== History ==
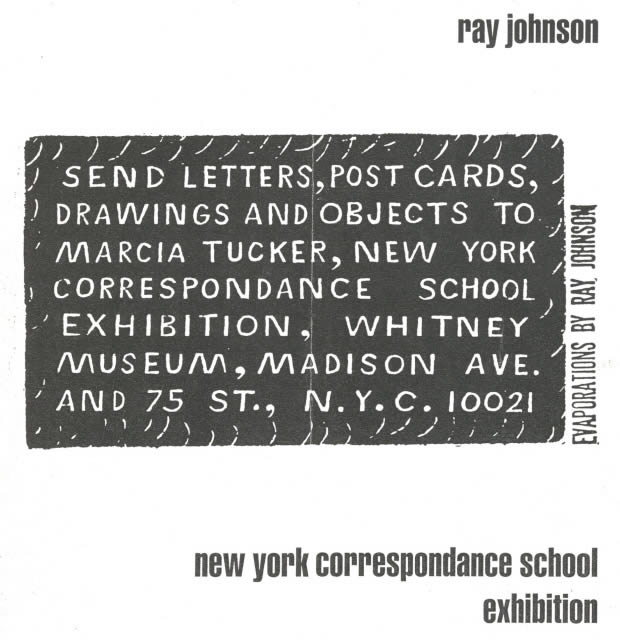
Ray Johnson's invitation to the first mail art show, 1970

Artist Edward M. Plunkett has argued that communication-as-art-form is an ancient tradition; he posits (tongue in cheek) that mail art began when Cleopatra had herself delivered to Julius Caesar in a rolled-up carpet.

=== Ray Johnson, New York Correspondance School, and Fluxus ===
The American artist Ray Johnson is considered to be the first mail artist. Johnson's experiments with art in the mail began in 1943, while the posting of instructions and soliciting of activity from his recipients began in the mid-1950s with the mailing of his "moticos", and thus provided mail art with a blueprint for the free exchange of art via post.

The term "mail art" was coined in the 1960s. In 1962, Plunkett coined the term "New York Correspondence School" to refer to Johnson's activities; Johnson adopted this moniker but sometimes intentionally misspelled it as "correspondance". The deliberate misspelling was characteristic of the playful spirit of the Correspondance School and its actions.

Most of the Correspondance School members are fairly obscure, and the letters they sent, often featuring simple drawings or stickers, often instructed the recipient to perform some fairly simple action. Johnson's work consists primarily of letters, often with the addition of doodles and rubber stamped messages, which he mailed to friends and acquaintances. The Correspondance School was a network of individuals who were artists by virtue of their willingness to play along and appreciate Johnson's sense of humor. One example of the activities of the Correspondance School consisted in calling meetings of fan clubs, such as one devoted to the actress Anna May Wong. Many of Johnson's missives to his network featured a hand drawn version of what became a personal logo or alter-ego, a bunny head.

In a 1968 interview, Johnson explained that he found mailed correspondence interesting because of the limits it puts on the usual back and forth interaction and negotiation that comprises communication between individuals. Correspondence is "a way to convey a message or a kind of idea to someone which is not verbal; it is not a confrontation of two people. It's an object which is opened in privacy, probably, and the message is looked at ... You look at the object and, depending on your degree of interest, it very directly gets across to you what is there".

In 1970, Johnson and Marcia Tucker organized The New York Correspondence School Exhibition at the Whitney Museum in New York, which was the first significant public exhibition of the mail art genre.

On April 5, 1973, Johnson declared the "death" of the New York Correspondance School in an unpublished letter to the Obituary Department of The New York Times and in copies that he circulated to his network. However, he continued to practice mail art even after this.

Although much of Johnson's work was initially given away, this has not prevented it from attaining a market value. Andy Warhol is quoted as saying he "would pay ten dollars for anything by Johnson."

In his 1973 diagram showing the development and scope of Fluxus, George Maciunas included mail art among the activities pursued by the Fluxus artist Robert Filliou. Filliou coined the term the "Eternal Network" that has become synonymous with mail art. Other Fluxus artists have been involved since the early 1960s in the creation of artist's postage stamps (Robert Watts, Stamp Dispenser, 1963), postcards (Ben Vautier, The Postman's Choice, 1965: a postcard with a different address on each side) and other works connected to the postal medium. Indeed, the mail art network counts many Fluxus members among its earliest participants. While Johnson did not consider himself directly as a member of the Fluxus school, his interests and attitudes were consistent with those of a number of Fluxus artists.

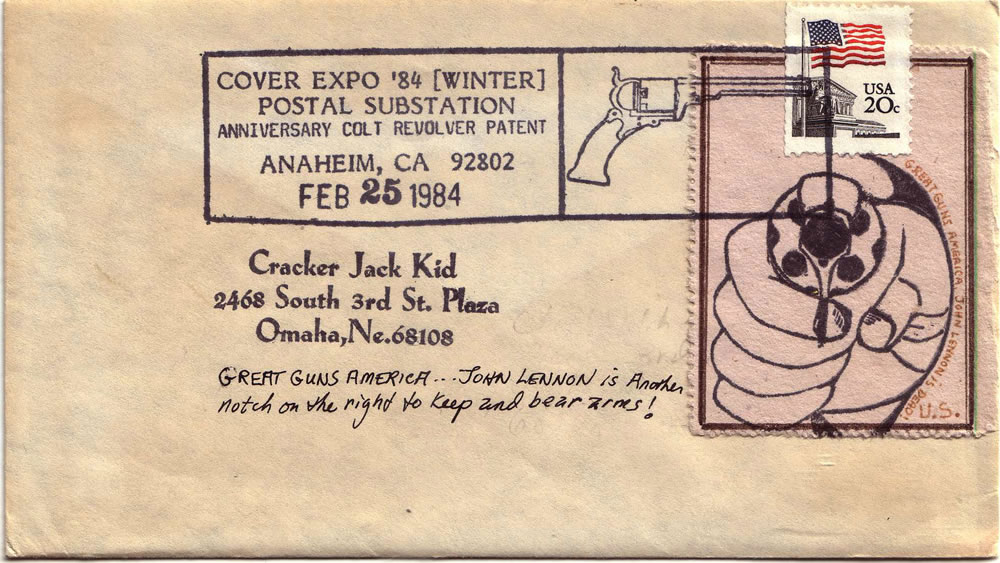
Mail art stamp and envelope with official Colt Anniversary postmark – Chuck Welch, a.k.a. Cracker Jack Kid, 1984

=== 1970s and 1980s ===
In the 1970s, the practice of mail art grew considerably, providing a cheap and flexible channel of expression for cultural outsiders. In Canada, the artist collectives Image Bank and General Idea have been heralded as instrumental to the early history of networking and social interaction as art. Correspondence Art was particularly widespread where state censorship prevented a free circulation of alternative ideas, as in certain countries behind the Iron Curtain or in South America.

The growth of a sizable mail art community, with friendships born out of personal correspondence and, increasingly, mutual visits, led in the 1980s to the organization of several festivals, meetings and conventions where networkers could meet, socialize, perform, exhibit and plan further collaborations. Among these events were the Inter Dada Festivals organized in California in the early 1980s and the Decentralized Mail Art Congress of 1986.

In 1984 curator Ronny Cohen organized an exhibition for the Franklin Furnace, New York, called "Mail Art Then and Now." The exhibition was to have an historical aspect as well as showing new mail art, and to mediate the two aspects Cohen edited the material sent to Franklin Furnace, breaking an unwritten but commonly accepted custom that all works submitted must be shown. The intent to edit, interpreted as censorship, resulted in a two-part panel discussion sponsored by Artists Talk on Art (organized by mail artist Carlo Pittore and moderated by art critic Robert C. Morgan) in February of that year, where Cohen and the mail artists were to debate the issues.

The night preceding the second panel on February 24, Carlo Pittore, John P. Jacob, Chuck Welch a.k.a. CrackerJack Kid, David Cole, and John Held Jr. crafted a statement asking Cohen to step down as the panel moderator. Welch delivered the statement whereby Cohen was asked to remain on the panel but forfeit her right to serve as moderator. Instead of remaining, Cohen chose to leave the event. After some give and take with both panelists and audience, Cohen left, saying, "Have fun, boys." Her entourage walked out with her during the ensuing melee.

The excluded works were ultimately added to the exhibition by the staff of the Franklin Furnace, but the events surrounding it and the panels revealed ideological rifts within the mail art community. Simultaneously fanning the flames and documenting the extent to which it was already dominated by a small, mostly male, coterie of artists, the discussions were transcribed and published by panelist John P. Jacob in his short-lived mail art zine PostHype. In a letter to panelist Mark Bloch, Ray Johnson (who was not a panelist) commented on the reverse-censorship and sexism of the event.

The rise of mail art meetings and congresses during the late 80s, and the articulation of various "isms" proclaimed by their founders as movements within mail art, were in part a response to fractures made visible by the events surrounding the Franklin Furnace exhibition. Even if "tourism" was proposed satirically as a new movement by H. R. Fricker, a Swiss mail artist who was one of the organizers of the 1986 Mail Art Congress, nevertheless mail art in its pure form would continue to function without the personal meeting between so-called networkers.

In the mid-1980s, Fricker and Bloch, in a bilingual "Open Letter To Everybody in the Network" stated, "1) An important function of the exhibitions and other group projects in the network is: to open channels to other human beings. 2) After your exhibition is shown and the documentation sent, or after you have received such a documentation with a list of addresses, use the channels! 3) Create person-to-person correspondence... 4) You have your own unique energy which you can give to others through your work: visual audio, verbal, etc. 5) This energy is best used when it is exchanged for energy from another person with the same intentions. 6) the power of the network is in the quality of the direct correspondence, not the quantity." The manifesto concludes, "We have learned this from our own mistakes."

=== 1990s and the impact of the Internet era ===
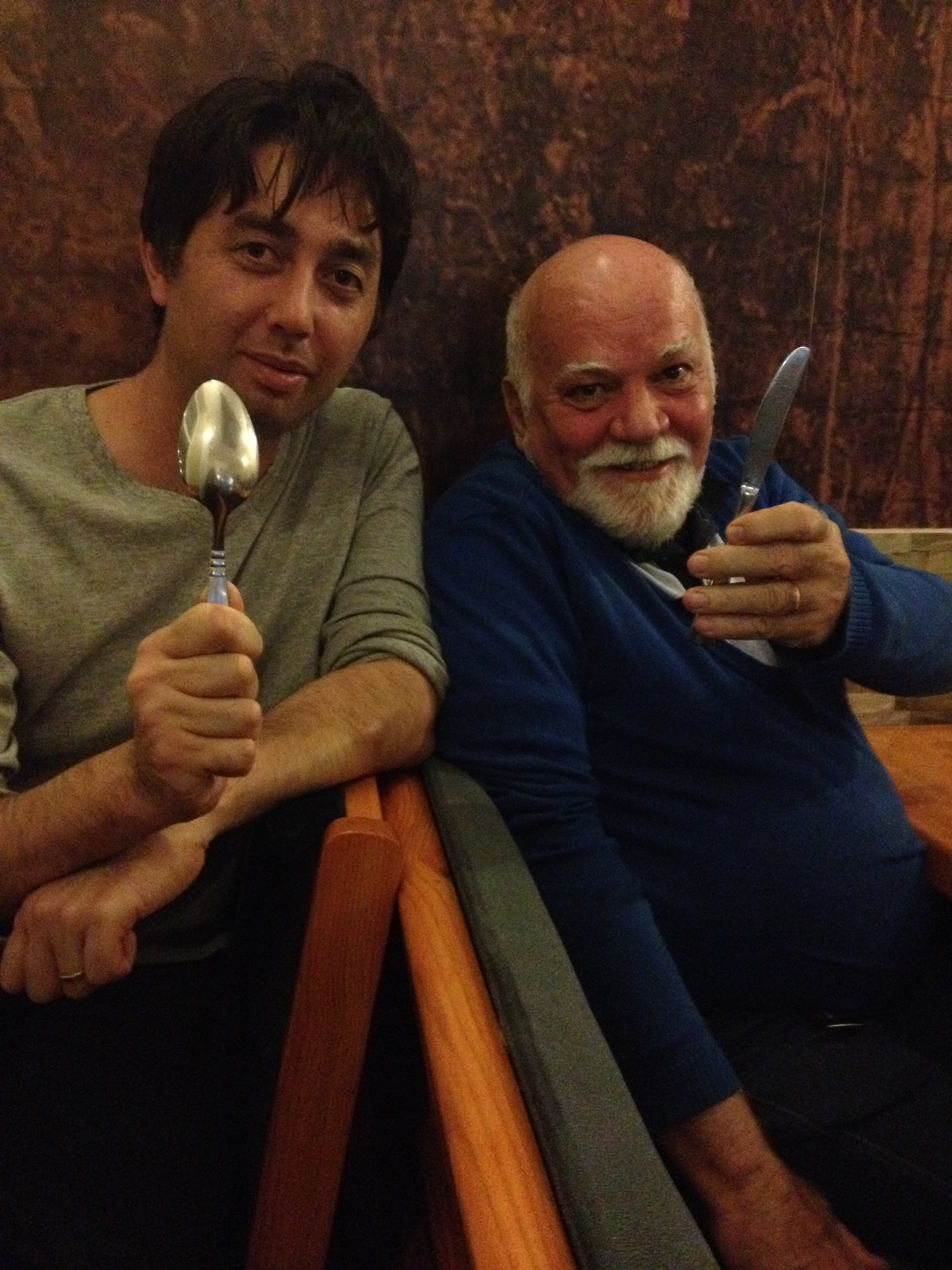
American mail-artist David Horvitz (active since the 2000s) meets Brazilian mail artist Paulo Bruscky (active since the 1970s) in Berlin, Germany in November 2015

In 1994, Dutch mail artist Ruud Janssen began a series of mail-interviews which became an influential contribution in the field of mail art.

By the 1990s, mail art's peak in terms of global postal activities had been reached, and mail artists, aware of increasing postal rates, were beginning the gradual migration of collective art projects towards the web and new, cheaper forms of digital communication. The Internet facilitated faster dissemination of mail art calls (invitations) and precipitated the involvement of newcomers.

== Philosophy and norms of the mail artist network ==
In spite of the many links and similarities between historical avant-garde, alternative art practices (visual poetry, copy art, artist's books) and mail art, one aspect that distinguishes the creative postal network from other artistic movements, schools, or groups (including Fluxus) is the way it disregards and circumvents the commercial art market. Any person with access to a mailbox can participate in the postal network and exchange free artworks, and each mail artist is free to decide how and when to answer (or not answer) a piece of incoming mail. Participants are invited by network members to take part in collective projects or unjuried exhibitions in which entries are not selected or judged. While contributions may be solicited around a particular theme, work to a required size, or sent in by a deadline, mail art generally operates within a spirit of "anything goes."

The mail art philosophy of openness and inclusion is exemplified by the "rules" included in invitations (calls) to postal projects: a mail art show has no jury, no entry fee, there is no censorship, and all works are exhibited. The original contributions are not to be returned and remain the property of the organizers, but a catalogue or documentation is sent free to all the participants in exchange for their works. Although these rules are sometimes stretched, they have generally held up for four decades, with only minor dissimilarities and adjustments, like the occasional requests to avoid works of explicit sexual nature, calls for projects with specific participants, or the recent trend to display digital documentation on blogs and websites instead of personally sending printed paper to contributors.

BananaPost '89 artistamps by Anna Banana, 1989

Mail art has been exhibited in alternative spaces such as private apartments, municipal buildings, and shop windows, as well as in galleries and museums worldwide. Mail art shows, periodicals, and projects represent the "public" side of postal networking, a practice that has at its core the direct and private interaction between the individual participants. Mail artists value the process of exchanging ideas and the sense of belonging to a global community that is able to maintain a peaceful collaboration beyond differences of language, religion and ideology; this is one aspect that differentiates the mail art network from the world of commercial picture postcards and of simply "mailed art."

A mail artist may have hundreds of correspondents from many different countries, or build a smaller core circle of favorite contacts. Mail art is widely practiced in Europe, North and South America, Russia, and Australia with smaller numbers of participants also in Africa, and China. In addition to being kept by the recipient, mail art archives have attracted the interest of libraries, archives, museums, and private collectors. Or, the works may be 'worked into' and recycled back to the sender or to another networker.

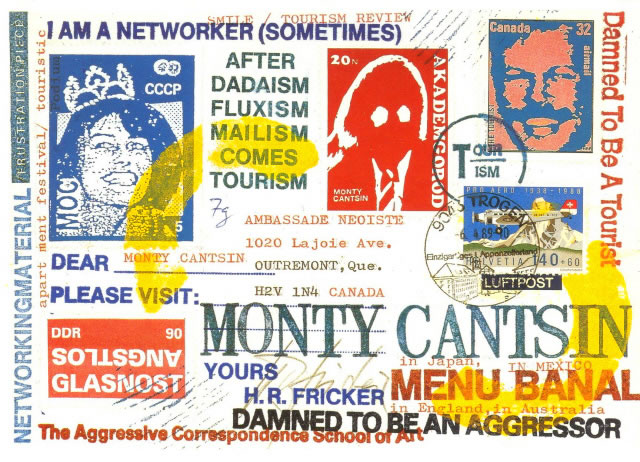
Mail art envelope from H. R. Fricker, 1990

Ray Johnson suggested (with a pun) that "mail art has no history, only a present", and mail artists have followed his playful attitude in creating their own mythologies. Parody art movements like neoism and plagiarism have challenged notions of originality, as have the shared pseudonymous names Monty Cantsin and Karen Eliot, which were proposed for serial use by anyone. Semi-fictional organizations have been set up and virtual lands invented, imaginary countries for which artistamps are issued. Furthermore, attempts have been made to document and define the history of a complex and underestimated phenomenon that has spanned five decades. Various essays, graduate theses, guides and anthologies of mail art writings have appeared in print and on the Internet, often written by veteran networkers. A sub-group of envelope art has its genesis in the Grateful Dead Ticket Service. Looking to help their fans avoid the high fees that are generated by national ticket services the Grateful Dead started their own service, commonly referred to as mail order. At some point fans started decorating their envelopes with art. Some for art's sake, others to grab the attention of the people that dole out tickets in hope of better seats.

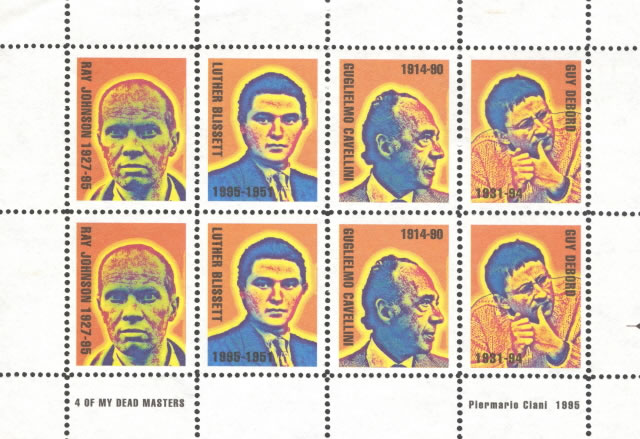
Sheet of artistamps by Piermario Ciani, c. 1995

== Media and artistic practices in the creation of mail artworks ==
Because the democratic ethos of mail art is one of inclusion, both in terms of participants ('anyone who can afford the postage') and in the scope of art forms, a broad range of media are employed in creation of mail artworks. Certain materials and techniques are commonly used and frequently favored by mail artists due to their availability, convenience, and ability to produce copies.

=== Rubberstamps and artistamps ===
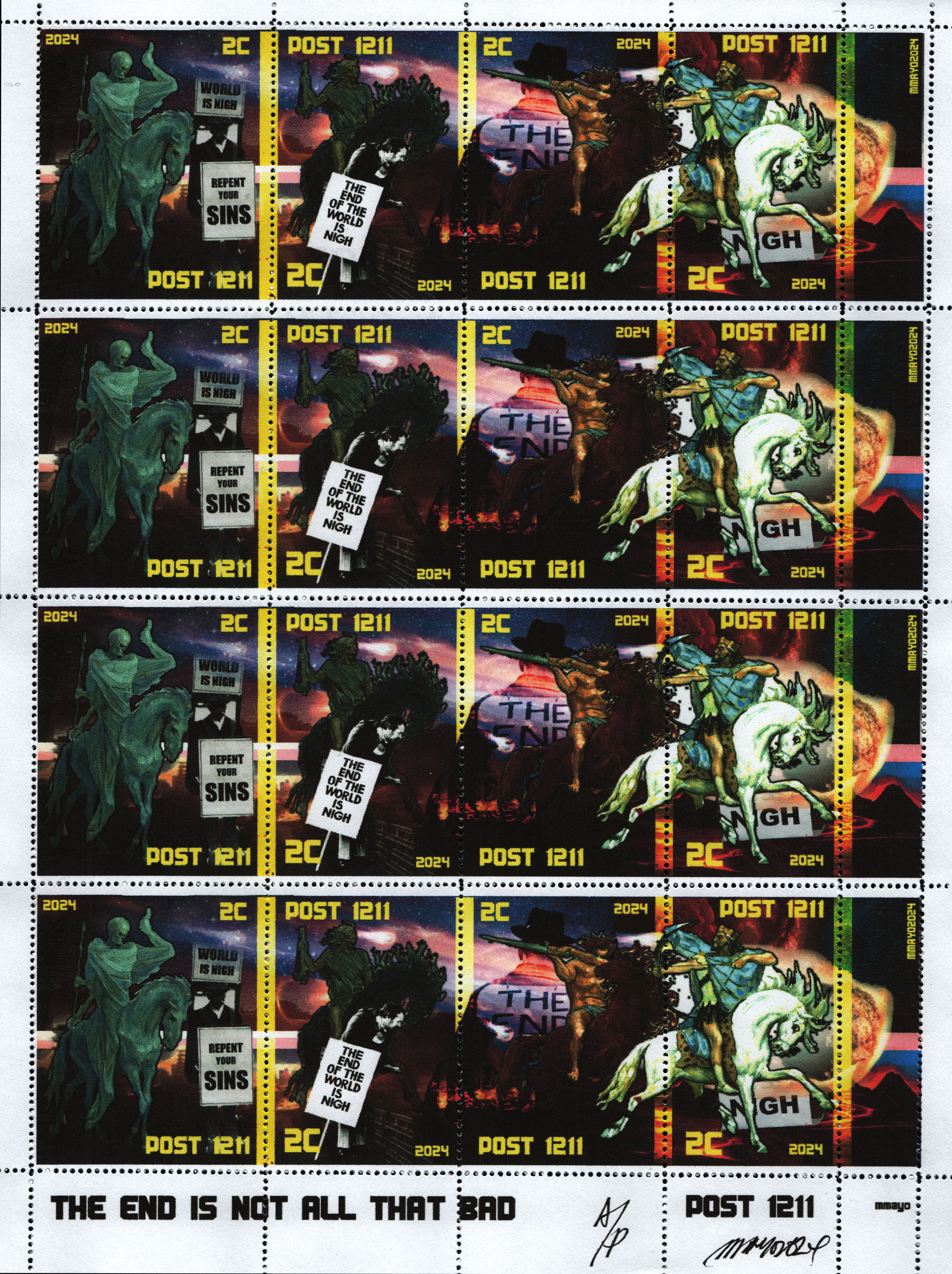
"The End" Issue Sheet by Post 1211 (2024) that was featured in issue 40 of the Artistamp Review

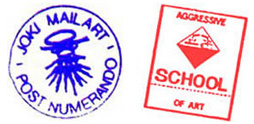
Mail art rubber stamps by Jo Klafki (left) and Mark Pawson (right), 1980s

Mail art has adopted and appropriated several of graphic forms already associated with the postal system. The rubber stamp officially used for franking mail, already utilized by Dada and Fluxus artists, has been embraced by mail artists who, in addition to reusing ready-made rubber stamps, have them professionally made to their own designs. They also carve into erasers with linocut tools to create handmade ones. These unofficial rubber stamps, whether disseminating mail artists' messages or simply announcing the identity of the sender, help to transform regular postcards into artworks and make envelopes an important part of the mail art experience.

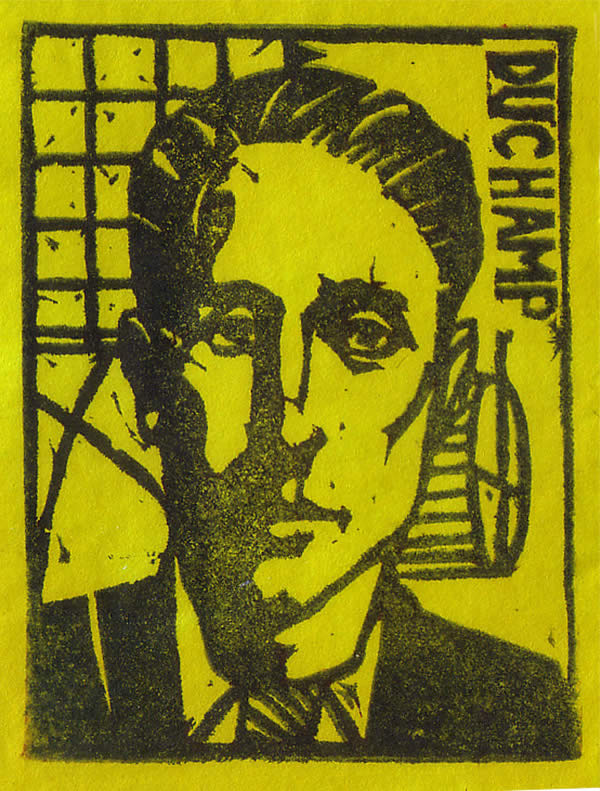
Carved eraser print by Paul Jackson, a.k.a. Art Nahpro, c. 1990

Mail art has also appropriated the postage stamp as a format for individual expression. Inspired by the example of Cinderella stamps and Fluxus faux-stamps, the artistamp has spawned a vibrant sub-network of artists dedicated to creating and exchanging their own stamps and stamp sheets. Artist Jerry Dreva of the conceptual art group Les Petits Bonbons created a set of stamps and sent them to David Bowie who then used them as the inspiration for the cover of the single "Ashes to Ashes" released in 1980. Artistamps and rubber stamps, have become important staples of mail artworks, particularly in the enhancement of postcards and envelopes. The most important anthology of rubberstamp art was published by the artist Hervé Fischer in his book Art and Marginal Communication, Balland, Paris, 1974 – in French, English and German, to note also the catalog of the exhibition "Timbres d'artistes", Published of Musée de la Poste, Paris, 1993, organized by the French artist Jean-Noël Laszlo – in French, English. Recently, an extensive compilation of artistamp artists was featured in 40 issues of the Artistamp Review. It was published by artist Adam Roussopoulos from 2019 through May 2024. Many notable artists were featured in the review including Jas Felter, E.F. Higgins III, John Held Jr., Michael Leigh, Chuck Welch, Vittore Baroni, and H.R. Fricker.

=== Envelopes ===
Some mail artists lavish more attention on the envelopes than the contents within. Painted envelopes are one-of-a-kind artworks with the handwritten address becoming part of the work. Stitching, embossing and an array of drawing materials can all be found on postcards, envelopes and on the contents inside.

=== Printing and copying ===
Printing is suited to mail artists who distribute their work widely. Various printmaking techniques, in addition to rubber stamping, are used to create multiples. Copy art (xerography, photocopy) is a common practice, with both mono and color copying being extensively used within the network. Ubiquitous 'add & pass' sheets that are designed to be circulated through the network with each artist adding and copying, chain-letter fashion, have also received some unfavorable criticism. However, Xerography has been a key technology in the creation of many short-run periodicals and zines about mail art, and for the printed documentation that has been the traditional project culmination sent to participants. Inkjet and laserprint computer printouts are also used, both to disseminate artwork and for reproducing zines and documentation, and PDF copies of paperless periodicals and unprinted documentation are circulated by email. Photography is widely used as an art form, to provide images for artistamps and rubber stamps, and within printed and digital magazines and documentation, while some projects have focused on the intersection of mail art with the medium itself.

=== Lettering and language ===
Lettering, whether handwritten or printed, is integral to mail art. The written word is used as a literary art form, as well as for personal letters and notes sent with artwork and recordings of the spoken word, both of poetry and prose, are also a part of the network. Although English has been the de facto language, because of the movement's inception in America, an increasing number of mail artists, and mail artist groups on the Internet, now communicate in Breton, French, Italian, German, Spanish, and Russian.

=== Other media ===
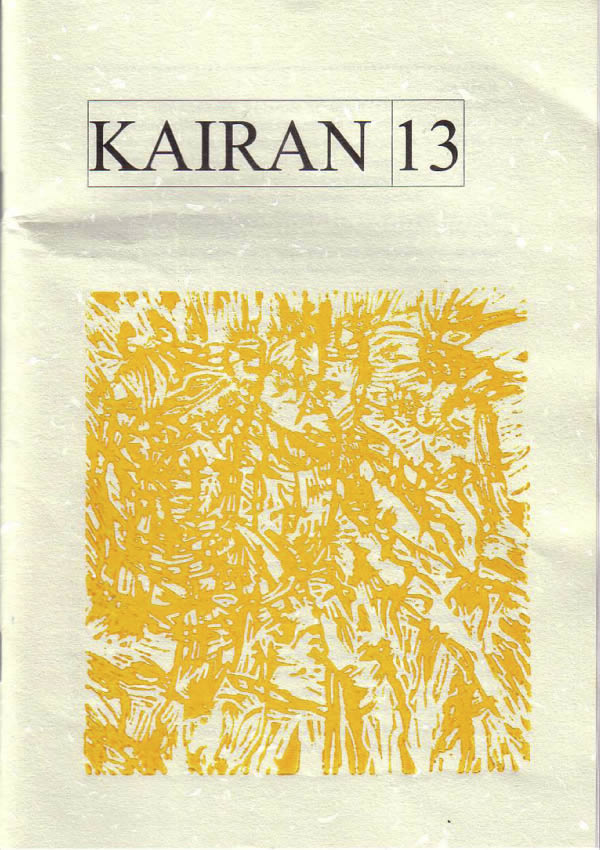
Cover of Kairan mail art zine, edited by Gianni Simone, a.k.a. Johnnyboy, 2007

In addition to appropriating the postage stamp model, mail artists have assimilated other design formats for printed artworks. Artists' books, decobooks and friendship books, banknotes, stickers, tickets, artist trading cards (ATCs), badges, food packaging, diagrams, and maps have all been used.

Mail artists routinely mix media; collage and photomontage are popular, affording some mail art the stylistic qualities of pop art or Dada. Mail artists often use collage techniques to produce original postcards, envelopes, and work that may be transformed using copy art techniques or computer software, then photocopied or printed out in limited editions.

Printed matter and ephemera are often circulated among mail artists, and after artistic treatment, these common items enter into the mail art network. Small assemblages, sculptural forms, or found objects of irregular shapes and sizes are parceled up or sent unwrapped to deliberately tease and test the efficiency of the postal service. Mailable fake fur ("Hairmail") and astroturf postcards were circulated in the late 1990s.

Having borrowed the notion of intermedia from Fluxus, mail artists are often active simultaneously in several different fields of expression. Music and sound art have long been celebrated aspects of mail art, at first using cassette tape, then on CD and as sound files sent via the Internet.

Performance art has also been a prominent facet, particularly since the advent of mail art meetings and congresses. Performances recorded on film or video are communicated via DVD and movie files over the internet. Video is also increasingly being employed to document mail art shows of all kinds.

== Quotations ==
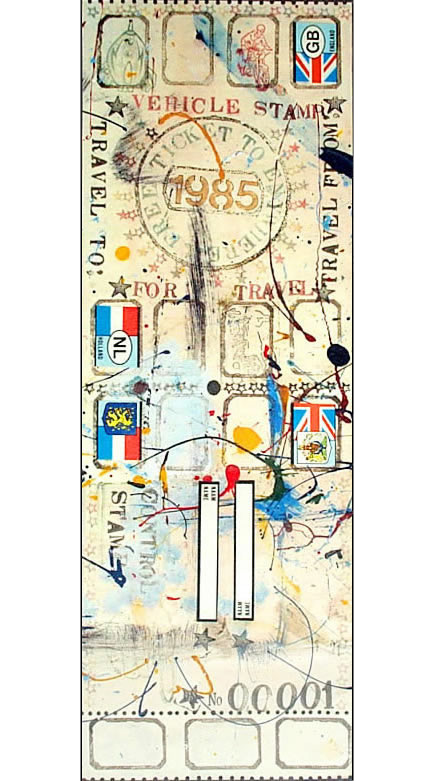
Mail art by A. D. Eker (Thuismuseum), 1985

Correspondence art is an elusive art form, far more variegated by its very nature than, say, painting. Where a painting always involves paint and a support surface, correspondence art can appear as any one of dozens of media transmitted through the mail. While the vast majority of correspondence art or mail art activities take place in the mail, today's new forms of electronic communication blur the edges of that forum. In the 1960s, when correspondence art first began to blossom, most artists found the postal service to be the most readily available – and least expensive – medium of exchange. Today's micro-computers with modern facilities offer anyone computing and communicating power that two decades ago were available only to the largest institutions and corporations, and only a few decades previous weren't available to anyone at any price. – Ken Friedman

Cultural exchange is a radical act. It can create paradigms for the reverential sharing and preservation of the earth's water, soil, forests, plants and animals. The ethereal networker aesthetic calls for guiding that dream through action. Cooperation and participation, and the celebration of art as a birthing of life, vision, and spirit are first steps. The artists who meet each other in the Eternal Network have taken these steps. Their shared enterprise is a contribution to our common future. – Chuck Welch

The purpose of mail art, an activity shared by many artists throughout the world, is to establish an aesthetical communication between artists and common people in every corner of the globe, to divulge their work outside the structures of the art market and outside the traditional venues and institutions: a free communication in which words and signs, texts and colours act like instruments for a direct and immediate interaction. – Loredana Parmesani
