= Circle Magazine =

American periodical (1944–1948)

Circle Magazine was published from 1944 to 1948 by George Leite, initially with poet Bern Porter. Produced at Leite's Berkeley, California, bookstore daliel's (stylized with a lowercase 'd'), it featured poetry, prose, criticism and art from many of those whose creative works and their successors would later come to be called the San Francisco Renaissance. In addition to the magazine, Circle Editions published contemporary authors such as Albert Cossery and Henry Miller (a personal friend of Leite's).

== Issue contents and covers ==
=== Number one, 1944 ===
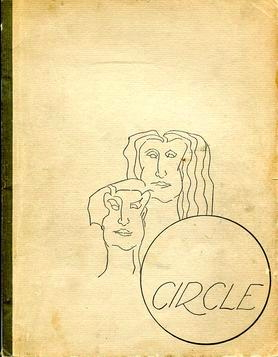
Cover of first issue, 1944

- Henry Miller – Open Letter to Small Magazines
- Philip Lamantia – Two Poems
- Bern Porter – You're No Dope: Let Me Save You
- Jeanne McGahey – Street With People
- Rosalie Moore – Poem In 2 Scenes
- George Elliott – The Red Battery
- George Leite – Toward A Technique Of Rule
- Josephine Miles – Four Poems
- Joseph Van Auker – Pirandello In Chains
- Lawrence Hart – The Map Of The Country

=== Number two, 1944 ===
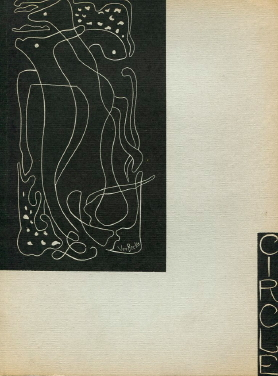
Cover of second issue, 1944

- Henry Miller – To Anaïs Nin Regarding One Of Her Books
- Glen Coffield – Two Poems
- William Everson – Two War Elegies
- R. H. Barlow – Four Poems
- Bern Porter – Letter To Gabene
- W. Edwin Ver Becke – Four Line Prints
- C.F. MacIntyre – Rilke And The Lost God
- Dean Jeffries – Three Poems
- William Carlos Williams – To The Dean
- George Leite – To Henry Miller
- Philip Lamantia – Two Poems
- Shaemus Keilty – Quinquin

=== Number three, 1944 ===
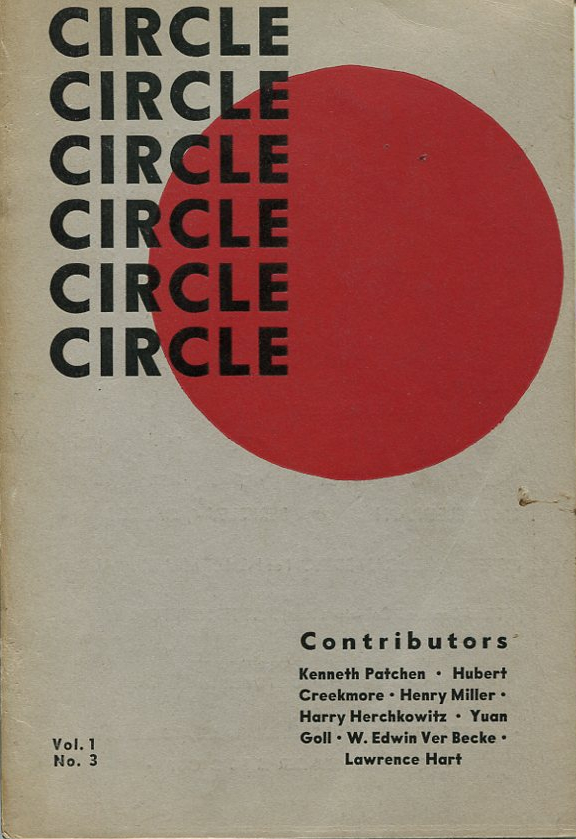
Cover of third issue, 1944

- Harry Hershkowitz – The Bulbul Birds
- Kenneth Patchen – Four Poems
- W. Edwin Ver Becke – The Father
- Yvan Goll – Histoire De Parmenia L'Havanaise
- Thomas Parkinson – Morning Passage
- George Elliott – Two Poems
- Douglas MacAgy – Palimpsest
- Pvt. Leonard Wolf – Two Poems
- Hamilton Tyler – Mr. Eliot And Mr. Milton
- Jackson Burke – Poem
- Pvt. J. C. Crews – Poem
- M. Wheelan Grote – First Impression Of College
- Lt (jg) Hubert Creekmore – Two Poems
- Marie Wells – Two Poems
- Lawrence Hart – About Marie Wells
- Robert Lottick – Poem
- Wendel Anderson – Poem
- Kenneth Rexroth – Les Lauriers Sont Coupés

=== Number four, 1944 ===
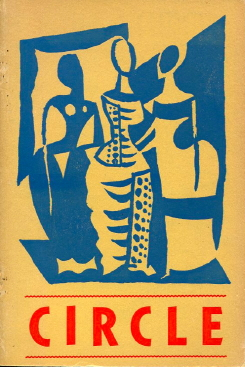
Cover of fourth issue, 1944

- Anaïs Nin – The All-Seeing
- Theodore Schroeder – Where Is Obscenity?
- Arthur Ginzel – Four
- Walter Fowlie – The Two Creators
- George Leite – Low Darkened Shelter
- Henry Miller – Varda: The Master Builder
- Lee Ver Duft – Poems
- Herbert Cahoon – Marley And The Gemini
- Lt. Joseph Stanley Pennell – Two Poems
- Bern Porter – All Over The Place
- James Franklin Lewis – To John Wheelwright
- Forrest Anderson – Sea Poems
- Warren d'Azevedo – Deep Six For Danny
- Lt. Robert L. Dark – Two poems
- Kenneth Rexroth – Les Lauriers Sont Coupés

=== Number five, 1945 ===
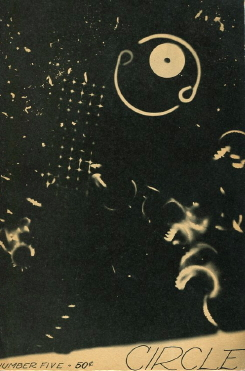
Cover of fifth issue, 1945

- Weldon Kees – The Purcells
- E. E. Cummings – Five Poems
- Dane Rudhyar – Neptune, Evocator Extraordinary
- Jess Cloud – Three Portraits
- Henri Hell – Max Jacob
- Douglas MacAgy – Clay Spohn's War Machines
- Henry Miller – Preface For The Power Within Us
- Aline Musyl – Four Little Poems
- Albert Clements – Rain
- Alfred Young Fisher – Voltas For Fugues
- George Leite & Bern Porter – Photo-poems
- Frederic Ramsey, Jr. – Artist's Life
- Nicholas Moore – A Poem & A Story
- Marguerite Martin – First Pity
- Paul Radin – Journey Of The Soul
- Max Harris – Two Poems

=== Number six, 1945 ===
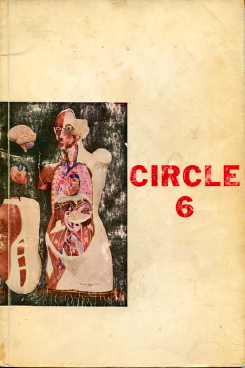
Cover of sixth issue, 1945

- Lawrence Hart – Some Elements Of Active Poetry
- Rosalie Moore – Letter To Camp Orford, Poem In Two Scenes, text
- R. H. Barlow – Framed Portent, Table Set For Sea Slime, text
- Marie Wells – Death At Noon, Monody In One, text
- Jeanne McGahey – Road To Chicago, text
- Alfred Morang – Darling Sister And The Pound Of Liver
- Haldeen Brady - Whirl
- Henry Miller – Knud Merrild: A Holiday In Paint
- Robert Barlow – Tepuzteca, Tepehua
- James Laughlin – Poem In 38 Lines
- Thomas Parkinson – John Works On A Figure Of Virginia, Carving It
- Harry Roskolenko – Return, The Expert
- Eugene Gramm – A Gallery Of Americans
- Maude Phelps Hutchins – Soliloquy At Dinner
- Alex Comfort – The Soldiers
- William Pillin – My Reply As A Jew
- Leonora Carrington – Flannel Night Shirt
- Richard O. Moore – Villanelle 1, Villanelle 2
- Kenneth Rexroth – Les Lauriers Sont Coupés

=== Numbers seven and eight, 1946 ===
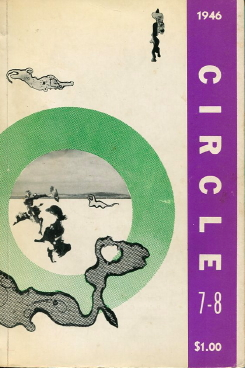
Cover of seventh and eighth issue, 1946

- Robert Duncan – The Years As Catches
- Ian Hugo – Two Block Prints
- Anaïs Nin – Hedja
- Hamilton Tyler – Finnegan Epic
- Bern Porter – Map Of Joyce's Life
- Lindley Williams Hubbell Jacques Vache
- Kenneth Patchen – Sleepers Awake
- Thomas Hughes Ingle – Tattooed Sailor
- Kenneth O. Hanson – Falstaff And The Chinese Poet
- Douglas MacAgy – Without Horizon
- James McCray – Four Paintings
- Yvan Goll – The Magic Circle
- Brewster Ghiselin – Concert In Dorse
- Charlotte Marletto – Oblique Epitome
- A. M. Klein – In Memoriam
- Thomas Parkinson – Letter To A Young Lady
- Howard O'Hagan – The Colony
- Edmund de Coligny – The Poem Of The Two Oscars
- Robert Barlow – Angel Hernandez, Artist
- George Leite & Bern Porter – Two Photo-poems
- Edwin Ver Becke – A Line Drawing And A Story, The Tryst
- Gil Orovitz – Flamenco
- Shaun FitzSimon – Easter Bells
- Roger Pryor Dodge – A Non-esthetic Basis For The Dance
- Alex Austin – Civilization
- Oscar Williams – The Lemmings
- Paul Radin – Three Conversions
- Osmond Beckwith – Fire Sale
- Warren D' Azevedo – Blue Peter
- Darius Milhaud – French Music Between Two Wars
- George Barrows – Creative Photography
- W. S. Graham – Three Poems
- Eithene Wilkins – Two Poems
- Jack Jones – A Story, A Poem
- Samuel Holmes – The Death Of An Innocent
- James Steel Smith – Murder And Complacency
- Georges Henein – There Are No Pointless Jests
- Martin H. Mack – It All Depends On How You Want It
- David Cornel DeJong – Three Poems
- Henry Miller – Three Books Tangent To Circle

=== Number nine, 1946 ===
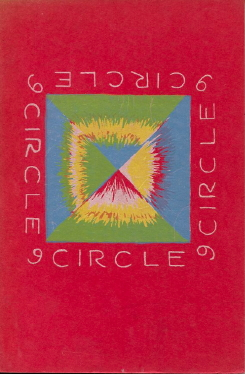
Cover of ninth issue, one of four variants, 1946

- Bezalel Schatz – Cover art
- Lawrence Durrell – Eight Aspects Of Melissa
- Gerald Burke – Essay On Children
- Richard O. Moore – A History Primer
- Jim Fitzsimmons – Four Experimental Nudes
- David Stuart – The Inflammable Angel Kezia
- C. F. MacIntyre – The Ars Poetica Of Paul Valery
- William Everson – The Release
- A. Seixas – Ellwood Graham
- George Leite – The Wing: The Mirror
- Alexis Comfort – Taras And The Snowfield
- Walker Winslow – NP Ward
- Hilaire Hiler – Manifesto Of Psychromatic Design
- Harold Norse – Three Poems
- Robert Wosniak – The Man In The Cape
- Robert Stock – Triumphal Arch
- Ericka Braun – Oath Of The Tennis Court
- Max Harris – Revolutionary Poem
- Mary Fabilli – The Memorable Hospital
- Will Gibson – Poem For Three
- Selwyn Schwartz – Four Poems
- Ernst Kaiser – The Development From Surrealism
- Richard Lyons – A Note To Kenneth Patchen
- Byron Vazakas – Two Poems
- Henry Miller – Rimbaud Opus (Part Two)
- Harry Roskolenko – PR, The Portable Review

=== Number ten, 1948 ===
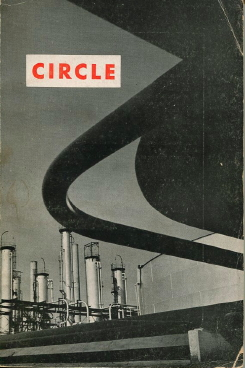
Cover of tenth issue, 1948

- John Whitney & James Whitney – Audio-Visual Music
- Joseph Stanley Pennell – Logistics
- Mary Fabilli – The Boss
- Giuseppe Ungaretti – Eight Poems
- Antony Borrow – The Great Refusal
- Douglas MacAgy – A Margin Of Chaos
- Charles Howard – The Bride
- Harry Partch – Show-horses In The Concert Ring
- Robert Barlow – The Malinche Of Acacingo
- Alex Comfort – Two Enemies Of Society
- D. Rentis – Forward
- Attile Joseph – Two Poems
- Clarisse Blazek – Poet In Hungary
- George Elliott – Story
- Luis J. Trinkaus – Eight Inches Of Snow
- Kendrick Smithyman – Legends Of The Gunner And His Girl
- Warren D'Azevedo – Shuttle
- Robert Duncan – Toward An African Elegy
- Jody Scott & George Leite — Admission of Fission
