= Maxim Lieber =

American literary agent

- Born: October 15, 1897; Warsaw, Congress Poland
- Died: April 10, 1993 (aged 95); East Hartford, Connecticut
- Occupations: literary agent, book publishing, spy
- Spouse(s): Irma Cohen (first), Sally Tannenbaum (second), Minna Zelinka Lieber (third)
- Children: three
- Espionage activity
- Allegiance: Soviet Union
- Service branch: espionage
- Service years: 1930s, 1940s
- Codename: Paul
- Codename: Roland F. Kapp (?)
- Other work: Maxim Lieberman

Maxim Lieber (October 15, 1897 – April 10, 1993) was an American literary agent in New York City during the 1930s and 1940s. The Soviet spy Whittaker Chambers named him as an accomplice in 1949, and Lieber fled first to Mexico and then Poland not long after Alger Hiss's conviction in 1950.

== Background ==
Maxim Lieber was born on October 15, 1897, in Warsaw, then Congress Poland, to a family of Jewish origin. Both parents came from Opoczno, Poland. His family left Hamburg, Germany for New York City aboard the S. S. Pennsylvania in 1907 and lived in the Bronx. Lieber's father served as a typesetter for the Yiddish social-democratic newspaper The Jewish Daily Forward, suggesting that one parent (if not both) was secularist. Young Maxim attended public schools, including Townsend Harris Hall (then part of New York City College) and Morris High School (Bronx, New York).

== Career ==
In 1918, Lieber joined the West Ontario Regiment of the Canadian Over-Seas Expeditionary Force. In 1919, he enlisted in the U.S. Army Medical Corps. In 1920, he received an honorable discharge as a Sergeant. (In 1951, Lieber testified that he had served in World War I, stationed at Camp Meade in the replacement battalion in medical service, that he received U. S. naturalization in Washington in 1919, and that he left the U.S. Army as a sergeant in the Army Medical Corp at Walter Reed Hospital.)

=== Literary agency ===
After serving in the Army, Lieber helped set up a publishing house, Lieber & Lewis (which Albert Boni took over in 1923). He co-edited a book, published in 1925, and then traveled abroad using the advance paid him by the publisher (R. M. McBride). Returning to the States in 1926, he worked for Brentano's as head of publishing through 1930. At that point, Brentano's went into involuntary bankruptcy.

In 1930 Lieber set up the Maxim Lieber Literary Agency. Over the next 20 years, he would represent some 30 clients. In 1931, his office address (advertised in New Masses magazine) was "55 West 42nd St., New York" and telephone Penn. 6-6179."

==== Clients ====
According to one writer (and client), Lieber's client list included Louis Adamic, Erskine Caldwell, Katherine Anne Porter, John Cheever, Josephine Herbst, Albert Maltz, John O'Hara, Albert Halper, James Farrell, Nathanael West, Maxim Gorky, Theodore Dreiser, and Langston Hughes.

Other clients included Thomas Wolfe, Allen Tate, Saul Bellow, Carson McCullers, Claude McKay, Otto Katz (as "Andre Simon") and Egon Kisch, Carey McWilliams and Robert Coates, and Alma Mailman (wife first of James Agee and then Bodo Uhse) and Anna Seghers and Ludwig Renn, John Wexley, E. P. O'Donnell, Walker Winslow, and Tom Kromer. Another client was Phillip Bonosky, who wrote a biography of Detroit-based communist leader Bill McKee.

The New York Public Library may have the most complete list (with years represented):

- Louis Adamic (1930–1931, 1946)
- Benjamin Appel (1933, 1935)
- Nathan Asch (1934–1936, 1940–1942, 1946–1947, 1949–1950)
- Arturo Barea (1947, 1950)
- Saul Bellow (1943)
- Alvah Bessie (1933)
- Carlos Bulosan (1944)
- Erskine Caldwell (1932–1943, 1947–1948)
- John Cheever (1935–1941)
- Robert Coates (1935–1938, 1941, 1945)
- David de Jong (undated)
- Daniel Fuchs (undated)
- Emily Hahn (1930–1931)
- Nancy Hale (1934)
- Albert Halper (1935, 1937, 1942–1943, 1946–1950)
- Langston Hughes (1933–1945, 1949–1950)
- Alfred Kreymborg (1947)
- Grace Lumpkin (1935)
- Carson McCullers (1938, 1941, 1948–1949)
- Bernard Malamud (1942, 1945)
- William March (W. E. Campbell) (1934, 1937–1939)
- Naomi Mitchison (1935)
- Frances Park (1932–1934)
- Leo C. Rosten (1935–1938)
- Tess Slesinger (1933–1937, 1941)
- Henry Anton Steig (1937–1941)
- Nathanael West (1933)
- Thomas Wolfe (1934)
- Leane Zugsmith (1933–1944, 1947–1949, 1951)

A Lieber family source adds these further clients: Joseph Milton Bernstein, Whittaker Chambers, Havelock Ellis, Albert Malkin, Lewis Mumford, Arthur Simmons, and Richard Wright; and possibly Maurice Halperin, Lillian Hellman, and Leon Trotsky.

==== Staff ====
Elizabeth Nowell, who went on to become Thomas Wolfe's agent later, got her start as an agent with Lieber as early as 1933. Other authors with whom she dealt include: Alvah Bessie, Daniel Fuchs, David de Jong, and Nancy Hale. By February 1935, she had left to form her own agency.

Sally Tanenbaum headed plays for Lieber by January 1936: "Maxim Lieber, literary agent, has placed Sally Tanenbaum, formerly with the play reading department of the Theatre Guild and M-G-M, in charge of his play department".

=== Espionage ===
J. Peters introduced Lieber to Whittaker Chambers in late 1934. The two became friends, and Chambers often used Lieber's apartment when visiting New York. Chambers wrote of Lieber (using his alias "Paul"):

After the Alger Hisses, Paul, of all the people in the underground, had been closest to me. In many ways our relationship was freer than mine with the Hisses. Paul was engaged in less hazardous activities than Hiss. He had a lively sense of humor which Hiss lacked. We shared a common intense love of music and books. And Paul knew my real name and had known and respected me as a Communist writer before either of us went underground.

According to Chambers in his 1952 memoir Witness, Lieber helped the underground network in New York City. Initially, Chambers secured Lieber's cooperation in setting up a branch of his agency in London, which Chambers would run under the name of "David Breen." Then, he secured Lieber's support for operations in East Asia. During the summer of 1935, the Chambers family lived with the Liebers in Smithtown, Pennsylvania. After Chambers' defection in 1938, Peters used "Paul" (Lieber) to contact him. Later, when Chambers wanted to let Peters & Co. know about his life preserver (see Pumpkin Papers), he contacted Lieber to relay his message. While the London operation was getting under way (it would eventually fall through), Chambers asked Lieber to cooperate with fellow underground operator John Loomis Sherman (under the alias "Charles Francis Chase" and Chambers as "Lloyd Cantwell") in establishing the American Feature Writers' Syndicate.

Together, these three filed a registration of trade in New York City and opened a bank account at the Chemical Bank. (Chambers also mentioned that Charles Angoff was involved, though conspiratorially or otherwise remained unclear. He also mentions Japanese artist Hideo Noda/野田英夫.) Sherman was to go to Tokyo and set up a network separate from that of Richard Sorge. According to Chambers' testimony:

Lieber went among various feature syndicates and various newspapers and tried to get various interests or sales ... and Sherman went to work in Lieber's office, had a desk there, and his name was written on the door and I think some stationery was got out and deposits were made, I think, in the Chemical Bank in New York in the name of the syndicate. These deposits were to finance the operation in Japan. Then Peters, who was in on most of this operation, supplied a birth certificate in the name of Charles Chase [for Sherman] and, on the basis of that certificate, which was a perfectly legal document procured in the way I have described in earlier testimony, John Sherman took out a passport and on that passport he traveled to Tokyo.

=== Testimony, flight, and later years ===
In 1949, J. Peters left the United States at his own volition (ahead of near-certain deportation) for Hungary, where he lived for the rest of his life. Shortly thereafter, Noel Field (like Hiss not only as an employee of the U.S. Department of State, but one named by Chambers as part of his spy ring) fled from Switzerland to Poland (behind the Iron Curtain). This left House Un-American Committee (HUAC) with few people who had not yet pleaded the Fifth to corroborate Chambers' story. On February 27 and March 1, 1950, Sherman appeared before HUAC without counsel and pleaded the Fifth to nearly every question asked him.

On June 13, 1950, Lieber appeared with lawyer Milton H. Friedman (brother-in-law of New York State Justice Philip M. Halpern) before HUAC during executive session with House representatives Francis E. Walter, Burr P. Harrison, and Morgan M. Moulder. As with Sherman, HUAC read out excerpts from Chambers' testimony that mentioned their names or aliases. They also asked Lieber (as Sherman) whether he knew either Alger Hiss or J. Peters. (Chambers had recounted a meeting between, Lieber, himself, and Hiss on Lieber's farm: Lieber confirmed only ownership of 103-acre farm in Ferndale, Pennsylvania, in Bucks County from about 1935-1945.) They asked whether his clients included Louis Adamic, Howard Fast, V. J. Jerome, or Paul Robeson. They asked whether he knew Otto Katz (reputed to be involved in the death of Walter Krivitsky and in Soviet attempts to seize Chambers after defection) or Katz's associate Erwin Kisch. They asked whether he knew Osmond K. Fraenkel or whether he had ever contributed to a publication (probably Freies Deutschland) by Anna Seghers in Mexico. To all such questions, Lieber pleaded the Fifth on the grounds of self-incrimination. As he explained, he had also testified twice already in 1948 before the grand jury in New York City, which then indicted Hiss on two counts of perjury. During testimony, Lieber listed three by name of some 30 clients: Erskine Caldwell, Carey McWilliams, and Robert Coates.

Lieber left the U. S. for Mexico in 1951 with his wife Minna and their two children.

After one year in Cuernavaca, Mexico, they moved to Mexico City, where they resided another two years. Following his departure from the US, Lieber was stripped of his US citizenship. He resided in Mexico as a stateless person. The US authorities returned his citizenship in 1964.

In late 1954, on instructions from Moscow, Lieber moved with his family to Warsaw, Poland. They spent the next 14 years in Poland. Professor Erwin Marquit knew the Liebers in Poland and recollects:

A few weeks after our arrival in Poland, we began to encounter in the Hotel Bristol a number of U.S. Communist emigres. Although Esther and I had not known any of them personally in the United States, they quickly accepted us into what was to become a community of some dozen U.S. Communists in Poland ... Max, a naturalized U.S. citizen, had been a literary agent, whose clients included, among others, Whittaker Chambers, of Pumpkin Papers fame ... The Liebers said that they had left the United States because Max had been stripped of the possibility of earning a livelihood ... Although I had some sporadic contact with them, the Liebers rarely attended gatherings of the American group.

In August 1968 they left for the United Kingdom, from where they were expelled by the British Home Office three months later.

The Liebers then returned to the States. There, Lieber lived out the rest of his life quietly in East Hartford, Connecticut. Soon after his return to the US he was interviewed by the FBI. In the late 1970s, Lieber gave a series of interviews to historian Allen Weinstein, who then was working on his book, "Perjury: The Hiss-Chambers Case."

== Personal life and death ==
In 1924, Lieber married to Irma Cohen, with whom he had one son and whom he divorced by 1933. He married Sally Tanenbaum in May 1936, whom he divorced before 1939. (The marriage though not the dates were corroborated by Whittaker Chambers and his wife during questioning by the FBI in 1951.) Minna Edith Zelinka was a co-respondent in the second divorce; Lieber married her before 1939. They had two children.

Maxim Lieber died age 95 in East Hartford, Connecticut on April 10, 1993.

== Impact on McCarthy era ==
Lieber's flight abroad in 1951, following Peters, Field, and others, left the U. S. Government with few witnesses to corroborate Chambers' testimony about Hiss. A second trial had found Hiss guilty of two counts of perjury a few months earlier, in January 1950. Witnesses included Hede Massing and a former housemaid.

(In 1952, Nathaniel Weyl would testify further about Hiss.)

== Publications ==
Lieber told HUAC, "Prior to that I had edited a book, an anthology of short stories, which I am happy to say is in the Library of Congress. "

- Great short stories of the world; an anthology selected from the literatures of all periods and countries, edited by Barrett H. Clark and Maxim Lieber (New York: R. M. McBride & Company, 1925)
- The Shape of Sarmatian Ideology in Poland by Stanisław Cynarski and Maxim Lieber (Polska Akademia Nauk.: Komitet Nauk Historycznych, 1968)

== See also ==
=== Clients ===
- Louis Adamic
- Erskine Caldwell
- Katherine Anne Porter
- John Cheever
- Josephine Herbst
- Albert Maltz
- John O'Hara
- Albert Halper
- James Farrell
- Nathanael West
- Maxim Gorky
- Theodore Dreiser
- Langston Hughes
- Tom Kromer

=== Books Published By Lieber & Lewis ===
==== 1922 ====
- Against the Grain by Joris Karl Huysmans, translated by John Howard, with an Introduction by Havelock Ellis
- Calvary by Octave Mirbeau, translated Louis Rich
- Chameleon: Being the Book of My Selves by Benjamin De Casseres
- Mr. Anthiphilos, Satyr by Remy de Gourmont, translated by John Howard, with an Introduction by Jack Lewis
- Stage Folk: A Book of Caricatures by Alfred Joseph Frueh

==== 1923 ====
- Axel by Villiers de l'Isle Adam
- Bizarre by Alexander Lawton Mackall, illustrated by Lauren Stout
- Blindfold by Orrick Johns
- Cables of Cobweb by Paul Jordan Smith
- Calidus Juventa by Allen Tate
- The Eleventh Virgin by Dorothy Day
- Goha the Fool by Albert Ades and Albert Josipovici, with a preface by Octave Mirbeau. Translated by Morris
- The Hat of Destiny by T. P. Connor
- The Love-Rogue: A Poetic Drama in Three Acts by Tirso de Molina, Transmuted from the Spanish Harry Kemp Colman
- Memoirs of Jacques Casanova (2 vol.), edited by Kenne Wallis
- On Strange Altars by Paul Jordan-Smith
- One Little Boy by Hugh de Sélincourt
- Our Dead Selves by Paul Eldridge
- Piri and I by Lawrence Vail
- Personality of Plants by Royal Dixon and Franklin Everett Fitch
- A Sheaf From Lermontov by Mikhail Lermontov; edited by J. J. Robbins, J. J.
- The Street of Queer Houses by Vernon Knowles

=== Espionage ===
- Whittaker Chambers
- Alger Hiss
- J. Peters
- Noel Field
- Hede Massing
- Nathaniel Weyl
- espionage
- Communism
- HUAC

== Primary sources ==
- "Hearings regarding Communist Espionage: hearings before the Committee on Un-American Activities, House of Representatives, Eighty-first Congress, first and second session". Internet Archive.
- Chambers, Whittaker (1952). Witness. New York: Random House. LCCN 52005149.
- Halper, Albert (1970). Good-bye, Union Square. Quadrangle Books. ISBN 0812901509.
- Sacco, Anthony J. (2004). Little Sister Lost. iUniverse. ISBN 0-595-33141-6.
- Sakymster, Thomas (2011). Red Conspirator: J. Peters and the American Communist Underground. Rutgers, NJ: Rutgers University Press. pp. 79, 84, 110, 213 fn57. LCCN 52005149.
