= Daliel's Gallery =

Former gallery and bookstore in California

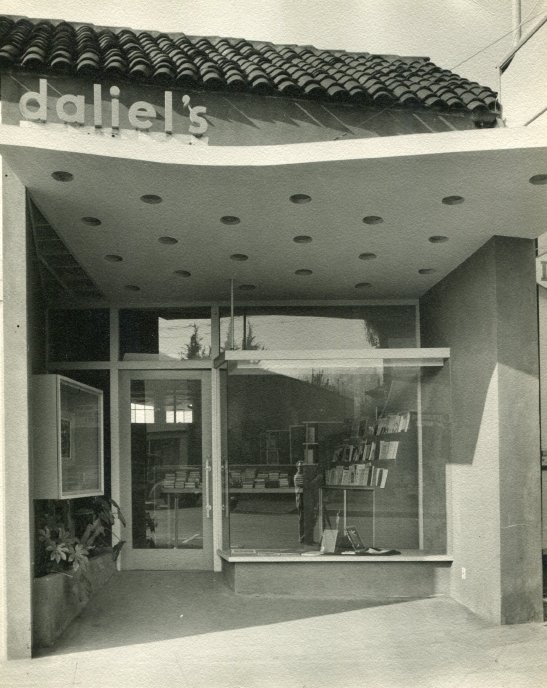
Front of Daliel's Bookstore and Gallery in Berkeley, California, 1946

Daliel's Gallery (stylized in all lowercase, and sometimes just 'daliel') was a display and performance space in the San Francisco Bay Area in California in the 1940s and 1950s; the building also contained Daliel's Bookstore. George Leite opened Daliel's at 2466 Telegraph Avenue between Dwight and Haste Streets in Berkeley, as a combination bookstore and art gallery in 1945, naming both after a half-brother in Portugal he had never met, Dalael Leite.

The bookstore was also the home of Circle Magazine and Circle Editions, the publishing ventures Leite established at the same time.

Artists featured in the gallery included painters, sculptors and printmakers, as well as jewellers, musicians, and modern dancers. These included painter Zahara Schatz, jazz musician Dave Brubeck from Concord, sculptor Jean Varda, and jeweler Peter Macchiarini. One show in 1950 was by a group of nuns from Oregon who had been taught in a summer class at their college by Jean Varda. The store closed in 1952 several years after the magazine ceased publication.

== Notable artists exhibited ==
- Chiura Obata – water colors
- Dave Brubeck – jazz chamber music
- David Park (painter) – paintings
- Elmer Bischoff – paintings
- Eugene Berman Berman Brothers – paintings
- George Albert Harris – paintings
- Jean Varda – mosaics and collages
- Man Ray – photographs
- Marc Chagall – prints
- Peter Macchiarini – jewelry
- Robert P. McChesney – drawings and paintings
- Zahara Schatz – plastic laminations and paintings
