= Louisiana Diary =

Louisiana Diary is a documentary film produced and directed by KQED (TV)'s Richard O. Moore for National Educational Television in 1963. It was first aired in 1964. Copyright to this film is held by Public Broadcasting Service TV station WNET, based in New York City.

It follows the Congress of Racial Equality (CORE) from July to August 1963, as they undertake an African American voter registration drive in the town of Plaquemine, Louisiana (Iberville Parish). The film includes scenes of citizens undergoing mock interrogations at voter education clinics; CORE members canvassing from house to house; civil rights meetings in Baptist Churches; a mass march and vigil; police tear gassing crowds and making arrests; interviews with Ronnie Moore (Field Secretary for CORE in Louisiana) and Mama Joe Homes; a speech by James Farmer (National Secretary of CORE), and views of a Plaquemine contingent getting on a bus heading for the August 28th 1963 March on Washington. Narrated by Moore, the film adds a postscript that on October 17, 1963, Reverend Joseph Carter became the first African American who successfully registered to vote in West Feliciana Parish, Louisiana.

The film captures all the aspects of the civil rights struggle in the South. The documentary covers the eight parishes that make up the largest part of Louisiana's sixth district: Iberville, East Baton Rouge, West Baton Rouge, Point Coupee, St. Helena, Tangipahoa, East Feliciana, and West Feliciana. Iberville is the film's focal point.

A 16mm answer film print of Louisiana Diary was digitally restored in 2011 by the San Francisco Bay Area Television Archive, which was loaned to them by Moore. The Amistad Research Center at Tulane University in New Orleans also preserves a 16mm film print of this film.

== See also ==
- Civil rights movement in popular culture
