= Circle Editions =

American publishing company

George Leite began Circle Editions in 1945 as an outgrowth of Circle Magazine, which was published from his Berkeley, California bookstore and gallery, daliel's (stylized with lowercase 'd'). Producing avant-garde, experimental work, the volumes included pamphlets, hardbound books, and two phonograph recordings by creative talents such as Henry Miller, Lawrence Hart (poet), Lawrence Durrell, Albert Cossery, Harry Partch and others. More editions were planned, but with the suspension of publication of Circle Magazine after Issue 10 in 1948, and the later closure of daliel's in 1952, the enterprise ended.

Lawrence Hart (poet) group

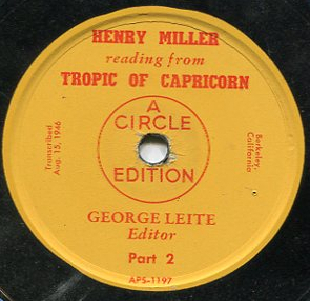
Henry Miller reading Tropic of Capricorn

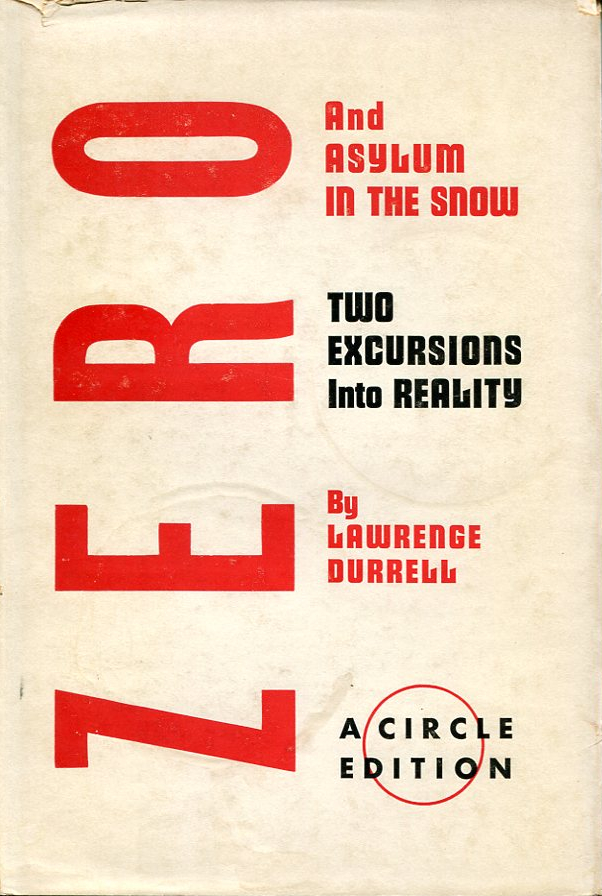
Lawrence Durrell's Excursions into Reality
