= Richard O. Moore =

American poet

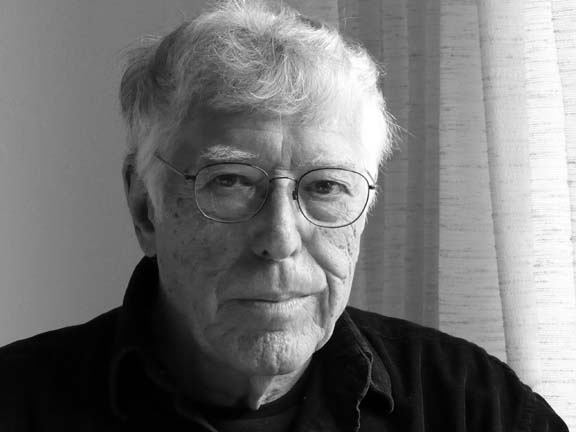
Moore in 2009

Richard O. Moore (February 26, 1920 – March 25, 2015) was an American poet associated with Kenneth Rexroth and the San Francisco Renaissance.

His earliest poetry was published in 1945 in Circle Magazine by George Leite. In 1949 he was one of the founders of KPFA, the first listener-supported public radio station in the United States. He continued to write poetry, but seldom sought to publish. Over the next fifty years he was active as a documentary filmmaker and public television executive, at KQED, San Francisco and KTCA, Minneapolis-Saint Paul.

Upon retirement in 2000, Moore returned full-time to poetry. Writing the Silences edited by Brenda Hillman and Paul Ebenkamp, includes a selection of his poetry from 1946–2008.

== Biography ==
Richard Owen Moore was the only child of Harold Ellsworth Moore and Frances Elizabeth (née) Flinn. A new house, in an upscale neighborhood promised a prosperous future; it was an illusion. For the Moore family, the Wall Street crash of 1929 transformed the American dream into nightmare. Bewilderment, bitterness, and illness replaced the optimism that fueled the American dream. Subsequent years living with relatives brought increasing isolation and a near absolute sense of impermanence.

In 1934 the family joined the western diaspora in search of a healthier climate and the possibility of a job. Four years later, Frances Elizabeth Flinn Moore died of Tuberculosis and her son, by then a teenager and a writer of wistful poetry, lost all trust in God and State. He became determined to make his own way free of family and of any and all allegiances. Berkeley and the University of California was the obvious place to start.

Once at Berkeley, Moore announced that "poetry is my vocation." With a friend, Thomas Parkinson, he enrolled in Josephine Miles' class in poetry. He also became a regular at Kenneth Rexroth's informal sessions on poetry, pacifism, and philosophical anarchism. He became a leader of anti-war demonstrations at Sather Gate and for a short while the editor of the Berkeley student literary magazine.

This period came to an abrupt end when he was expelled from the university for failure to complete courses for an entire semester. Again, he found himself alone. Overnight his supposedly pacifist friends, members of "The Yanks Are Not Coming", became, following Germany's invasion of the Soviet Union, passionate supporters of the war. No longer at home in Berkeley, Moore moved to San Francisco, closer to the Rexroth circle and to a new and unexpected interest in modern dance. For several strenuous years Moore studied dance with May O'Donnell and José Limón. He continued to write poetry and became a counselor for young men seeking to apply for Conscientious Objector status.

At the end of World War II, Moore, together with Eleanor McKinney moved to Duncans Mills, a former lumber town on the Russian River. The idea was to live apart from the distractions of the city and most of all to write, study, and to live a meditative "near to nature" life. That dream came to an end when Eleanor, following Lewis Hill, and Richard, following Eleanor, moved back to Berkeley with the intent to begin a radio station devoted to the principles of nonviolence and pacifism.

Moore applied for and was granted readmission to the university. Other students in his class were Robert Duncan (whom Moore had known earlier through Pauline Kael) and Jack Spicer. The return to Berkeley coincided with the very infrequent publication of Moore's poetry, particularly in Circle Magazine.

On April 15, 1949, KPFA went on the air. The first three voices were: Ed Meece (chief engineer), Lewis Hill, and Richard Moore, presenter for the first program: Anglo-American Folk Ballads. During this period Moore retained his connection with the Rexroth circle, and it was he who persuaded Kenneth to undertake what became a celebrated series of ad lib monologues.

Moore left KPFA and Pacifica Foundation in 1952 but in 1954 returned to broadcasting, this time in television as an early staff member of KQED in San Francisco. He became the station's Director of Public Affairs. In 1960 he received a CBS Fellowship for a year's study at Columbia University, during which time he took classes in linguistic philosophy and began his reading of Ludwig Wittgenstein. It would be accurate to say that Rexroth and Wittgenstein are the two major influences on Moore's poetry. They have little or nothing in common, which may explain the persistence of contradiction and radical doubt found in so much of Moore's poetry.

Moore returned to KQED in 1961 with the aim of producing documentary films for national public television using recently discovered cinema verite techniques. For the next eight years Moore and his film unit produced an astonishing number of documentaries in current affairs, literature, art, and music. From 1968 to the 1980s, Moore produced television programs for both KQED and his own PTV Inc., and in 1981 joined the staff of KTCA in Minneapolis-St. Paul as head of Special Projects. The decade of the eighties marks one of Moore's more productive periods. It was during this time that he completed, but did not submit for publication, "Ten Philosophical Asides," "This Morning," and most importantly the nine short poems that make up the sequence, "Holding On." In 1990 Moore retired with the objective of, as he told reporters, "returning full time to poetry."

In retirement with his wife, Ruth Moore, in a family-built house near Point Arena on the Northern California coast, Moore began to assemble poems from five decades, and in the process kindled a reconnection with the literary world. At the Squaw Valley Writer's Conference, Moore met the poet Brenda Hillman, who encouraged him to submit his poems for publication. Moore's response was indifferent. In 1997 Ruth Moore died. Three years later Moore left Point Arena intending to settle at The Redwoods in Mill Valley. Not prepared for a retirement home, he soon accepted the invitation of a friend to visit Southern California. This detour brought him to Claremont, where he audited philosophy seminars on Wittgenstein given by the late D. Z. Phillips at Claremont Graduate University. At the urging of his children he returned in 2003 to The Redwoods. While still in Claremont he had renewed contact with Hillman. Finally out of patience with Moore's reluctance to publish, she suggested that they, with the help of one of her students, Paul Ebenkamp, edit a selection of poems. The editing took place at The Redwoods. "Writing the Silences" is the result.

A second volume, Particulars of Place, edited by Hillman, Ebenkamp, and Garrett Caples, with an introduction by Cedar Sigo, published April 2015 from Omnidawn and is largely composed of poems written after his first book. His poems have appeared in many literary journals, including Poetry, Volt, Redwood Coast Review, and Amerarcana. He also privately published a number of chapbooks including A Selection for Ruth (1997), China Diary (2012), Outcry (2014), and In Passing (2015).

== Poetry ==
"A Selection for Ruth" - 1997 – privately printed, not for sale.

"Writing the Silences" edited by Brenda Hillman and Paul Ebenkamp, University of California Press, Spring 2010

Although in 1949 Moore received the Emily Chamberlain Cook Prize in Poetry for the best unpublished verse submitted by an undergraduate, it appears not to have encouraged him to seek publication of his poems. The challenge of supporting a growing family, plus a continuing interest in radio and television programming, left little time for what he has described as "the secretarial work" of assembling and submitting poems to a publisher. Moore's media career covers fifty years, from KPFA in Berkeley in 1949 to his retirement from KTCA, Minneapolis-Saint Paul in 2000. Although the last eight years were spent as the CEO of Twin Cities Public Television he is probably best remembered as a filmmaker.

It is worth noting that two of Moore's precedent setting documentary series involved writers. USA: Poetry in 1965 featured the following poets: John Ashbery, Robert Creeley, Robert Duncan, William Everson, Allen Ginsberg, Kenneth Koch, Denise Levertov, Robert Lowell, Frank O'Hara, Charles Olson, Ed Sanders, Anne Sexton, Gary Snyder, John Wieners, Philip Whalen, Richard Wilbur, and Louis Zukoksky. In 1975, The Writer In America series included Robert Duncan (a second film), Janet Flanner, John Gardner, Ross Macdonald, Wright Morris, Toni Morrison, Muriel Rukeyser, and Eudora Welty.

As a filmmaker Moore's interests were not limited to writers. He secured the funding, produced, and directed documentaries on many subjects including the status of black youth in San Francisco; a film on Cuba and Fidel Castro; films on the photographer Dorothea Lange; a biography of Duke Ellington; a film with Merce Cunningham and John Cage; and a docudrama with Tom Wolfe.

== Filmography ==
Photography: The Incisive Art, with Ansel Adams (1960).

Louisiana Diary (documentary): a CORE voter registration drive in Plaquemine (1963).

Take This Hammer, with James Baldwin. (1964).

Anatomy of a Hit, with Vince Guaraldi (1964).

The Messenger from Violet Drive, with Elijah Muhammad. (1965).

Under these Trees. Dorthea Lange (1965). With Phil Greene.

The Closer for Me. Dorothea Lange (1965). With Phil Greene.

Report from Cuba (1966).

USA: Poetry, a series of ten films on American poets (1966).

Monterey Jazz Festival (1966).

Losing Just the Same (1966).

The Long Walk, the Navajo nation (1967). With Phil Greene

Duke Ellington, Love You Madly (1967).

A Concert of Sacred Music, Duke Ellington (1967).

California: the place for no story (1969). With director-cinema photographer Phil Greene

Assemblage: Merce Cunningham and John Cage, Ghirardelli Square (1968).

The Writer in America, a series of eight films with novelists, short story writers, and poets (1975).

Eudora Welty, a series of readings by Eudora Welty.

On Death and Dying, with Dr. Willard Gaylin, the KTCS series Hard Choices (1980).

The Cities of China, location director only. (1980).

Going Somewhere: the story of Route 66. KTCA (1982).

== Other media projects ==
National Center for Experiments in Television, directed by Brice Howard . . The San Francisco Mix, a series of films by young directors. T.E.A.C.H. directed by Don Roman and Cliff Roberts. TV production training for minorities. Alive from Off Center, KTCA series produced by John Schott.

== Media image ==
For a biographer Moore's practice of various professions can be confusing. Is he a poet, an ex-dancer, a radio and television voice and image, a filmmaker, a TV executive, a peace activist, a family man, a withdrawn loner? Perhaps the best answer is, "None of the above." Yet a single thread runs through all of Richard O. Moore's "incarnations:" he began as, has continued to be, and remains a poet. He is not an academic, a critic, nor can he be identified exclusively with any group of poets. There is an obvious irony in the fact that Moore's poetry would likely have disappeared without notice had it not been for the insistence of Brenda Hillman. When asked about this he agreed, but added, "You know, poetry is what had kept me going. It has saved my life."
