= Jeanne McGahey =

American poet

Jeanne McGahey (died 1995 or 1996) was an American poet published by George Leite in Circle Magazine in the 1940s. She married the poet Lawrence Hart in 1944; they were both members of the "Activist Group" of poets.
