= Jean Varda =

Turkish-born American painter (1893–1971)

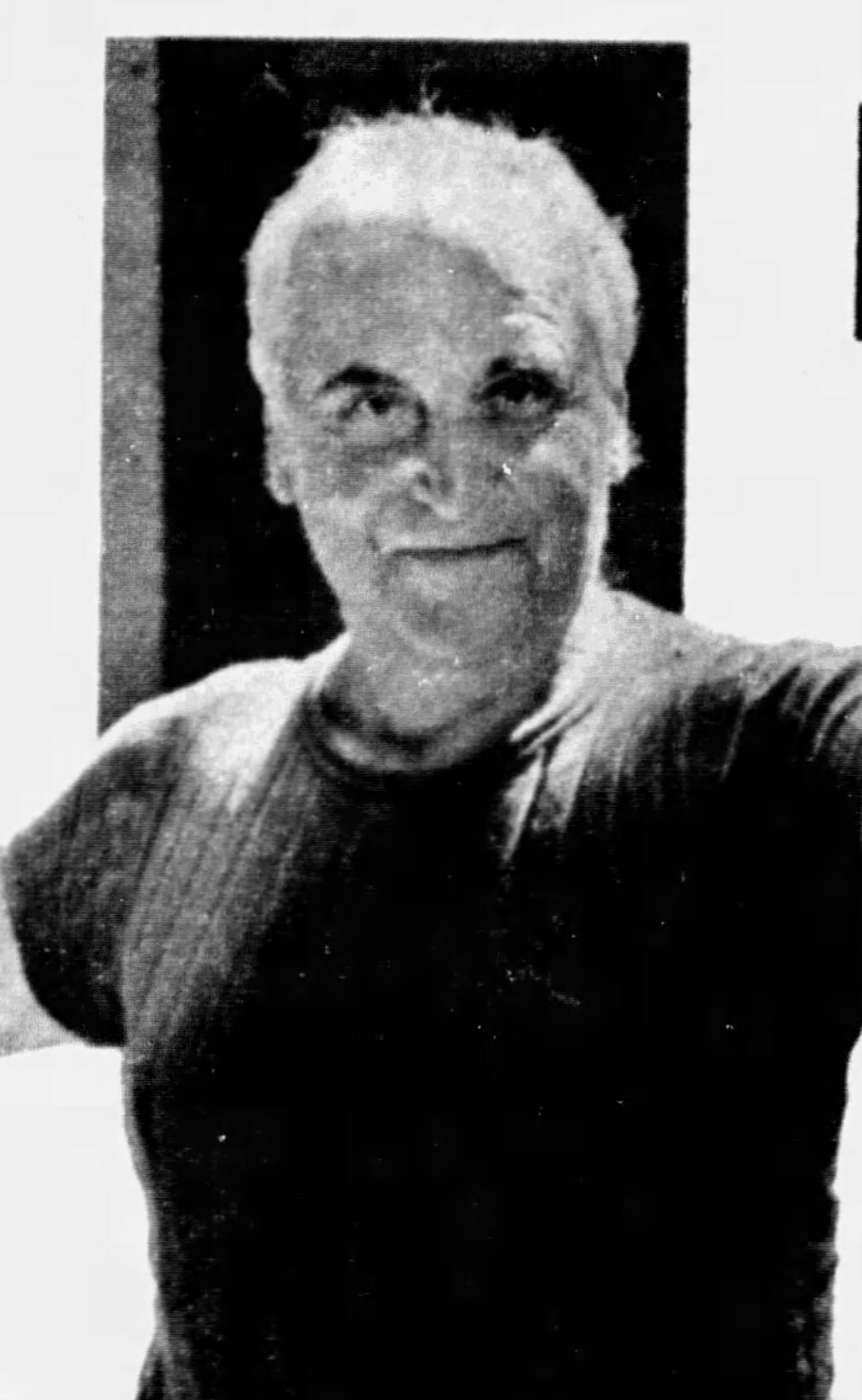
- Born: September 11, 1893; Smyrna, Ottoman Empire
- Died: January 10, 1971 (aged 77); Mexico City, Mexico
- Other name: Yanko Varda
- Known for: fine art, collage art, mosaic
- Style: Modernist
- Movement: Beat Generation
- Spouses: Dorothy Stewart, Virginia Barclay Goldstein, Chryssa Vardea Mavromichali
- Children: 1
- Relatives: Agnès Varda (cousin)
- Website: www.jeanyankovarda.com

Jean "Yanko" Varda (11 September 1893—10 January 1971) was a Turkish-born American artist, best known for his collage work. Varda was one of the early adopters of the Sausalito houseboat lifestyle that was popular in the 1960s–1970s. He was the subject of the short documentary, Uncle Yanco (1967), made by his cousin, Agnès Varda.

== Early life and education ==
Jean Varda was born on 11 September 1893 in Smyrna, Ottoman Empire (in present-day Izmir, Turkey). He was of mixed Greek and French descent. As a child he was known as a prodigy, and received commissions to paint portraits of prominent Athenians.

At age 19, Varda moved to Paris, where he met Picasso and Braque. He lost all interest in the academic style of painting he had been pursuing until that time. He moved to London during World War I, became a ballet dancer, and made friends with members of the avant garde in London.

== Career ==
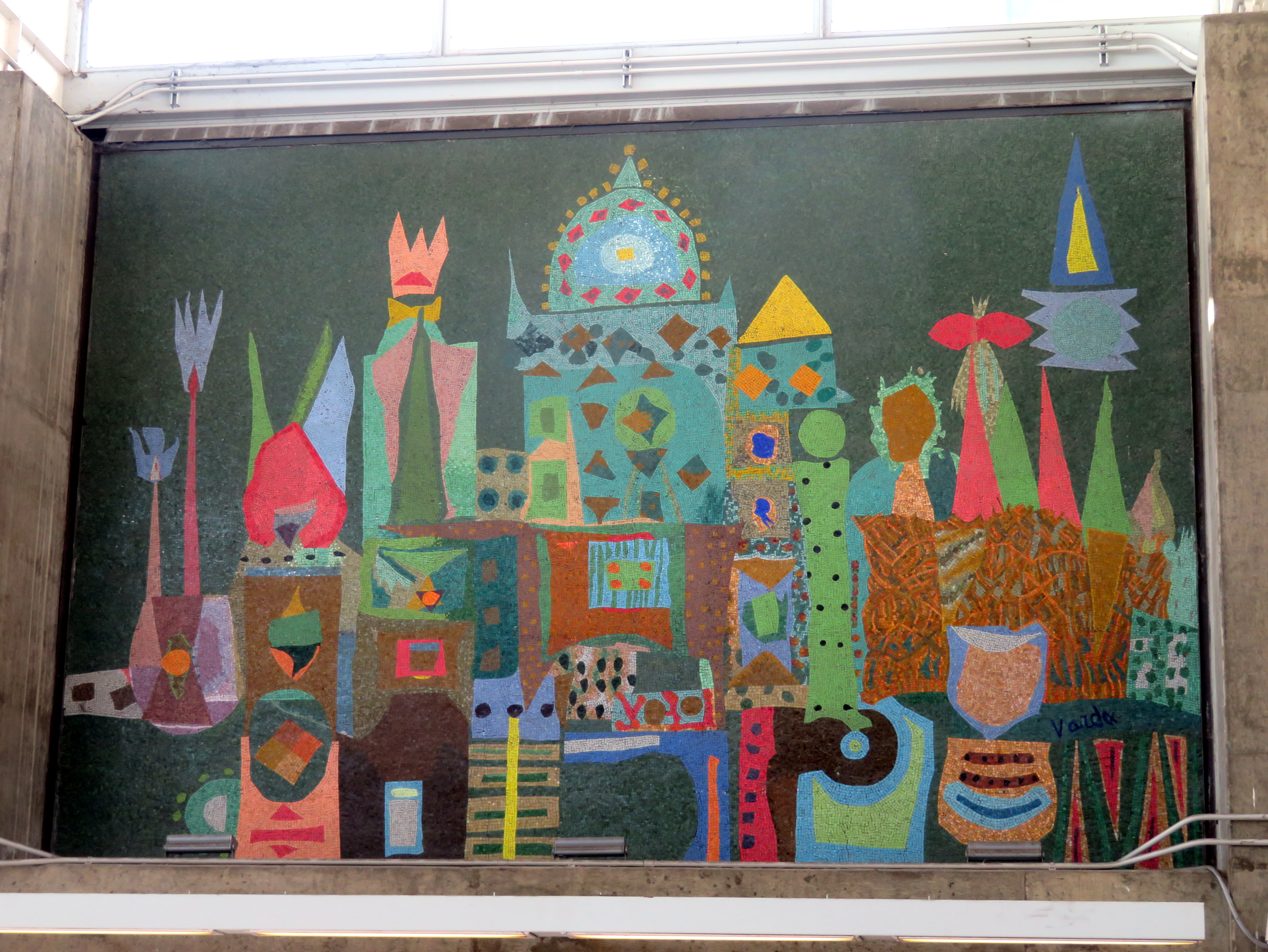
Tile mural by Jean Varda and Alfonso Pardiñas at Union City station, seen in January 2020.

=== Paris ===
By 1922, Varda returned to Paris and took up painting again. Beginning in 1923, he spent most of his summers in Cassis, in the south of France, sharing Roland Penrose's home Villa Les Mimosas, where they welcomed a number of well-known guests, including Braque, Miró, Derain, Max Ernst, Roger Fry, Clive Bell, Duncan Grant, Gerald Brenan, Wolfgang Paalen, and others. By the mid-1920s he spent most of his winters in London.

During the 1930s Varda developed a type of mosaic that involved the use of pieces of broken mirrors. He would scratch the backs of the pieces of mirror, then paint bright colors in the scratches so the paint showed through to the front of the mirror. He would then glue the pieces of mirror to a board, which he had prepared with a gritty gesso mixture.

=== Big Sur and Monterey ===
Varda exhibited his work in London and Paris before leaving for New York in 1939, where his work was exhibited at the Neumann-Willard Gallery. In 1940 he moved to Anderson Creek, in Big Sur, California, and after that to Monterey, about forty miles north of Big Sur. In late 1943, he persuaded the writer Henry Miller to move to Big Sur.

In 1944, Miller wrote an admiring profile of Varda called "Varda the Master Builder", which was published by Circle Magazine, an avant-garde art and literary magazine produced in Berkeley by George Leite. Through Henry Miller Varda met the writer Anaïs Nin. Varda and Nin became close friends and Nin would write about Varda frequently. Her novel Collages includes a slightly fictionalized profile of Varda, and his art appears on the first edition's cover. Nin's Silver Lake home was decorated with collages by Varda.

By 1943 Varda started shifting over to collages from his earlier mosaic/mirror pictures. The collage, which would typically combine scraps of cloth and bits of paper with paint on a board, would remain his favored medium for the rest of his life.

During the war years Varda's house in Monterey became a salon for artists, writers, and other creative people.

=== Teaching ===
In 1946 Varda taught at a Summer Institute at Black Mountain College, an experimental school in rural North Carolina. During the late 1940s and early 1950s Varda taught at the California School of Fine Arts (now the San Francisco Art Institute).

=== Sausalito ===
In approximately 1947, Varda and British-born artist Gordon Onslow Ford acquired an old ferryboat called the Vallejo. They permanently moored the Vallejo in Sausalito, across the Golden Gate Bridge from San Francisco. Using materials scavenged from a closed-down wartime shipbuilding operation, they remodeled the ferryboat into a studio for Onslow-Ford and a studio and living quarters for Varda. The writer and Zen Buddhist popularizer Alan Watts took over Onslow-Ford's space on the ferryboat in 1961.

Varda turned the Vallejo ferryboat into a kind of salon and he was an excellent cook and would regale guests with stories at dinners. His costume parties were famous. On Sunday afternoons he would take friends out on one of his homemade sailboats. Throughout his life he continued to create collages.

== Death and legacy ==
Varda died in 1971, after suffering a heart attack upon arriving by plane in Mexico City, where he had gone to visit Alice Rahon.

In Sausalito, his former boat the Vallejo is parked off Gate 5 Road and that area named is a "Varda Landing". He was the subject of a book, The Art and Life of Jean Varda (2015). Jean Varda is included in the Burt Glinn photography book, The Beat Scene (2018).

Before his death, in 1967, he was the subject of a short documentary film by Agnès Varda entitled "Uncle Yanco." Agnès Varda, who had never met Varda before making the film, referred to him as Uncle in the film because of the difference in their ages, but in fact she was Varda's much younger first cousin. She was the daughter of Jean L. Varda, who was a brother of Varda's father, Michel. The film explores his lifestyle, his ideologies and his ties to the Hippie subculture.

== Personal life ==
Varda was married three times: to Dorothy Varda (née Stewart, of Varda's Bookshop, 189 High Holborn) during the 1920s; to Virginia Barclay Varda (née Goldstein) from 1940 until approximately 1947; and to Chryssa Vardea Mavromichali, together from 1955 until 1958 and divorced in 1965. He had a daughter, Vagadu Varda (1946–2014) and is survived by one granddaughter.

== Murals ==
- mosaic mural (1960), created with Alfonso Pardiñas of Byzantine Mosaics, for the Villa Roma Hotel in Fisherman's Wharf, San Francisco but it was later moved in 1988 to Marinship Park in Sausalito.
- mosaic mural (c.1972), created with Alfonso Pardiñas of Byzantine Mosaics, for the Union City station BART, Union City, California
