= R. H. Barlow =

American anthropologist (1918–1951)

Robert Hayward Barlow
- Born: May 18, 1918; Leavenworth, Kansas, U.S.
- Died: January 2, 1951 (aged 32); Azcapotzalco, Mexico City, Mexico
- Occupations: Author; anthropologist

Robert Hayward Barlow (May 18, 1918 – January 1 or 2, 1951) was an American author, avant-garde poet, anthropologist and historian of early Mexico, and expert in the Nahuatl language. He was a correspondent and friend of horror writer H. P. Lovecraft, who appointed Barlow as the executor of his literary estate.

== Early life ==
Born while his father, Lieutenant Colonel Everett Darius Barlow, was serving with the American Forces in France, Barlow spent much of his youth at Fort Benning, Georgia, where his father was stationed. But he also moved from army post to army post in his earliest years. As a result, he never received much formal schooling, but he was a brilliant youth and pursued his education on his own. Around 1932 Col. Barlow received a medical discharge, retired on disability from the army, and settled his wife (Bernice Barlow) and son in the small town of DeLand, in central Florida, where he built a lakeside homestead.

Family difficulties later forced Robert H. Barlow to move to Washington, D.C., where, in 1934, as the son of a retired army officer, he received treatment for over-strained eyes at an army facility before returning to DeLand in 1935. In 1936, he received training at the Kansas City Art Institute, where Thomas Hart Benton was one of his teachers, and subsequently at San Francisco Junior College. Barlow settled for a time with the Beck family in Lakeport, California, where he helped publish H. P. Lovecraft's Commonplace Book and several other items from Beck's Futile Press. From Lakeport was mailed the second and final issue of his legendary amateur magazine Leaves, which he and Lovecraft had planned together before the latter's death.

== Life and career ==
=== Lovecraft associate ===
Barlow had been a friend of writers H. P. Lovecraft and Robert E. Howard since he was 13. He collaborated with Lovecraft on at least six stories ("The Slaying of the Monster" (1933); "The Hoard of the Wizard-Beast" (1933); the spoof "The Battle That Ended the Century" (1934); "Till A' the Seas" (1935); an unfinished parody, "Collapsing Cosmoses" (1935); and "The Night Ocean" (1936)), and Lovecraft made several extended visits to the young Barlow at his home in DeLand, Florida.

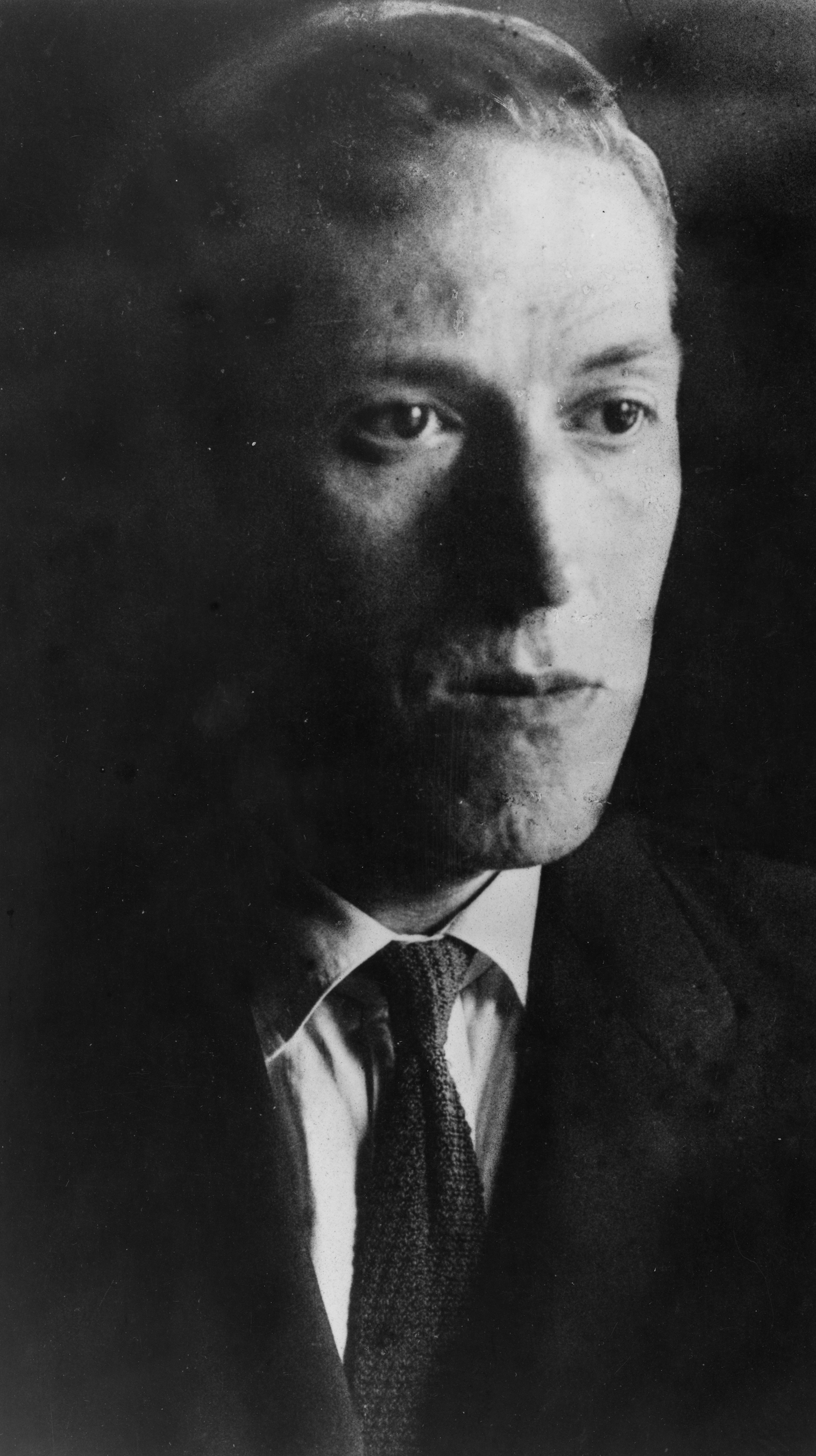
H. P. Lovecraft, photographed by Barlow in June 1934

Barlow attempted to bind and distribute Lovecraft's story "The Shunned House" (1924) but bound only a few copies (Arkham House distributed some bound versions of the original Barlow project as late as the 1970s).

Barlow aided significantly in the preservation of Lovecraft's manuscripts by typing texts in exchange for autographed manuscripts.

Barlow came to Providence immediately upon receiving a telegram from Lovecraft's aunt Annie Gamwell about Lovecraft's death. Lovecraft's "Instructions in Case of Decease", a separate document from his will, appointed Barlow his literary executor. Lovecraft biographer S. T. Joshi says that this document was never probated but that Ms. Gamwell created a formal contract confirming that Barlow was to have all of Lovecraft's manuscripts and notebooks, to publish as he saw fit, earnings from said publication to go to Ms. Gamwell with a 3% commission for himself. Barlow donated most of the manuscripts and some printed matter to the John Hay Library of Brown University.

Barlow transcribed Lovecraft's story "The Shadow Out of Time" and had the manuscript still in his possession when he secured a teaching position at Mexico City College. When he later became Chairman of the Department of Anthropology, he met June Ripley, a postgraduate student studying the Nahuatl language, Barlow's specialty. The two apparently became friends and Barlow entrusted the manuscript to Ripley before his suicide. She remained in Mexico for seven more years, then taught at several places in the United States before retiring in 1993. She died on December 28, 1994, and the long-lost Lovecraft manuscript was found by Ripley's sister-in-law Lucille Shreve. The manuscript, written in pencil in a child's notebook, was donated by Nelson and Lucille Shreve to the Lovecraft collection of John Hay Library.

=== Author, publisher ===
Barlow was interested in printing and after becoming involved in the early 'fan' scene relating to fantasy and science fiction, published several important journals - The Dragon-Fly (two issues - October 15, 1935, and May 15, 1936); and Leaves (two issues - Summer 1937; Winter 1938/39). . He was also proprietor of his imprint, the Dragon-Fly Press (Cassia, Florida) and under that imprint published two important works by members of the Lovecraft Circle - The Goblin Tower (the first verse collection by Frank Belknap Long – Lovecraft helped Barlow set the type for this) and "The Cats of Ulthar", a story by H. P. Lovecraft.

Barlow's fiction career was interrupted in 1937 by a variety of circumstances, including the death of his friend and mentor Lovecraft, and his own uprooting from Florida because of family troubles. In 1938 he edited Lovecraft's Notes and Commonplace Book and in 1939 edited After Sunset (John Howell, 1939), a collection of the best poems written by George Sterling in the last years before Sterling's suicide in 1926.

In 1943, Barlow lent assistance to the first bibliography of Lovecraft (by Francis T. Laney and William H. Evans). His poignant memoir of Lovecraft, "The Wind That is in the Grass" can be found in Marginalia (Arkham House, 1944). Barlow also contributed the introduction for the 1944 Arkham House volume Jumbee and Other Uncanny Tales by his fellow Floridian and Weird Tales author Henry S. Whitehead.

=== Sculptor ===
Barlow was highly regarded as a sculptor, before his move into anthropology, and in one letter (to Clark Ashton Smith, May 16, 1937) he complained that people took this work more seriously than his writings. But it appears that none of his sculptural work has survived.

=== Anthropologist ===
Following a suggestion from an interested counselor and friend, Barbara Mayer, that Barlow make the study of Mexico's antiquities his goal, he went to Mexico in 1940–41, studied at the Escuela Nacional de Ciencias Biologicas. Upon his return to California, he received a B.A. degree at the University of California in 1942.

Barlow moved permanently to Mexico around 1943, where he taught at several colleges, including the Universidad Nacional Autonoma de Mexico, becoming a distinguished anthropologist of Indigenous Mesoamerican culture. In 1944 he received a Rockefeller Foundation and in 1946–48 a Guggenheim Fellowship. In 1948 he became head of the Department of Anthropology at Mexico City College, which position he held at the time of his suicide on January 2, 1951. There he taught classes, largely to American students who were mostly there under funding from the post-war G.I. Bill. The famous writer William S. Burroughs, who lived in Mexico from 1950 to 1952, studied the Mayan Codices under Barlow in the first half of 1950. Burroughs went on at least one field trip with him to the Temple of Quetzalcoatl in Teotihuacan. The Mayan symbolism and political structure he found there later featured heavily in Burroughs' fiction.

At the same time Barlow cooperated with Prof. Salvador Mateos Higuera in a descriptive study of Mexican codices. Within a brief three years he had cooperated with George T. Smisor to plan and edit Tlalocan, a journal of source materials on native cultures of Mexico. Beginning in 1943 with the appearance of Tlalocan his productivity attained added momentum and his articles appeared with increasing frequency in the scholarly journals of Mexico, United States and Europe. Concern for minutiae led to such works of detail as "The 18th Century Relaciones Geograficas".

Barlow travelled to the Yucatán to study the Mayans, and to western Guerrero, where he studied the Tepuztecs. He founded two scholarly journals, and published around a hundred and fifty articles, pamphlets, and books.

In 1950 he published Mexihkatl itonalama ("The Mexican's calendar"), a Nahuatl-language newspaper. His work in Mesoamerican anthropology is of pioneering significance, and his collected anthropological papers are in the process of publication in Mexico. At this time Barlow was also continuing his work as a poet, writing both formalist verse and experimental verse of the Activist school pioneered by Lawrence Hart.

According to fellow anthropologist Charles E. Dibble, "In the brief span of a decade, Barlow gave Middle American research an impetus and perspective of enduring consequence. His contributions in Mexican archaeology, classical and modern Nahuatl, Mexican colonial history, and what he preferred to call "Bilderhandschriften" are of lasting importance." Dibble compared Barlow's zeal for searching for and deciphering little known or dimly recalled codices and colonial manuscripts to that of Zelia Nuttall. Barlow has been referred to as "the T. E. Lawrence of Mexico."

=== Suicide ===
Barlow had written as early as 1944 that he had "a subtle feeling that my curious and uneasy life is not destined to prolong itself". He killed himself at his home in Azcapotzalco, D.F, Mexico, on the first or second of January, 1951, apparently fearing the exposure of his homosexuality by a disgruntled student. On that afternoon, he locked himself in his room and took 26 capsules of Seconal, leaving pinned upon his door in Mayan pictographs "Do not disturb me. I want to sleep a long time."

William S. Burroughs, then studying Spanish, the Mexican codices and the Mayan language under Barlow, briefly described his death in a letter to Allen Ginsberg, dated January 11: "A queer Professor from K.C., Mo., head of the Anthropology dept. here at M.C.C. [Mexico City College] where I collect my $75 per month, knocked himself off a few days ago with overdose of goof balls. Vomit all over the bed. I can’t see this suicide kick."

== Bibliography ==
=== Books by Barlow ===
- Poems for a Competition. Sacramento, CA: The Fugitive Press, 1942. (verse). For these poems Barlow received the 26th award of the Emily Chamberlain Cook Prize in Poetry. The entire contents of the volume are reprinted in Eyes of the God (2002).
- View from a Hill. Azcapotzalco [no publisher given], 1947 (verse). The entire contents of the volume are reprinted in Eyes of the God (2002).
- The Extent of the Empire of the Culhua Mexico [Ibero-Americana 28]. Berkeley: University of California Press, 1949.

==== Posthumous publications ====
- The Mexican National Institute of Anthropology and History (Instituto Nacional de Antropología e Historia compiled his anthropological and archaeological studies carried out in Mexico in 7 volumes: I) Tlatelolco, rival of Tenochtitlan (1987); ll) Tlatelolco. Sources and history (1989); III) The Mexicas and the Triple Alliance (1990); IV) The extension of the empire of the Culhua Mexica (1992); V) Sources and studies on indigenous Mexico. First part: generalities and the Center of Mexico (1994); VI) Sources and studies on indigenous Mexico. Second part: current states of: Colima, Guerrero, Hidalgo, Michoacán, Morelos, Oaxaca, Puebla, Tlaxcala, Veracruz and Yucatán (1995) and VII) Miscellaneous writings (1999).
- Collapsing Cosmoses (with H. P. Lovecraft. West Warwick RI: Necronomicon Press, 1977. F&SF Fragments series; 500 copies only. This piece is reprinted in The Battle That Ended the Century and Collapsing Cosmoses (1992) and also collected in Eyes of the God (2002).
- Annals of the Jinns. Original series of stories in The Fantasy Fan (1933–35) and The Phantagraph; collected, West Warwick, RI: Necronomicon Press, 1978. Foreword "Robert H. Barlow and H. P. Lovecraft: A Reflection" by Kenneth W. Faig, Jr. Contains 10 of the tales. (The 11th Annal, "An Episode in the Jungle", was unpublished until collected in Eyes of the God (2002)). Note: A rewritten version of "Annal" V, "The Tomb of the God", appears in Lin Carter, ed, Kingdoms of Sorcery; Carter rewrote it from a half-legible copy, all he could find at the time.
- A Dim-Remembered Story West Warwick, RI: Necronomicon Press, 1980. Preface by H. P. Lovecraft. The tale is included in Eyes of the God (2002)
- The Night Ocean (with H. P. Lovecraft). West Warwick, RI: Necronomicon Press, 1978, 1982; 3rd pr 1989. The tale is included in Eyes of the God (2002).
- Crypt of Cthulhu No. 60 (1988) is a special issue devoted to Robert H. Barlow. It contains nine stories by Barlow (all save "A Fragment" collected later in Eyes of the God (2002)), together with two essays: "R. H. Barlow and the Recognition of Lovecraft" by S. T. Joshi, and "Robert H. Barlow as H. P. Lovecraft's Literary executor: An Appreciation" by Kenneth W. Faig. Faig's essay is reprinted in his The Unknown Lovecraft. NY: Hippocampus Press, 2009.
- The Battle That Ended the Century & Collapsing Cosmoses (with H. P. Lovecraft) West Warwick, RI: Necronomicon Press, 1992. This edition includes a corrected glossary of names. Both pieces are collected in The Eyes of the God (2002), where Battle is now footnoted with full annotations identifying the persons parodied.
- On Lovecraft and Life. West Warwick, RI: Necronomicon Press, 1992. Intro by S. T. Joshi. Contains two texts - firstly, a restored text of Barlow's journal of Lovecraft's 1934 visit as "Memories of Lovecraft" (originally published as "The Barlow Journal in August Derleth's Some Notes on H. P. Lovecraft (1959) and subsequently in the Derleth-edited Lovecraft compilation The Dark Brotherhood & Other Pieces (1966); both Derleth printings were heavily abridged). Secondly, Barlow's fragmentary "Autobiography" (approx 1938- Summer 1940).
- The Hoard of the Wizard-Beast and One Other (with H. P. Lovecraft). West Warwick, RI: Necronomicon Press, 1994. Intro by S. T. Joshi. The "other" is the story "The Slaying of the Monster". Includes the facsimile manuscripts of both stories, showing Lovecraft's hand in each. Both tales are included (text only, not facsimile mss) in The Eyes of the God (2002).
- Eyes of the God: The Weird Fiction and Poetry of Robert H. Barlow. Edited by S. T. Joshi, Douglas A. Anderson and David E. Schultz. NY: Hippocampus Press, 2002; revised and expanded, 2023. A comprehensive collection that excludes only Barlow's non-fiction (such as published letters, essays, etc). It includes two previously unpublished tales, "The Bright Valley" and "The Fidelity of Ghu", and also the previously unpublished 11th tale of Annals of the Jinns ("An Episode in the Jungle").

=== Books edited by Barlow ===
- H. P. Lovecraft. The Notes & Commonplace Book Employed by the Late H. P. Lovecraft Including His Suggestions for Story-Writing, Analyses of the Weird Story, and a List of Certain Basic Underlying Horros, &c, &c, Designed to Stimulate the Imagination. Lakeport, CA: The Futile Press, 1938; rpt West Warwick, RI: Necronomicon Press, 1978.
- George Sterling, After Sunset (verse). San Francisco: John Howell, Publisher, 1939.

=== Journals edited by Barlow ===
- Mesoamerican Notes (1949)
- Tlalocan
