= Rosalie Moore =

American poet (1910–2001)

- Born: October 8, 1910; Oakland, California, US
- Died: June 18, 2001 (aged 90); Petaluma, California, US
- Education: University of California, Berkeley
- Writing career
- Genre: poetry
- Notable works: The Grasshopper's Man and Other Poems

Rosalie Moore (October 8, 1910 in Oakland, California – June 18, 2001 in Petaluma, California) was an American poet.

== Education ==
She graduated from the University of California, Berkeley magna cum laude with a B.A. in 1932; with an MA in 1934.

== Career ==
From 1935 to 1937 she worked for radio station KLX, and then the Census Bureau. In 1937, she attended the poetry-writing classes of Lawrence Hart.

She joined the group of poets known as the Activists.

From 1965 to 1976, she taught at the College of Marin. Kay Ryan was her student. Her work has been published in Accent, Furioso, The New Yorker, and Saturday Review. Her papers are held at University of Oregon library.

== Personal life ==
She married William L. Brown in 1942; they had three daughters.

== Awards ==
- 1938 University of Chicago's Charles H. Sergel award for poetic drama with her play The Boar
- 1943 Albert Bender Award in literature
- 1949 Yale Series Younger Poet Award for The Grasshopper's Man (originally titled "Journeys Toward Center")
- 1950, 1951 Guggenheim Fellowships

== Works ==
- The Grasshopper's Man and Other Poems, Yale University Press, 1949
- Year of the Children, 1977 a book of poems dealing with the Children's Crusade in Europe in 1212 A.D.
- Of Singles and Doubles. Woolmer/Brotherson. 1979. ISBN 978-0-913506-07-3.
- Gutenberg in Strasbourg. Floating Island Publications. 1995. ISBN 978-0-912449-52-4.

=== Anthologies ===
- Dana Gioia; Chryss Yost; Jack Hicks, eds. (2004). "Still Without Life; Shipwreck; Ripeness is Rapid". California poetry: from the Gold Rush to the present. Heyday Books. ISBN 978-1-890771-72-0.
- Robert Hass, ed. (2000). American Poetry: E.E. Cummings to May Swenson. Library of America. ISBN 978-1-883011-78-9.
- Robert Hass; Jessica Fisher, eds. (2004). "Height". The Addison Street anthology: Berkeley's poetry walk. Heyday Books. ISBN 978-1-890771-94-2.
- David Kitchen, ed. (1988). "Catalogue". Earshot. Heinemann. ISBN 978-0-435-14032-8.
- Reginald Bretnor, ed. (1953). "Science Fiction and the Main Stream [sic]". Modern Science Fiction: Its Meaning and its Future. 52-11714: Coward-McCann.

=== Children's books ===
- The Forest Fireman, Coward-McCann, 1954
- Whistle Punk
- The Boy Who Got Mailed, Coward-McCann, 1957
- Big Rig, Coward-McCann, 1959
- The Department Store Ghost
- Tickley and the Fox, Lantern Press, 1962
- The Hippopotamus That Wanted to Be a Baby Lantern Press.

=== Play ===
- The Calydonian Boar Hunt.
