= Take This Hammer (film) =

- Directed by: Richard O. Moore
- Produced by: Richard O. Moore
- Distributed by: National Educational Television
- Release date: February 4, 1964
- Country: United States
- Language: English

Take This Hammer is a 1964 American documentary film produced and directed by KQED (TV)'s Richard O. Moore for National Educational Television in 1963. The film first aired on February 4, 1964, in the Bay Area, at 7:30 pm on Ch.9 KQED.

It features KQED's mobile film unit following author and activist James Baldwin in the spring of 1963, as he is driven around San Francisco to meet with members of the local African American community. He is escorted by Youth For Service's executive director Orville Luster and trying to establish: "The real situation of Negroes in the city, as opposed to the image San Francisco would like to present." He declares: "There is no moral distance ... between the facts of life in San Francisco and the facts of life in Birmingham. Someone's got to tell it like it is. And that's where it's at." Baldwin has frank exchanges with local people on the street and meets with community leaders in the Bayview and Western Addition neighborhoods. He also reflects on the racial inequality that African Americans are forced to confront and at one point tries to lift the morale of a young man, by expressing his conviction that: "There will be a Negro president of this country but it will not be the country that we are sitting in now."

A 16 mm print of Take This Hammer was digitally restored in 2009 by the San Francisco Bay Area Television Archive and screened at the San Francisco Museum of Modern Art in August with an introduction by Moore, who discussed the film with his cinematographer, Academy Award-winning documentary maker Irving Saraf.

In January 2011, Moore pointed out that nearly fifteen minutes of somewhat controversial statements from kids at Hunters Point were cut from his film. This was a concession that he deeply regretted. It was made following complaints from the KQED Board. They felt that the lengthy sequences with young Black Muslims were excessive and that the film should not be broadcast. Cutting the sequences shifted the attention to Baldwin and away from the Black Muslims. In the interests of getting the film broadcast, Moore agreed to the cuts. This cleared the way for both local and national broadcast. It also placed a great strain on his relationship with James Baldwin. He was genuinely surprised at the intensity of the anger expressed by the youth and felt that this should be the major emphasis of the film. The long monologue at the end of the film shifted the attention back to Baldwin. This may have made it more of an "artful" documentary but at the expense of, once again, ignoring the plight of young, urban African Americans. A 16mm film print featuring Moore's original edit (59 minutes long) was identified in the KQED Film Collection at the San Francisco Bay Area Television Archive in June 2013 which contained 15 minutes of extra footage, mostly featuring scenes of African American youth speaking with Baldwin about their lives and the police, on the streets of San Francisco. Movette Film Transfer of San Francisco remastered this 16mm positive film print in August 2013 in 2K resolution (2048x1556 pixels), using a Kinetta film scanner.

Moore also noted that there are no full credits at the end of the film. The person who made the connection with Baldwin possible was Mary Ann Pollar. Those involved with the KQED Film Unit were Irving Saraf, Phil Greene, and sound engineer Hank McGill. It was McGill's Corvair station wagon that was rigged up for filming in motion. They didn't have a wireless camera and recorder, but did have Irving squeezed into the trunk (the Corvair engine was in the rear) and Phil was on his stomach in the rear sharing space with a Magnasync.

On February 5, 2014, there was a free public screening of Take this Hammer (the director's cut) at the Bayview Opera House on Third Street in San Francisco, to commemorate the 50th anniversary of the film's first television broadcast. This community event was organized and co-sponsored by the Center for Political Education (CPE), the San Francisco Bay Area Television Archive, the Bayview Branch of the San Francisco Public Library and POWER (People Organized to Win Employment Rights). The San Francisco Arts Commission also assisted with producing this event.

In March and April 2014 sound editor John Nutt digitally restored the film's optical soundtrack, to improve the audio quality for long term preservation. This was made publicly available online in April.

== See also ==
- List of American films of 1963
