= Chryssa =

Greek-American artist (1933–2013)

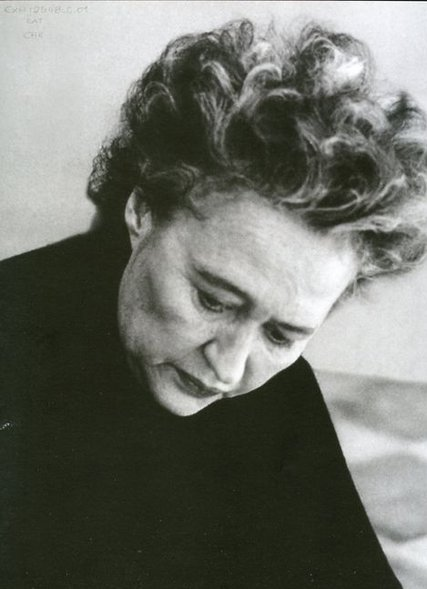
- Born: Chryssa Vardea-Mavromichali; December 31, 1933; Athens, Greece
- Died: December 23, 2013 (aged 79); Athens, Greece
- Known for: Luminist sculpture
- Spouse: Jean Varda (m. 1955–1958)

Chryssa Vardea-Mavromichali (Greek: Χρυσά Βαρδέα-Μαυρομιχάλη; December 31, 1933 – December 23, 2013) was a Greek American artist who worked in a wide variety of media. An American art pioneer in light art and luminist sculpture, known for her neon, steel, aluminum and acrylic glass installations, she always used the mononym Chryssa professionally. She worked from the mid-1950s in New York City studios and worked since 1992 in the studio she established in Neos Kosmos, Athens, Greece.

== Biography ==
Chryssa was born in Athens into the famous Mavromichalis family from the Mani Peninsula. Her family, while not rich, was educated and cultured; one of her sisters, who studied medicine, was a friend of the poet and novelist Nikos Kazantzakis. Shortly before her birth, Chryssa's father died, she was raised by her mother and two older sisters.

Chryssa grew up in Nazi-occupied Greece, which she later cites as formative to her art practice. The Greek resistance would write messages on the walls at night, which served as both a critical means for communication to citizens and an early lesson on the power of letters and symbols. As a child, she was imprisoned on three separate occasions during the German and Italian occupation.

Chryssa began painting during her teenage years and also studied to be a social worker. In 1953, on the advice of a Greek art critic, her family sent her to Paris to study at the Académie de la Grande Chaumière where André Breton, Edgard Varèse, and Max Ernst were among her associates and Alberto Giacometti was a visiting professor.

In 1954, at age twenty-one, Chryssa sailed for the United States, arrived in New York, and went to San Francisco to study at the California School of Fine Arts. Returning to New York in 1955, she became a United States citizen and established a studio in the city. April 1955, Chryssa has her first experience at Times Square, which would become a major influence for her work. In the same year, she married fellow artist Jean Varda and moved to Sausalito. The couple separated in 1958 and divorced in 1965. Although never an official resident of the Coenties Slip, Chryssa was associated with a group of artists connected by this residence. During this time, Chryssa had a relationship with Agnes Martin.

Her image is included in the iconic 1972 poster Some Living American Women Artists by Mary Beth Edelson.

At the age of 79, Chryssa died of heart-related problems, in Athens, Greece, on December 23, 2013.

== Major works and milestones ==
=== 1957–1969 ===
Chryssa's first major work was The Cycladic Books, a series of plaster reliefs which the French art critic Pierre Restany described as having produced "the purified and stylized geometric relief which is characteristic of Cycladic sculpture." According to the American art historian and critic Barbara Rose, The Cycladic Books preceded American minimalism by seventeen years.

Arrow: Homage to Times Square is a large 8 ft × 8 ft (2.4 m × 2.4 m) work in painted cast aluminum. In a 2005 interview in Vouliagmeni, Chryssa said: "I only ever kept one work for more than 15 years in my studio, "The Arrow" – it is now in Albany, in the Rockefeller Collection."

Chryssa's first solo exhibition was mounted at The Guggenheim. Times Square Sky is a 5 ft × 5 ft × 9.5 ft (1.5 m × 1.5 m × 2.9 m) in work in neon, aluminum and steel.

Chryssa's work was shown at the Museum of Modern Art in curator Dorothy Canning Miller's Americans 1963 exhibition. The artists represented in the show also included Richard Anuszkiewicz, Lee Bontecou, Robert Indiana, Richard Lindner, Marisol, Claes Oldenburg, Ad Reinhardt, James Rosenquist and others.

The Gates to Times Square, regarded as "one of the most important American sculptures of all time" and "a thrilling homage to the living American culture of advertising and mass communications", is a 10 ft (3.0 m) cube installation of two huge letter As through which visitors may walk into "a gleaming block of stainless steel and Plexiglas that seems to quiver in the play of pale blue neon light" which is controlled by programmed timers. First shown in Manhattan's Pace Gallery, it was given to the Albright-Knox Art Gallery in Buffalo, New York in 1972.

Clytemnestra is in the Corcoran Gallery of Art collection in Washington, D.C. It is based on the anguish of Clytemnestra, upon learning that her daughter would be sacrificed by Agamemnon, as portrayed by Chryssa's friend Irene Papas in the Michael Cacoyannis production of Iphigeneia at Aulis on Broadway. This work, or another version of it, has also been installed outside the Megaron Concert Hall in Athens.

=== From 1972 ===
The Whitney Museum of American Art mounted a solo exhibition of works by Chryssa. That's All (early 1970s), is the central panel of a triptych related to The Gates of Times Square, was acquired by the Museum of Modern Art between 1975 and 1979. Chryssa's solo exhibition at the Gallerie Denise René was reviewed for Time magazine by art critic Robert Hughes before it went on to the Galleries Denise René in Düsseldorf and Paris. She also received the Guggenheim fellowship.

Chryssa's 70 ft (21 m) Untitled Light Sculpture, six large 'W's connected by cables and programmed electronically to create changing patterns of light through 900 feet of neon tubing, is suspended in the atrium of 33 West Monroe, a Skidmore, Owings & Merrill design and its former headquarters, in Chicago, Illinois. Mott Street, named for Mott Street in Chinatown, Manhattan, is a large work in dark aluminium and red-toned neon light which is installed in the Evangelismos station of the Athens Metro. Other works by Chryssa in composite honeycomb aluminum and neon in the 1980s and 1990s include Chinatown, Siren, Urban Traffic, and Flapping Birds.

In 1992, after closing her SoHo studio, which art dealer Leo Castelli had described as "one of the loveliest in the world," Chryssa returned to Greece. She found a derelict cinema which had become a storeroom stacked with abandoned school desks and chairs, behind the old Fix Brewery near the city center in Neos Kosmos, Athens. Using the desks to construct enormous benches, she converted the space into a studio for working on designs and aluminum composite honeycomb sculptures. The Athens National Museum of Contemporary Art, which was founded in 2000 and owns Chryssa's Cycladic Books, is in the process of converting the Fix Brewery into its permanent premises. 'Chryssa & New York' survey was co-organized by the Menil Collection and Dia Art Foundation.

== Monographs ==
A partial listing of monographs on Chryssa's work:

- 1997: Barbara Rose. Chryssa: Cycladic Books 1957–1962. Greece: Goulandris Museum of Cycladic Art ISBN 960-7064-20-8
- 1968: Diane Waldman. Chryssa: Selected Works 1955–1967. New York: Pace Gallery (48 pp.) ISBN 0-938608-21-5.
- 1974: Sam Hunter. Chryssa. New York: Harry N. Abrams, Inc. (76 pp.) ISBN 0-500-22018-2.
- 1977: Pierre Restany. Chryssa. New York: Harry N. Abrams, Inc. (274 pp.) ISBN 0-8109-0366-0.
- 1983: Douglas Schultz. Chryssa: Urban Icons. Buffalo: Albright-Knox (170 pp.) ISBN 0-914782-47-9.
- 1990: Douglas Schultz. Chryssa: Cityscapes. London: Thames & Hudson (162 pp.) ISBN 0-500-09209-5.

== Exhibitions and collections ==
Partial listings of exhibitions and institutions with works by Chryssa in permanent collections:

=== Solo exhibitions ===
- 1961: Solomon R. Guggenheim Museum
- 1965: Institute of Contemporary Art, Philadelphia
- 1968: Harvard University
- 1972: Whitney Museum of American Art
- 1979: Musée d'Art Moderne de la Ville de Paris
- 2024: The Menil Collection
- 2024: Wrightwood 659

=== Group exhibitions ===
- 1961: Le Nouveau Réalisme à Paris et à New York, Galerie Rive Droite, Paris, June 1961
- 1963: Museum of Modern Art
- 1964: Dial "Y" For Sculpture, YMWHA, Philadelphia PA October 21 – November 24, 1964
- 1977: Documenta '77 in Kassel
- 1991: Princeton University Art Museum
- 1997: Leo Castelli Gallery
- 2000, 2003 & 2005: European Cultural Center of Delphi
- 2007: Hirshhorn Museum and Sculpture Garden
- 2017: documenta 14

=== Collections ===
- Albright-Knox Art Gallery
- Boca Raton Museum of Art
- Corcoran Gallery of Art
- The Governor Nelson A. Rockefeller Empire State Plaza Art Collection
- Hirshhorn Museum and Sculpture Garden
- Macedonian Museum of Contemporary Art in Thessaloniki
- Museum of Modern Art
- National Museum of Contemporary Art in Athens
- National Gallery of Athens
- Walker Art Center
- Whitney Museum of American Art

Additional exhibitions and collections are listed by the Artforum Culture Foundation, AskART.com, and other sources.
