= Till A' the Seas =

- Short story by H. P. Lovecraft, R. H. Barlow
- Country: USA
- Language: English
- Genre: science fiction

Publication
- Published in: The Californian
- Publication date: 1935

"Till A' the Seas" is a post-apocalyptic short story by American horror fiction writer H. P. Lovecraft and R. H. Barlow. The title is a reference to the poem "A Red, Red Rose" by Robert Burns.

== Plot ==
The story consists of two parts. The first describes the events that took place on Earth from a few thousand years to a few million years after the present day. The climate on Earth is getting warmer and warmer, oceans are slowly disappearing. People are gradually moving towards the poles, becoming more and more barbaric. Mankind is steadily dying out because of the lack of water, until there are only a few decades left.

The second part starts in a small village in the desert. There is only one man left in the village: young Ull. A very old woman, the only company for the man, died a short time earlier. Ull starts a journey in search of other people using his knowledge of old legends. In a few days, extremely thirsty and tired, he finds a small settlement. Ull enters one of the houses and finds nothing but a dried-up old skeleton. Depressed, he starts searching for water and finds a well with a little water in it. Trying to reach the string to pull up a dip-bucket, he falls into the well and dies. And after the death of the last man, mankind has totally vanished.

== Creation and publication ==
The short story was a literary collaboration between H.P. Lovecraft and R. H. Barlow (who was only 17 years old at the time). It was written in January 1935 and published in Summer 1935 in The Californian. It was republished in 2012 in Medusa's Coil and Others.
