= Tom Kromer =

American novelist (1906–1969)

- Born: October 20, 1906; Huntington, West Virginia, U.S.
- Died: January 10, 1969 (aged 62); Huntington, West Virginia, U.S.
- Resting place: Spring Hill Cemetery; Huntington, West Virginia, U.S.
- Education: Marshall University
- Spouse: Janet Smith Kromer (m. 1936; died 1960)
- Writing career
- Movements: Modernism, Realism

Thomas Michael Kromer (October 20, 1906 – January 10, 1969) was an American writer, mostly known for his Waiting for Nothing (1935), a semi-autobiographical novel of vagrant or hobo life during the Great Depression.

== Biography ==
Kromer was born and raised in Huntington, West Virginia, the oldest of five brothers, and he had at least two sisters. His mother was Grace Thornburg, and his father was Michael Albert Kromer, an immigrant from Russia who worked as a coal miner and glass blower. He attended Marshall University for periods in 1925-1929 and did not graduate.

He wrote his novel after five years of living as a hobo, riding trains and traveling across the United States. He spent 15 months in CCC camp in California, but was mostly living as a vagabond. Kromer spent time at Camp Skull Creek, Camp Murpheys, Fort MacArther, and Camp Halls Flat. He also published short stories in Pacific Weekly, founded and edited by Lincoln Steffens, and an unfinished novel about coal mining and glass blowing, Michael Kohler, a section of which he adapted as a short story for the American Spectator. Kromer's literary agent was Maxim Lieber, recommended to him by Lincoln Steffens who was the first literary figure to read and praise the manuscript for Waiting for Nothing.

He married Jeannette (Janet) Smith in 1936 while he was being treated for tuberculosis and she for rheumatic heart disease in Albuquerque. They restored an adobe house in Albuquerque, (now on the National Register of Historic Places.) He stopped writing in the 1940s, became a recluse, and lived as an invalid in Albuquerque. After his wife died in 1960, his family returned him to Huntington, West Virginia, where his sisters and mother cared for him. He died there in 1969 and was buried at Spring Hill Cemetery in Huntington in a family plot.

== Waiting for Nothing ==
Dedicated "to Jolene, who turned off the gas," the work is a realistic account of life as a homeless man during the Great Depression. There is no overarching theme to the novel, which is a collection of anecdotes. Except for a few stories, Kromer said the incidents in the novel were autobiographical.

Straightforward, declarative sentences in the tough-guy argot of the time ("I admire that stiff. He has got the guts. He does not like parting with his dough") are characteristic of Kromer, as are spare descriptions of grim scenes ("When I look at these stiffs by the fire, I am looking at a graveyard. There is hardly room to move between the tombstones. . . . The epitaphs are chiseled in sunken shadows on their cheeks"). The settings include rescue missions, flop houses, abandoned buildings and the sidewalk outside a nice restaurant. In one chapter, the narrator slowly comes to realize that the pitch-black boxcar he is riding in contains another rider, who is quietly, slowly, stalking him.

Waiting for Nothing was first published by Alfred A. Knopf in 1935, reissued by Hill & Wang in 1968, and, in a definitive edition with most of his other writings, edited by Arthur D. Casciato and James L.W. West III, reprinted as Waiting for Nothing and Other Writings by the University of Georgia Press in 1986. In edition, Waiting for Nothing was published in England in 1935 by Constable & Co. with a chapter being omitted for "contents of the chapter were too strong for any publisher to risk in these days of active censorship."

=== Reception ===
Reviews praised the book when it was first published. It was reviewed by the New York Times in 1935 and 1968. It has been the subject of poetry and has been studied in scholarly journals in 1988, 1990, 1995, 1998 and 2019, among others. Echoes of Kromer's work can be found in succeeding authors, Breece D'J Pancake in particular. This connection seems appropriate considering Pancake grew up in Milton, West Virginia, less than 30 miles from Kromer's hometown of Huntington. Hemingway-like storytelling, the pair share similarities in their approach to literature. Trilobites, Hollow, and The Honored Dead, members of The Collected Breece D'J Pancake: Stories, Fragments, Letters do not necessarily have a clear intention or theme, but rather explore the mind of a central character, giving a sort of psychological breakdown. Structurally, streaks of Kromer's Waiting for Nothing are evident in the short stories of Pancake. Another author who draws inspiration from his predecessors is Pinckney Benedict, the trio creating an author genealogy in a sense. An accomplished Appalachian writer, Benedict displays his Kromer/Pancake roots in his story-telling. It is evident Kromer's work was received with high regard by his successors, influencing their writing. While having a less direct correlation, the intricacies of "stiffs" and the impoverished in Waiting for Nothing appear with a similar depiction in John Steinbeck's The Grapes of Wrath, both comparing those in poverty to "ghosts in a graveyard."

== Michael Kohler ==
In the words of Kromer himself, his unfinished novel Michael Kohler is 'a working class novel dealing with working-class people.' Taking place in the era of the Haymarket affair, Michael Kohler touches on the idea of workers having influence on the value of their labor, essentially being non-existent. The unfinished novel depicts the structural economic flaws of the Mine Wars, which occurred in West Virginia from 1912 to 1921. After a few introductory chapters, the reader is introduced to Michael Kohler, son of Michael Kohler senior, and effectively becomes the protagonist. Through the lens of Michael, one can see the critiques Kromer is highlighting, being the disparity in wealth and greed of higher-ups. During a period where movements such as the Mine Wars gained traction, it becomes clear what message Kromer is portraying, albeit an unfinished project. Michael Kohler can be read and interpreted as a socialist novel through themes of labor and working class struggles.
