= Bay Area Television Archive =

- Type: archive
- Location: San Francisco, USA
- Coordinates: 37.7213°N 122.4783°W

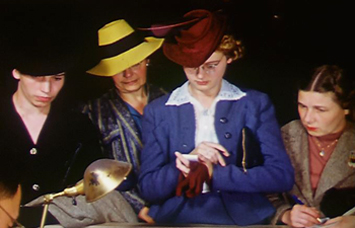
Still image from the 16mm Kodachrome film 'Art in Action', produced by Orville C. Goldner c1939.

Edited aerial views of San Francisco, taken from a 1973 Philip Greene film.

The Bay Area Television Archive (BATA) is a regional moving image archive. It preserves and digitally restores 16mm newsfilm, documentaries and other shows produced by TV stations in Northern California (1948–2005), local Emmy Award-winning programs (1974–2005) and privately donated film collections (1939–2004).

BATA was established in 1982 by Helene Whitson and is part of the J. Paul Leonard Library's Special Collections Unit, located on San Francisco State University's main campus.

== Collections ==
=== TV stations ===
BATA preserves over 3000 hours of 16mm newsfilm, documentaries and other shows produced by local TV stations KPIX-TV, KQED (TV), KRON-TV and KTVU. This includes footage of the first TV broadcast in Northern California by KPIX-TV on December 22, 1948, from the roof of the Mark Hopkins Hotel on Nob Hill, in San Francisco.

=== Local Emmy Award winners ===
The Northern California chapter of the National Academy of Television Arts & Sciences has donated over 300 hours of local Emmy Award-winning news footage and documentaries to BATA.

=== Private donors ===
The TV Archive curates approximately 100 hours of archival footage donated by local film makers and politicians from Northern California. These include the Willie Brown (politician) Collection, which features news reports and programs relating to the former State Assembly Speaker and Mayor of San Francisco's career and the Dorothy Goldner Collection, which features silent, color film of the Golden Gate International Exposition, produced by Orville C. Goldner in 1939–40.

== Access ==
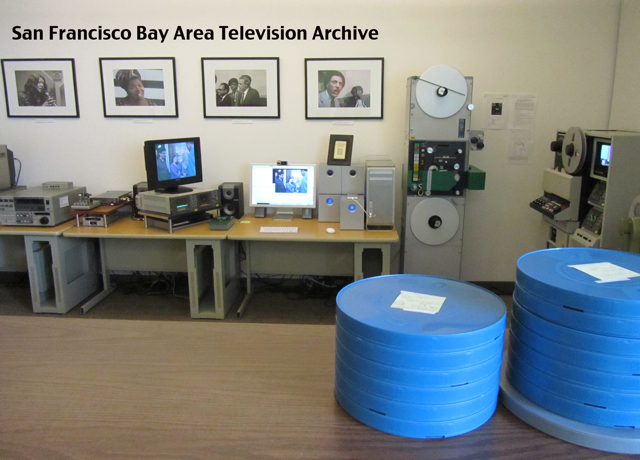
Image transfer suite at the Bay Area Television Archive.

=== Online viewing ===
Selected archival footage from BATA's collections is publicly available to view online for free at the website of SF State's Digital Information Virtual Archive (DIVA).

=== Public screenings ===
Former KQED producer and director Richard O. Moore introduced screenings of his documentaries Take This Hammer (1963) and Losing just the same (1966), at the San Francisco Museum of Modern Art, in August 2009. Newsfilm clips featuring the Occupation of Alcatraz Island by Native American activists (1969–71), were projected onto San Francisco's Coit Tower in November 2009, as part of the official 40th Anniversary remembrance program for the occupation.

=== Film production ===
Archival footage from BATA features in Gus Van Sant's 2008 Oscar-winning biographical film of the gay rights activist and politician Harvey Milk Milk (2008 American film), in Rob Epstein and Jeffrey Friedman's 2010 Howl (2010 film) biopic of beat poet Allen Ginsberg and also in David Weissman and Bill Weber's 2011 documentary film about the AIDS crisis in San Francisco We Were Here (film).
