= Mary Fabilli =

American poet and illustrator

- Born: Mary Louise Fabilli; February 16, 1914; Gardiner, New Mexico
- Died: September 2, 2011 (aged 97); Oakland, California
- Education: University of California, Berkeley, A.B., 1941
- Occupations: Poet, illustrator, art teacher, museum curator
- Spouse(s): William Everson, 1948 (annulled)
- Parent(s): Vicenzo and Giacinta (Pone) Fabilli

Mary Fabilli (February 16, 1914 − September 2, 2011) was an American poet and illustrator who for many years made her living as an art teacher and curator at the Oakland Museum in Oakland, California. She was for a time married to poet William Everson and was close friends with poet Robert Duncan, both associated with the Berkeley Renaissance and the San Francisco Renaissance in nearby San Francisco. Fabilli's published work centered on her personal experiences, particularly those related to her Italian heritage and her Roman Catholic faith, and she did not consider herself to be a Beat poet.

== Personal history ==
Fabilli was the daughter of farmers, Vicenzo and Giacinta (Pone) Fabilli, who had immigrated from Pacentro, Italy, to the coal-mining company town of Gardiner, New Mexico (now a ghost town, whose area is part of Vermejo Park Ranch in Colfax County), before Fabilli's birth in 1914. The family moved several more times before buying a 12-acre (4.9 ha) farm near Delano, California, where Fabilli grew up, eventually enrolling at the University of California, Berkeley. To help pay for college, she worked for the National Youth Administration (NYA) in Berkeley and then on art project for the Works Progress Administration (WPA) in Oakland. She graduated with a bachelor's degree in art and a minor in English in 1941. During World War II, Fabilli worked swing shift as a laborer in the Kaiser Shipyards in Richmond, California. When the war ended, Fabilli taught art to seventh-graders in Berkeley and to adults at the Young Women's Christian Association (YWCA) in Oakland, and did clerical work for the East Bay Labor Journal before starting a career of almost 30 years teaching art and California history at the Oakland Museum. She became associate curator of the museum's history department before retiring in 1977. She was also involved with Dorothy Day's Catholic Worker movement.

Fabilli married Everson on June 12, 1948, and, influenced by her religious devotion, he converted to Catholicism. In 1951 he joined the Dominican Order as a lay brother, and the marriage was annulled. Fabilli died in 2011 in Oakland.

== Work ==
In addition to her books of poetry, prose, and illustrations, Fabilli illustrated Duncan's “Heavenly City, Earthly City” (1947), and created woodblocks for Everson's A Privacy of Speech (1949) and Triptych for the Living: Poems (1951). Everson posed for two of the saints in her collection Saints: Nine Linoleum Blocks (1960). Her book-length compilation of text and illustrations by artist Ray Boynton was completed for the Oakland Museum in 1976. Fabilli contributed poetry to anthologies and collections, including New Directions 8 (1944); Perspectives on William Everson (1992); Dark God of Eros: A William Everson Reader (2003), and Light Dark Wind Moon (2004), and to periodicals, including Occident, Circle Magazine, Talisman, Epitaph, Berkeley Miscellany, Ritual, and Experimental Review.

The Bancroft Library at the University of California, Berkeley, has a collection, "Mary Fabilli papers, circa 1936–2009" that includes correspondence, diaries, notebooks, and other material.

== Bibliography ==
=== Poetry ===
- The Old Ones (written and illustrated by Fabilli) (1966)
- Aurora Bligh and Early Poems, 1935–1949 (poetry and prose) (1968)
- The Animal Kingdom: Poems, 1964–1974 (1975)
- Winter Poems (1983) OCLC 12956821
- Pilgrimage (1985) OCLC 12956839
- My Body (1985) OCLC 1044058296
- Simple Pleasures (1987) OCLC 21805132
- Shingles and Other Poems (1990) OCLC 27177691
- Pious Poems (2001) OCLC 56932376

=== Prose ===
- Aurora Bligh 2000 (2000) OCLC 56932369

=== Illustrations ===
- Saints: Nine Linoleum Blocks (1960) OCLC 7206164

=== Compilations ===
- Ray Boynton and the Mother Lode : The Depression Years : [exhibition], May 4 through August 15, 1976, the Oakland Museum, History Special Gallery (text and illustrations compiled by Mary Fabilli in 1976) OCLC 2523247
