= Albert Halper =

American novelist

- Born: August 3, 1904; Chicago
- Died: January 19, 1984 (aged 79); Pawling, New York
- Occupations: Novelist; playwright; writer
- Family: Lorna Halpert (wife), Thomas Halpert (son)

Albert Halper (1904–1984) was an American novelist and playwright.

== Life ==
Albert Halper was born on a kitchen table on the west side of Chicago on August 3, 1904, the son of Lithuanian immigrants from Vilna. His father, Isaac, owned a series of tiny grocery stores; his mother, Rebecca, stayed at home, raising their six children. After graduating Marshall High School, young Albert worked in a factory, warehouse, and post office, all the time committed to becoming a writer. The death of his mother in 1928 eliminated his sole reason for remaining in Chicago, and when offered a promotion at the post office, he quit the next day and soon left for New York.

In New York, he became a protégé of Elliot E. Cohen, the brilliant editor of the Menorah Journal, and began to publish in The American Mercury, The Dial, and other prominent literary magazines. His first novel, Union Square (1933), traces the lives of Depression era New Yorkers living in that neighborhood, and was a best seller and a Literary Guild selection. The Foundry (1934), a novel of factory life, also was widely praised. Considered one of the most promising writers to appear during the Depression, he was awarded a residency at the Yaddo writers colony and a Guggenheim fellowship. With the end of the Depression, Halper found the "Depression writer" label an obstacle, and though he continued to produce, he was unable to regain the prominence he had earlier experienced. Many of these later efforts, however, are of high quality, especially his collection of short stories, The Golden Watch (1953), and his memoir, Good-bye, Union Square (1970).

What distinguished Halper as a writer was his characteristic slangy, conversational style, his skill in bringing characters to life, and his uncanny ability to reproduce context and ambience. Above all a story teller, he predated postmodern intellectualizing, but the simplicity of his prose signaled not a casual, slap-dash approach to writing, but instead a deliberate strategy cunningly designed to immerse the reader in the story. As a result of his childhood poverty and his literary focus on workers, Halper was sometimes called a proletarian writer, a title he rejected both because it implied allegiance to the Communist Party and a lack of interest in non-proletarian segments of society. Instead, he said that his "subjects were people in a variety of situations." Communists were not hard to find in Depression New York, but Halper never joined the party and in his memoir revealed his horror at the cruelty he observed at a meeting of the John Reed Club. Later, in the 1940s, he was traumatized when he learned that his close friend and agent, Maxim Leiber, was a Soviet operative who had betrayed his trust and brought him to the attention of the FBI. A lifelong city person, Halper in his 60s moved to a small house in the country outside Pawling, New York, where he lived the rest of his life. He died on January 15, 1984, at age 79. He was survived by his wife Lorna Blaine Halper, a painter who died in 2012, and his son, Thomas.

== Works ==
=== Novels ===
- Union Square (1933, 1962)
- The Foundry (1934, 1962)
- On the Shore (1934)
- The Chute (1937, 1964)
- Sons of the Fathers (1940)
- The Little People (1942, 1976)
- Only an Inch from Glory (1943, 1963)
- The Golden Watch (1953)
- Atlantic Avenue (1956, 1966)
- The Fourth Horseman of Miami Beach (1966)

=== Memoirs ===
- Good-bye, Union Square: A Writer's Memoir of the Thirties (1970)

=== Plays ===
- Top Man
- My Aunt Daisy

=== Articles ===
- The Dial
- Midland
- Prairie Schooner
- Menorah Journal
- Pagany
- The American Mercury
- New Masses
- Harper's (articles)
- Atlantic Monthly (articles Archived March 3, 2016, at the Wayback Machine)
- New Yorker (articles)
- Yale Review (articles)
- Commentary (articles)

=== As Editor ===
- This Is Chicago: An Anthology (1952)
- The Chicago Crime Book (1967)
