= Harry Roskolenko =

American writer

- Born: New York City
- Writing career
- Genres: Poetry, fiction, Non-fiction

Harry Roskolenko (1907–1980) was an American author of poetry, novels, travelogues, screenplays, and journalism.

== Early life ==
Harry Roskolenko was born on September 20, 1907, on the Lower East Side of Manhattan in New York City. He was the thirteenth of fourteen children. His first eight siblings were born in Ukraine, where they died of various childhood diseases. The remaining six were born in New York City.

== Career ==
Roskolenko used many pseudonyms throughout his career, including Jean de Ballard, Rollin Coss, H.R. Crozier, Paul Goch, Elizabeth Goode, Michael Leigh, Ross K. Lynn, Russ Lynn, Paul Niloc, H.R. Rose, Harry Roskolenkier, Allen V. Ross, Collin Ross, and Harry Ross.

== Death ==
Harry Roskolenko died from cancer in July 1980 at Beth Israel Hospital. He was 72 years old and resided in the Manhattan artists' community Westbeth.

== Books ==
- Roskolenko, Harry (1970). American Civilization. National Press.
- Roskolenko, Harry (1947). Notes from a Journey: Poems.
- Roskolenko, Harry (1967). The Terrorized. Prentice-Hall.
- Roskolenko, Harry (1958). Poet on a Scooter. Dial Press.
- Roskolenko, Harry (1965). When I was Last on Cherry Street. Stein and Day.
- Roskolenko, Harry (1954). Black is a Man. Padell.
- Roskolenko, Harry (1938). Sequence on Violence. Signal.
- Roskolenko, Harry (1971). The Time that was Then The Lower East Side, 1900-1914, an Intimate Chronicle. Dial Press.
- Roskolenko, Harry (1952). Baedeker of a Bachelor: The Exotic Adventures and Bizarre Journeys of a Carefreeman. Padell Book Company.
- Roskolenko, Harry (1962). White Man Go!. Regency Books.
