= Carlyle Ferren MacIntyre =

American writer

"Mac" Macintyre, Paris, 1956

Carlyle Ferren MacIntyre (July 16, 1890 - June 30, 1967) is an American poet, known for his poetry and translations of Baudelaire, Verlaine, George, Goethe and Rilke. His work appeared in The Nation, and Harper's.

== Biography ==
He was born on July 16, 1890, in Des Moines, Iowa, USA.

He graduated from University of Southern California, and received his doctorate in Marburg, Germany. He taught at Los Angeles Polytechnic High School, Occidental College in Los Angeles, University of California, Los Angeles, and University of California, Berkeley. He spent 1938 in Europe on a Guggenheim Fellowship, working on a translation of Goethe's Faust. A book of poems, Cafés and Cathedrals ensued and was published in 1939. Faust Part 1 appeared in 1941, but publication negotiations for Part 2 collapsed, and the manuscript remains in a box at UCLA's Young Research Library.

The poem "Detail on a Street Corner in Herculaneum", from "Cafés", resulted in MacIntyre being transferred from UCLA to Berkeley. MacIntyre was awarded Fulbright Fellowships in 1948 and 1953 to continue work on his translations of the above-mentioned authors.

He lived in Paris, Mexico, Germany, and France from 1955 to 1967. He lived his later years in Paris, France. He suffered an incapacitating stroke in 1960.

He died on June 30, 1967, in Stuttgart, Germany.

== Legacy ==
His papers are held at UCLA.

== Selected works ==
- Faust, Part I, 1941
- Cafés and Cathedrals, 1939
- The Black Bull: Poems, 1942
- Tiger of Time,: And other poems by Robert Payne and C. F. MacIntyre 1965
- MacIntyre: poems 1975
- October Songs 1982
- French Symbolist Poetry, 50th Anniversary Edition, 2007
