= Walker Winslow =

American writer

- Born: Walker Winslow; February 2, 1905; Idaho, U.S.
- Died: May 3, 1969 (aged 64); Pacific Grove, California, U.S.
- Occupation: novelist
- Writing career
- Pen name: Harold Maine (used for an autobiographical work)
- Notable works: Man in Paradise, If A Man Be Mad, The Menninger Story

Walker Winslow (February 2, 1905 – May 3, 1969) was an American poet and novelist, one of whose books — an autobiographical work describing his experiences in psychiatric hospitals, both as a patient and as a ward attendant — was published under the pseudonym Harold Maine. Winslow was something of a larger than life character: "Walker's forte was people" wrote Henry Miller in his 1957 book Big Sur and the Oranges of Hieronymus Bosch. Miller also described is friend's writing talent:

The man who could write like a breeze was Walker Winslow. Walker had written several books, under various names, before coming to Big Sur. He had also written heaps of poems. But it was not until he began his autobiographical novel, If a Man Be Mad, that he found his true vein.

— Henry Miller, Big Sur and the Oranges of Hieronymus Bosch (1957)

== Life and work ==
=== Early years — Idaho, Honolulu ===
Walker Winslow was born in Idaho. His father, Burt Winslow, died when Walker was two and a half. His mother remarried when Walker was five, and the stern approval-withholding nature of his step-father played a dominating and detrimental role in Walker's psychology. Walker left home at the age of sixteen and joined the peacetime army, and was already drinking heavily by the age of 18.

In the mid-1930s Winslow was writing poetry, working on a novel, and living in Honolulu, where he had moved with his wife Kathryn, who was also writing and publishing poetry. In Hawaii Winslow worked in the publicity departments of the Honolulu Chamber of Commerce and also in the sugar industry. His writing also appeared in the left wing magazine The Anvil, and Kathryn kept up a correspondence with its editor, the novelist Jack Conroy, for the next dozen or so years. Walker's problems with alcohol continued and worsened, leading to him voluntarily admitting himself to a psychiatric hospital for one month. Walker and Kathryn ended their marriage, which it turned out had never been legal because Walker had not actually divorced from an earlier wife, having simply deserted her and having assumed that she would have had the marriage annulled. Walker and Kathryn remained on good terms and kept up a frequent, at times daily, correspondence. After their separation, Kathryn moved to San Francisco, and Walker soon followed her there, before heading down to South California to the area where his parents lived and to the county where his first wedding had taken place, to sort things out. Kathryn later heard that while he had been visiting his parents, Walker had met again a "sort of cousin," who had, through "some dim relationship" with his family, entered his life several times during his childhood; she had been also visiting from New York. After a period of intense correspondence the two reunited, when she travelled to Nevada for a divorce, and the two quickly got married.

=== Portland, Denver, New York ===
In 1938 Winslow was living in Portland, Oregon, and working on 'Mining Life in Oregon and the Pacific Northwest' for the Federal Writers' Project. By 1939 he had been transferred to Denver, Colorado with the help of his new wife Helen's former father-in-law, the artist Boardman Robinson. Helen Elizabeth Simons (b. 5 Sept 1908) had been married to John Whitney Robinson, and had been an actress and a dancer in New York; she knew figures from that city's literary scene, such as Sinclair Lewis and Thomas Wolfe, and herself had manuscript drafts in progress, having already published, in 1937, under the pseudonym Helen Anderson (Anderson being her mother's maiden name) the early lesbian novel Pity for women. In Denver, Walker and Helen became friends of Weldon Kees and his wife Ann, after they rented an apartment near the Kees. Weldon Kees had known not only of Helen's novel, but also had been in particular impressed by the fact that Walker had had eight poems appear in an illustrated full page of Esquire. Winslow was a heavy drinker, and his antics were often described in Ann Kees' letters to the Kees' friend Norris Getty. One drinking binge, which started on a Saturday, was fuelled by copious drinks at a dinner with the Kees on Sunday, and culminated a few days later at the house of the poet Thomas Hornsby Ferril, who at that time was a publicity man for Great Western Sugar; Winslow ended up punching the sugar company's president. Following this he was committed to the Colorado Psychopathic Hospital. He separated from Helen and lived a down-and-out alcoholic's existence in New York, ending up in Bellevue Hospital. Helen had moved back in with her former in-laws in Colorado Springs, and arranged a divorce.

Winslow moved from Bellevue to a Christian-run institution for alcoholics in a rural setting about fifty miles from New York, and while there he started working on an old manuscript for a novel. In 1941, after returning to the city, he was involved with Alcoholics Anonymous in its early days; the wider publicity that a Saturday Evening Post article gave the organisation led to growth and changes, which at first Winslow had been swept up in, but in the end led to him tapering off his involvement. That year Man in Paradise, subtitled 'A Novel of Hawaii as it is today,' was published by Smith & Durrell, New York One of the novel's themes was the growing influence of the island's resident Japanese population; the book came out in late November, not much more than a week before the attack on Pearl Harbor.

On a visit to his mother and step-father, Winslow suffered some form of psychotic breakdown which involved hallucinations. Upon release he found life in the outside world too daunting, and struck upon the idea of working as an attendant in a psychiatric facility, where not only could he find some connection with patients, but also be in a safer and controlled environment. He then moved on to work as a ward attendant in the psychiatric wards of a Veteran's Administration facility, where he worked until 30 December 1944. During this entire period he did not drink any alcohol.

=== Big Sur and Henry Miller ===
In the mid-1940s Winslow was in California, and spent time at Big Sur where he was close to Henry Miller, the two of them taking long walks together nearly every evening. In 1945 he helped Miller publish Aller Retour New York in pamphlet form. Miller describes how one morning Winslow woke him early to come and witness a strange phenomenon of what looked like twin stars gyrating near the horizon, and Miller goes on to talk about how there were subsequently many reports of 'flying saucers' in the area. Winslow's former wife Kathryn Winslow, with whom Walker had kept in touch, corresponding regularly, had met Miller at Big Sur in 1944, and four years later with her new husband William Mecham was to open a sort of bookstore devoted to selling his work, called “M, the studio for Henry Miller” in the area of Chicago's old Jackson Park art colony. Her biography of Miller, Henry Miller: Full of Life was published in 1986. In his time at Big Sur, Winslow was working on a new book. Henry Miller described Winslow's approach to work: "And then there was Walker Winslow, who was then writing If a Man Be Mad, which turned out to be a best seller. Walker wrote at top speed, and seemingly without interruption, in a tiny shack by the roadside which Emil White had built to house the steady stream of stragglers who were forever busting in on him for a day, a week, a month or a year." Walker had rented Emil's studio for $25 a month and Miller was reading each chapter as it came out of the typewriter.

=== If a Man be Mad ===
By 1947, Winslow was living in New Mexico, and in that year, under the pseudonym Harold Maine, his book If a Man Be Mad was published by Doubleday, and was subsequently brought out by Victor Gollancz Ltd, London, in 1952 and translated into French by Élisabeth Guertic (as Quand un homme est fou), being published in 1954 by Corrêa. In a newspaper review of the book, a clipping of which Winslow kept, and which is annotated with the name Albert Deutsch, presumably the reviewer, the book was described as "absorbing". The review says: "Written by an unusually sensitive artist, the book in many ways is more gripping and certainly more informative than the best-selling The Lost Week-End. Maine saw the insides of several mental hospitals as both patient and ward attendant; his revelations are well worth reading."

Winslow was going by the name Harold Maine in the late 1940s and Edna Manley (b.1908), whom he married following her divorce from the writer Ludwig Lewisohn, addressed letters to him under that name while he was still working at the Winter Veteran's Hospital in Topeka, Kansas in the middle of 1948. Winslow/Maine had initially been invited by Karl Menninger to present a lecture to the hospital staff on the subject of Ward Management. Menninger noted advance notification of the appearance of Harold Maine's article 'We Can Save the Mentally Sick?' in The Saturday Evening Post. Winslow was being represented by the New York literary agent Maxim Lieber during this period.

At the time of his initial involvement with the Topeka Hospital Winslow was living in Santa Fe, New Mexico, and Edna was writing to him from Rochester, New York. When Walker had first moved to Santa Fe, moving from Anderson Creek, he sent a telegram to Kathryn, who was at that time living and working in Los Alamos: "Arriving Santa Fe 2:30 Friday afternoon. Sober, solvent, and full of explanations. Reserve rooms." She met the bus and spent the weekend with him, but due to the restricted nature of Los Alamos she was unable to offer him a place to stay.

By late 1949 Walker was living in Pleasanton, California and Edna, continuing a pattern of the couple living separately, in Pacific Grove, California.

=== Menninger book ===
In 1951 Winslow was back in Big Sur, writing a book about the Menninger psychiatric clinic. When Miller's third wife, Janina Martha Lepska, returned to Big Sur in October 1951, not long before the couple finally divorces, Winslow helped Miller in his efforts to be a sole parent to the couple's two children, after it had been agreed that the children would spend six months with their father followed by six months with their mother.

The Menninger book appeared in 1956 where he had worked as a lay therapist. The book is chiefly a biography of Charles Frederick Menninger, but also brings the rest of his family into a skilfully constructed narrative.

=== Final years ===
Around 1961 Winslow was acting as the director of Beacon House, Monterey, California, which was a community rehabilitation center for alcoholics. By this time he was a respected counsellor in the treatment of alcoholics, but around 1963 he dropped out of sight and was eventually found holed up in an apartment and drinking heavily. For the remaining years of Winslow's life, his long time friend Henry Miller did what he could to help with money, and also to ensure that Walker received the appropriate hospital and institutional care.

In 1969 Walker Winslow was found dead in his apartment in Pacific Grove, California, having succumbed to pneumonia. He is buried in the El Carmelo Cemetery, Pacific Grove.

== Sources and bibliography ==
- Arthur Hoyle, The Unknown Henry Miller: A Seeker in Big Sur, (Skyhorse Publishing Inc, 2016)
- Robert E. Knoll (ed.), Weldon Kees and the Midcentury Generation, (Lincoln, University of Nebraska Press, 1986)
- Henry Miller, Big Sur and the Oranges of Hieronymus Bosch, (New York: New Directions, 1957)
- James Reidel, Vanished Act: The Life and Art of Weldon Kees, (Lincoln, University of Nebraska Press, 2003)
- Kathryn Winslow, Henry Miller: Full of Life, (New York, St Martin's Press, 1986)

== See also ==
- Menninger Foundation
