= Richard Lyons (writer) =

American poet

Richard Eugene Lyons
- Born: June 19, 1920; Detroit, Michigan
- Died: January 29, 2000 (aged 79)
- Education: English
- Occupations: Poet and professor
- Writing career
- Genre: Poetry

Richard Eugene Lyons (June 19, 1920 – January 29, 2000) was an American poet, and Professor of English at North Dakota State University from 1950 to 1982.

== Life ==
He joined with the newly organized North Dakota Institute for Regional Studies in its investigation of the culture, history, and heritage of North Dakota.

His poems have appeared in the Quarterly Review of Literature, The Kenyon Review, The New Yorker, The Paris Review, and The Nation. He was also a graphic artist who had paintings and prints in regional and national exhibitions.

His papers are held at North Dakota State University.

== Works ==
- Men and Tin Kettles, A. Swallow, 1956
- One Squeaking Straw (1958)
- Paintings in Taxicabs (1965)
- Above Time (1968)

=== Editor ===
- Poetry North: Five Poets of North Dakota (1970)
- Racer and Lame. Territorial Press. 1975.
- Invisible poems, Merrykit Press, 1976
- Scanning the Land: Poems in North Dakota. Fargo: North Dakota Institute for Regional Studies, 1980, ISBN 978-0-911042-23-8
