= Frances Park =

Public Park in Ingham County, Michigan, USA

- Interactive map of Frances Park
- Type: Public park
- Location: 2701 Moores River Dr; Lansing, Michigan
- Coordinates: 42.7175°N 84.59°W
- Area: 57.80 acres (23.39 ha)
- Operator: City of Lansing Parks and Recreation Department

Frances Park is a public park located in the fourth ward of the City of Lansing. The park is spans about 60 acres, and features a rose garden, playgrounds, a pitch for activities, a basketball court, a pavilion, and a paved trail around the perimeter of the park. The park is open to vehicles from May 1st through October 31st, and to pedestrians all year round. It is a common location for weddings.

== Gardens ==
Frances Park is well known for its Memorial Rose Garden, which contains a pergola, raised beds and planters with a variety of flowers, and rose beds. It also has a formal garden with shrub trees and tropical plants, as well as an overlook area for viewing the Grand River.

A photo taken within the Formal Garden of Frances Park, showing tropical plants and perennials.

== History ==
The park was willed to the City of Lansing in 1918 by James Henry Moores, and a trust was established for the purposes of improving the park. The trust allowed the park to open in 1957.
