= Thomas Parkinson =

American poet

Thomas F. Parkinson (1920–1992) was an American poet and professor of English at the University of California, Berkeley. He specialized in the poetry of W. B. Yeats, and was one of the first academics to write about the Beat poets and novelists of San Francisco in the 1950s and 1960s.

Parkinson was also a political activist for much of his life. He survived an assassination attempt in 1961 by a former student who sought to "get someone who was associated with Communism."

== Early life and influences ==
Parkinson's early life was affected by the Great Depression and the Second World War. He grew up in San Francisco; his father was a master-plumber union leader who was blacklisted during the general strike of the late 1930s. He attended Lowell High School and a junior college.

When World War II began, Parkinson enlisted in the Army, but was eventually discharged due to his height. In the years that followed, Parkinson worked a variety of jobs, including as an insurance agent, a ship's outfitter, and a lumberjack. He eventually returned to the Bay Area to study at UC Berkeley, where he completed his bachelor's degree. Parkinson received his master's degree and doctorate from UC Berkeley.

== Early career ==
While at Berkeley in the 1950s, Parkinson became involved in political activism. He was involved in KPFA-radio Berkeley when it was a free-form West Coast anarchist collective. Parkinson made a number of public statements criticizing the lack of funding for student scholarships, including those for women students.

Parkinson testified at the 1957 obscenity trial of Allen Ginsberg's poem Howl in support of Ginsberg and the poem.

== Attempted assassination ==
A former Berkeley student with serious mental illness named John Harrison Farmer compiled an assassination list of professors and other individuals on the campus he suspected of being communists or being part of the "liberal movement."

Farmer included Parkinson on the list due to statements he made in his courses and an article he published in campus newspaper, The Daily Californian.

On January 18, 1961, Farmer entered Parkinson's office in Dwinelle Hall where Parkinson was meeting with 19 year old graduate student and teaching assistant Stephen M. Thomas. Farmer shot both Parkinson and Thomas. Thomas was killed, though Parkinson survived with serious injuries; several of his vertebrae were fused and his face was permanently disfigured.

Farmer later admitted his target list included other notable Berkeley professors such as Richard Drinnon. Farmer was found to be insane and was committed to a mental hospital.

== Later career ==
After the murder attempt, Parkinson continued to promote liberal causes, served as campus Ombudsman, and chaired the Berkeley chapter of the American Association of University Professors (AAUP).

== Death ==
Parkinson died of a heart attack on January 15, 1992, at the age of 71.

== Publications ==
Parkinson published W. B. Yeats, Self-Critic in 1961 and W. B. Yeats, The Later Poetry in 1964, which established him as an authority on Yeats.

Parkinson was one of the first academic critics to promote the works of Beat writers like Allen Ginsberg, as well as writers John Montague and Robert Duncan. He published his Casebook on the Beats in 1961. He became part of the circle of writers, including Lawrence Ferlinghetti, that helped evolve the San Francisco literary culture of the 1960s. He also published on the correspondence of Hart Crane and Yvor Winters. His last book, Poets, Poems, Movements (1987), was a collection of essays.
