= George Leite =

American poet

- Leite in 1946
- Born: George Thurston Leite; December 20, 1920; Providence, Rhode Island, U.S.
- Died: August 6, 1985 (aged 64); Walnut Creek, California, U.S.
- Occupations: Writer; poet; publisher; bookseller; native plants nursery owner
- Spouse: Nancy Leite
- Children: George Daliel Leite
- Writing career
- Period: 1943–85
- Genres: Modernism, poetry, novel

George Thurston Leite (December 20, 1920 – August 6, 1985) was an American author, poet, publisher, bookstore, gallery, and native plants nursery owner active in California's San Francisco Bay Area starting in the 1940s. Born to a Portuguese-American family in Providence, Rhode Island in 1920, he was raised in San Leandro, California, a Bay Area city which was then a Portuguese enclave. His last name is the Portuguese word for milk. He died in 1985 in Walnut Creek, California.

Leite was the founder of daliel's Bookstore (stylized with a lowercase 'd') at 2466 Telegraph Avenue between Dwight and Haste Streets in Berkeley, where he published Circle Magazine and published books, pamphlets, and audio recordings under the Circle Editions imprint. Many of the important regional writers of the period such as Kenneth Rexroth were published by him, and daliel's Gallery was the site of concerts by composer Harry Partch and exhibitions by artist Jean Varda. He lived for a while near Henry Miller's cabin on the Big Sur coast.

Leite and novelist Jody Scott co-authored the novel cure it with honey (AKA I'll Get Mine) under the pseudonym Thurston Scott. It was published in 1951 and won the Mystery Writers of America Edgar Award for best first novel in 1952.
