= Lawrence Hart (poet) =

American poet

Lawrence Hart (1901 - 1996) was an American poet, critic, and mentor of the "Activist Group" of poets.

Hart was born in Delta, Colorado and moved to San Francisco in the 1920s. He married the poet Jeanne McGahey in 1944. He died, aged 95, on 13 May 1996 in Greenbrae, California.

The May 1951 edition of Poetry magazine was guest-edited by Hart and devoted to the work of the Activist Group, whose approach he defined as follows: "Each phrase, each unit of poetic notation, was to be written so that it would have esthetic excitement in itself, even detached from the poem." Poetry carried a half-issue "Activist Sequel" in November 1958, with a further "Note on the Activists" by Hart. In the following year, Hart stirred controversy by writing critically of the contemporary San Francisco Renaissance.
