= Sean Scully =

Irish artist (born 1945)

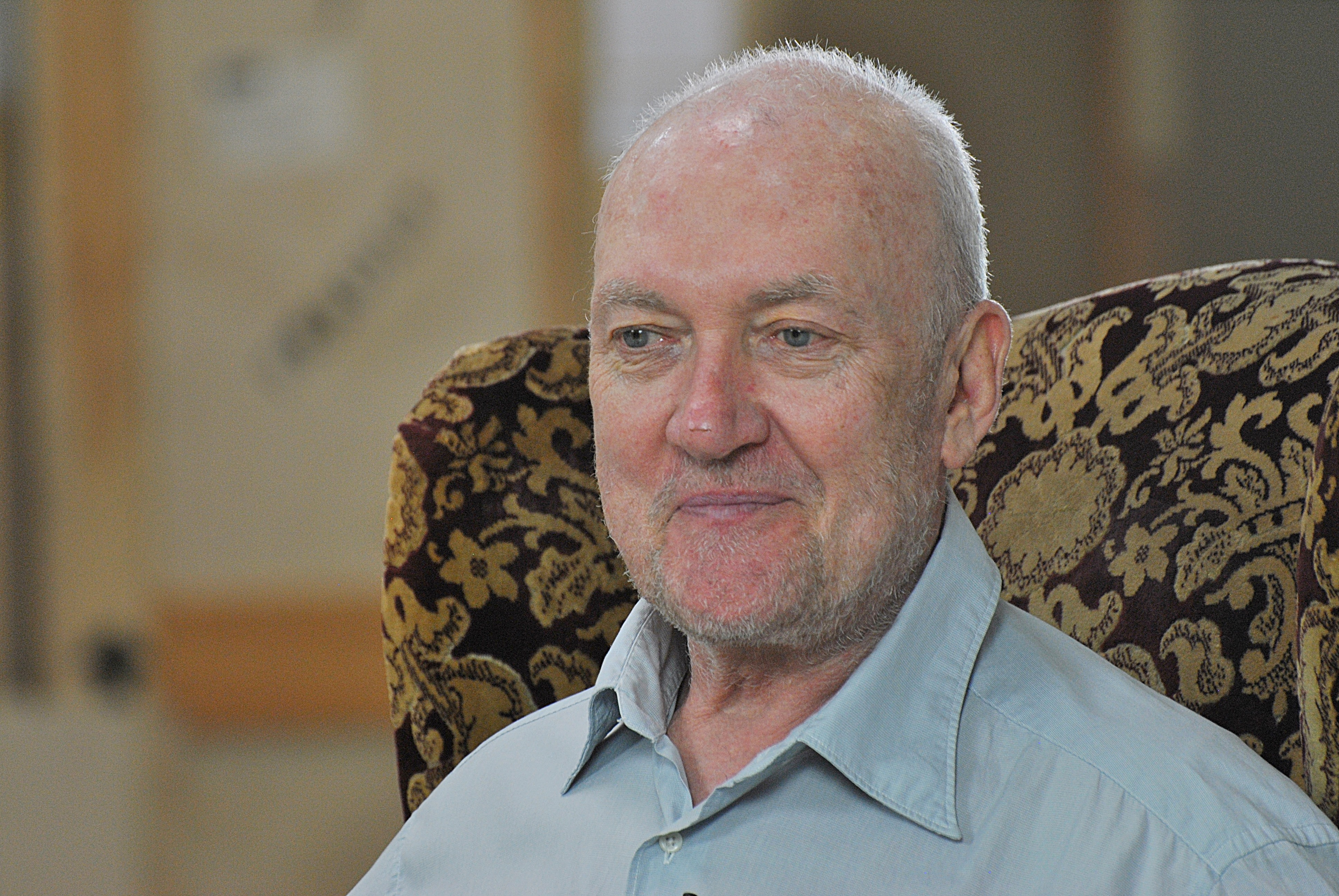
- Born: 30 June 1945 (age 81); Dublin, Ireland
- Education: Croydon College of Art (1965–1968); Newcastle University (1968–1972); Carpenter Center for the Visual Arts at Harvard University (1972–1973) (graduate fellowship)
- Known for: Painting, printmaking, sculpture, photography, art and writing
- Movement: Geometric abstraction and emotional abstraction

Sean Scully RA (born 30 June 1945) is an Irish-born American-based artist working as a painter, printmaker, sculptor and photographer. His work is held in museum collections worldwide and he has twice been named a Turner Prize nominee. Moving from London to New York in 1975, Scully helped lead the transition from Minimalism to Emotional abstraction in painting, abandoning the reduced vocabulary of Minimalism in favour of a return to metaphor and spirituality in art.

Scully has also been a lecturer and professor at a number of universities and his writing and teachings are collected in the 2016 book Inner: The Collected Writings and Selected Interviews of Sean Scully.

== Early life ==
Sean Scully was born in Dublin, Ireland, on 30 June 1945. Four years later his family moved to London, where they lived in a working-class part of South London, moving from lodging to lodging for a number of years. By the age of 9, Scully knew he wanted to become an artist, and from the age of 15 until he was 17, Scully was apprenticed at a commercial printing shop in London as a typesetter, an experience that greatly influenced the art to come.

From the age of 17 until he turned 20, despite working full-time in various jobs including graphic design, and messenger, Scully attended evening classes at the Central School of Art, focused on figurative painting. While working a stint as a plasterer's labourer on the Victoria Station Ballroom, Scully made daily visits to the Tate Milbank to visit Van Gogh's Chair (1888), which made an impression on him. In 1963, at the age of 18, Scully had a job loading trucks with flattened boxes at a cardboard factory. The idea of stacking central to much of his work came from this experience.

=== Education ===
In September 1965 Sean Scully, age 20, began to study full-time at Croydon College of Art, London. As part of his course he attended Camberwell School of Art to study printmaking. He then moved on to Newcastle University in 1968. At Newcastle University, the University Theatre's production of Samuel Beckett’s Waiting for Godot made a lasting impact on him. Scully was also influenced by a trip to Morocco in 1969, where he became fascinated by the multi-colored stripes locals wove into wool tents and robes. Scully was awarded the Frank Knox Memorial Fellowship in 1972 to attend Harvard University. It was during this first stay in the US that Scully began to experiment with new techniques such as tape and spray paint.

== Career ==
=== Early career: 1970–1980 ===
Scully's first commercial show, at the Rowan Gallery in London, sold out. During this period Scully taught at the Chelsea College of Art and Design, and Goldsmith's, while continuing to paint in his Elephant Lane studio in Rotherhithe. In 1975, at the age of 30, Scully was awarded a two-year Harkness Fellowship with which he moved to New York.

Once in New York, he began to develop important friendships with fellow artists such as Robert Ryman, and others in academic and artistic circles. Scully's response in the 1970s had been to bring the objectives of American Minimalism together with those of Op art, an important current in Europe, creating works using overlays and “supergrids” that bridged these two artistic movements in a new way. Once in New York, Minimalism had a strong influence on his work, and for a few years, Scully's palette was reduced to the grey monochrome ‘Black paintings’ series.

Scully began working on the series known as The Catherine Paintings in 1979, while sharing his Duane Street studio with his third wife, the artist Catherine Lee. The idea behind the series was to choose the important painting Scully produced during each year together, that would then become part of a collection named after her. This was the beginning of Sean's own private collection of his work.

=== Departure from Minimalism: 1980–1982 ===
Backs and Fronts, 1981, oil on linen and canvas. Kerlin Gallery, Dublin.

By 1980 Scully considered himself to be at war with the movement of Minimalism in New York and wanted to bring more human elements into his art. He made multiple trips to Morocco and Mexico during this time, as he considered these trips to have “a direct bearing on what I think art should be doing – which is concentrating on what’s interesting, engaging, perverse, and beautiful about human nature.” He later commented that “I had decided that what had been stripped out of painting—i.e., the ability to make relationships, to be metaphorical and referential, spiritual, poetic, all those things and aspects of human nature—had to be put back in if painting was to go forward.” In 1981 the first retrospective of Sean Scully's work was held at the Ikon Gallery in Birmingham. This was also the year that Scully's confidence to withdraw from adherence to Minimalism became apparent, with the return of color and space, and the freehand drawing of stripes and visible brushstrokes, rather than the hard lines of tape. Scully had a breakthrough with the seminal 1981 painting Backs and Fronts, which had a profound impact in the 1982 exhibition 'Critical Perspectives' at the PS1 Contemporary Art Center. This was a watershed painting which British conceptual artist Gillian Wearing has said “broke the logjam of American minimalist painting”.

=== Geometric Abstraction: 1982–present ===
In 1982 Scully began to work with the gallerist David McKee, an important relationship that lasted for a decade. During the summer of that year, Scully started producing small multi-panel works on found pieces of wood while staying in Montauk at the Edward Albee artist's colony. These works were titled Ridge, Plum, and Bear after the islands that surround Long Island. He also began applying a combination of rigid geometry and expressive texture and colour to larger paintings that year. A prime example of this was Heart of Darkness, inspired by the 1899 novella of the same name. Scully began collaborating with Mohammad O. Khalil in 1983, this was the first time he had collaborated with a printmaker and was the start of a career-long commitment to printmaking. That same year, Scully was awarded a Guggenheim Fellowship for Fine Arts.

In 1984, the Museum of Modern Art included Scully in their International Survey of Recent Painting and Sculpture. The following year Scully's first American solo museum exhibition was held at the Museum of Art, Carnegie Institute in 1985, and traveled to the Museum of Fine Arts, Boston. Other major museums also began to acquire Scully's large-scale paintings, despite the dominant trend of the time tending towards Postmodernism. Scully's paintings from this period are heavy and physical in terms of both size and aesthetic, and make use of large-scale stretchers.

By 1987, Scully's work became less complex, flatter and smaller in scale, and began to include lighter color palettes beginning with Pale Fire in 1988. The same year, while experimenting with watercolours on a beach in Mexico, Scully created the first image that would become an extended meditation on architecture and light with the Wall of Light series. In 1989 the Whitechapel Gallery in London held a solo exhibition for Scully, which then travelled to Palacio Velázquez in Madrid and to the Städtische Galerie im Lenbachhaus in Munich. These were Scully's first solo exhibitions in mainland Europe. The art critic Robert Hughes' 1989 piece for TIME magazine cemented Scully's increasing reputation.

The painting Why and What (Yellow) in 1988 was the first to incorporate an inset element of steel. By 1991 Scully expanded the use of steel, setting oil on linen insets into large steel panels. He also began the regular use of a checkerboard motif at this time, first hinted at in his Taped and Hidden Drawing paintings of the mid-1970s. In 1992, while teaching at Harvard University, Sean Scully revisited Morocco to film the BBC documentary The Artist's Journey: Sean Scully on Henri Matisse, with Matisse having visited Morocco in 1912–1913. 1993 saw the first exhibition of The Catherine Paintings, at the Modern Art Museum of Fort Worth, Texas. In 1994 he opened a second studio in Barcelona, and he returned to Morocco in 1995, to spend more time in the country. Atlas Walls is a portfolio of Scully's photographic works taken during this trip.

In 1995 Scully returned to New York, moving into a large new studio in Chelsea, Manhattan. Chelsea Wall was the first painting to be made there. Scully received a number of invitations to speak at academic institutions, and participated in the Joseph Beuys lectures on the state of contemporary art in Britain, Europe and the US, held by the Ruskin School at Oxford University, England. In 1997, Scully's photography was exhibited for the first time at the Sala de Exposiciones Rekalde in Bilbao, Spain.

Scully participated in a colloquium in conjunction with the exhibition of Richard Pousette-Dart at the Metropolitan Museum of Art in 1998. He visited Santo Domingo in 1999, resulting in the photography portfolio Santa Domingo for Nené. That year, Scully's prints were given a retrospective at the Graphische Sammlung Albertina, in Vienna, Austria, and the Musée du Dessin et de l’Estampe Originale in Gravelines. A catalogue raisonné of his prints from 1969 to 1999 was also published.

=== 2001–2013 ===
In 2001, the Modern Art Museum of Fort Worth acquired the complete Catherine series, eighteen paintings that each represent a year from the period 1979–1996, which was given a dedicated room for permanent exhibition in the new Museum building opened in 2002. In 2002 Scully was appointed Professor of Painting at the Academy of Fine Arts, Munich, a position he held through to 2007. A retrospective exhibition opened in 2004 at the Sara Hildén Art Museum in Tampere, Finland, which travelled to Klassik Stiftung Weimar, in Germany, and the National Gallery of Australia. While in Australia, Scully spent time travelling through the red desert interior.

Raval Rojo, 2004, oil on linen, 92 x 102 cm, Kerlin Gallery, Dublin

Between 2005 and 2006, Sean Scully's Wall of Light series was displayed at museums around the United States. This began with the exhibition Sean Scully: Wall of Light opened at The Phillips Collection, Washington D.C., and travelled to the Modern Art Museum of Fort Worth, the Cincinnati Art Museum, and finally the Metropolitan Museum of Fine Art to great acclaim. The same year Scully travelled with a group of students from the Art Academy in Munich, to Inisheer, an island off the Irish coast. It was here that the Aran portfolio of photographs were taken. In 2006 the Hugh Lane Gallery opened The Sean Scully Room, a dedicated, permanent installation of the artist's work, and the Bibliothèque nationale de France held an exhibition of his prints. Sean Scully: A Retrospective opened in 2007 at the Fundació Joan Miró, Barcelona, and travelled to the Musée d'art moderne (Saint-Étienne), and the Museo d’Arte Contemporanea Roma (MACRO) in Rome. The National Gallery of Art in Washington D.C. invited Scully to give the Elson Lecture in 2007.

The retrospective exhibition Constantinople or the Sensual Concealed: The Imagery of Sean Scully opened in 2009 at the MKM Museum Küppersmühlefür Moderne Kunst, in Duisburg, Germany, and travelled to the Ulster Museum, Belfast. In 2010 a tour of important early works from the 1980s started at the Centre for Contemporary Arts, Carlow, Ireland, and then travelled to the Leeds Art Gallery, and the Wilhelm-Hack-Museum in Ludwigshafen am Rhein. In 2011 the Chazen Museum of Art opened their new expansion of the museum with a solo exhibition of Scully's eight-part Liliane paintings on aluminum, and other works. Scully opened nine more solo museum exhibitions in 2012, including Notations: Sean Scully at the Philadelphia Museum of Art, as well as exhibitions at museums like MIMA, Kunstmuseum Bern, the Lentos Kunstmuseum in Linz, and IVAM in Valencia, Spain.

=== Reception in China and new projects: 2014–2017 ===
In 2014, Scully opened a new studio space set on three acres in Tappan, New York, where he continued to extend the Landline series of paintings begun in 2000. That same year, Scully opened fourteen solo exhibitions around the world, including the first major retrospective by a western artist in China. The exhibition, entitled Follow the Heart: The Art of Sean Scully, opened in Beijing. The exhibition included China Piled-Up, a new monumental sculpture in corten-steel, and travelled from the Shanghai Himalayas Museum to the CAFA Art Museum in Beijing, to critical acclaim. Another outdoor sculpture Boxes Full of Air was commissioned at Chateau La Coste in France.

Landline Orient, 2016. Private collection.

Scully participated in the Venice Biennale for the first time, in 2015, with the solo exhibition Land Sea at the Palazzo Falier in Venice. The Museum Liaunig, in Neuhaus, Austria, opened its new building expansion with Sean Scully: Painting as an Imaginative World Appropriation. To honour his long-term friendship with art critic Arthur Danto who died in 2013, Scully published the book Danto on Scully, bringing together the series of five essays Danto had written on the artist over the previous 20 years.

In 2015 Scully completed his restoration of the 10th Church of Santa Cecília de Montserrat in Spain, and opened it to the public. Commissioned by the Museum of Montserrat to make a holistic artistic intervention in the sacred space, Scully not only permanently installed paintings but worked on site-specific frescoes, and the design of the altar and cross. The chapel is now both a working church, and also the Espai d’Art Sean Scully. Scully was awarded the V Congreso Asociacion Protecturi for his contribution to Spanish religious heritage

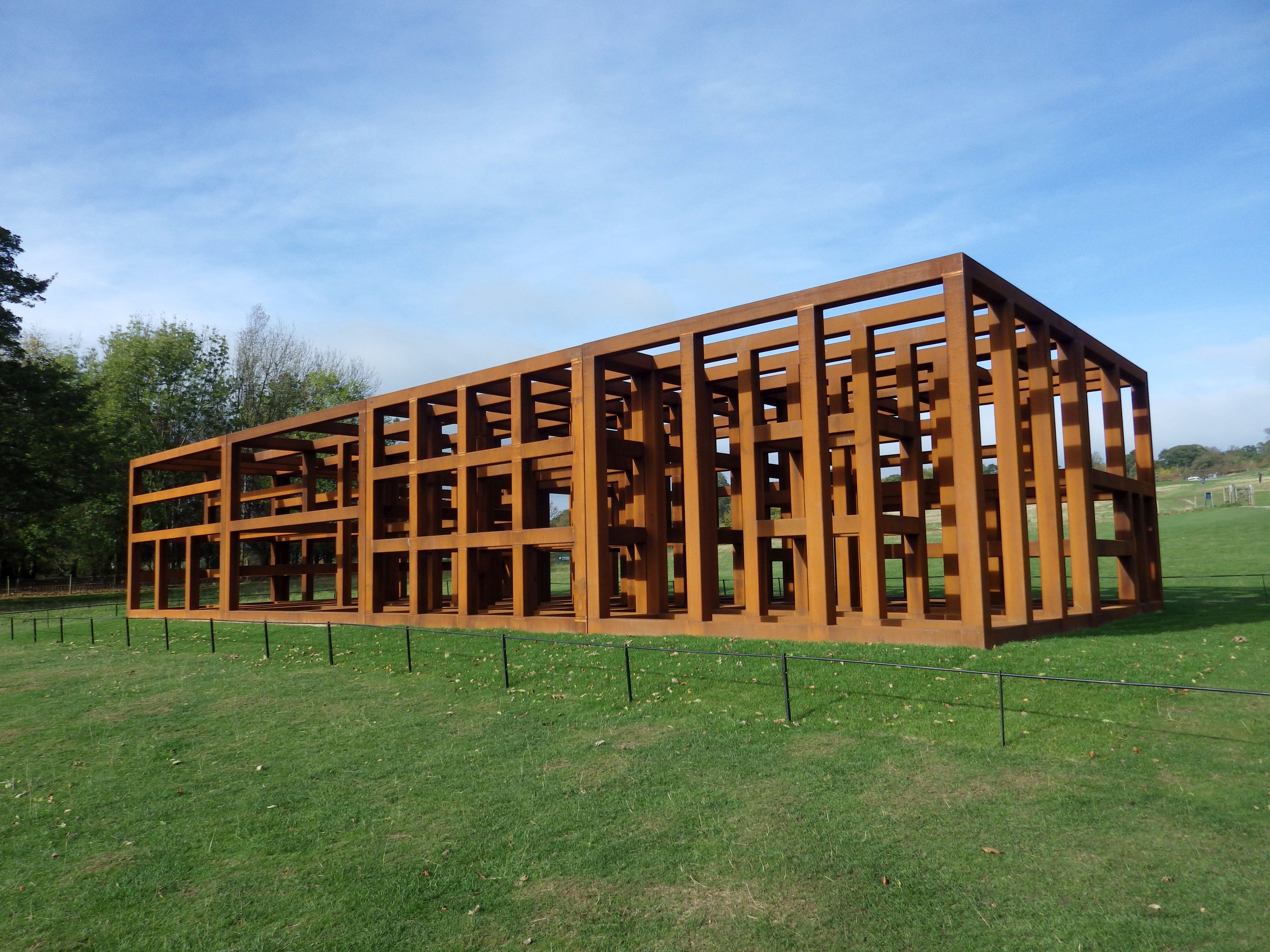
Crate of Air, 2018. At the Inside Outside exhibition in Yorkshire Sculpture Park in 2018.

In 2016 Scully's second major exhibition in China, Sean Scully: Resistance and Persistence, opened at the Art Museum of the Nanjing University of the Arts, and travelled to the Guangdong Museum and the Hubei Museum in Wuhan. In the same year, as well as solo museum exhibitions in České Budějovice, Czech Republic, and Valencia, Spain, the artist put together two exhibitions of works from specific early periods in his private collection, one of works from the 1970s, in an off-site space in Ridgewood, Queens with Cheim & Read, and another of works from the 1980s with Mnuchin Gallery. Inspired by revisiting his earlier works, Scully began to reemploy techniques such as spray painting, which he first introduced in the late 1960s.

Over the course of 2015–2017, Scully's work expanded in two particular directions: sculpture and figuration. During this period, Scully began working on sculptural projects, including the Tower series using various materials such as corten steel, marble, and stainless steel, and the Stack series in both raw and painted steel were introduced. A new series of Block paintings was begun, in which Scully self-referenced his sculpture in paint. This new direction was the focus of the solo exhibition Wall of Light Cubed at Cheim & Read, NY. Scully also revisited his early exploration in figuration from the late 1960s in a series of figurative paintings titled Eleuthera which was completed between 2015 and 2017. The series was inspired by Scully's son Oisin, and was named after the island of Eleuthera in the Bahamas and the feminine Greek adjective ἐλεύθερος (eleútheros), meaning "free".

=== 2018 ===
2018 saw Scully have a total of fourteen public exhibitions around the world. This included the installation of the monumental sculpture Boxes of Air in the Cuadra San Cristóbal, in Mexico City, along with paintings installed in the horse stalls of the iconic pink stable block. Other museum shows included: Multimedia Art Museum, Moscow; Hatton and Laing Galleries, Newcastle, UK; De Pont Museum of Contemporary Art, Tilburg, Netherlands; Russian Museum, St Petersburg, Russia; Staatliche Kunsthalle Karlsruhe, Germany; Yorkshire Sculpture Park, UK, among many others.

=== 2019 ===
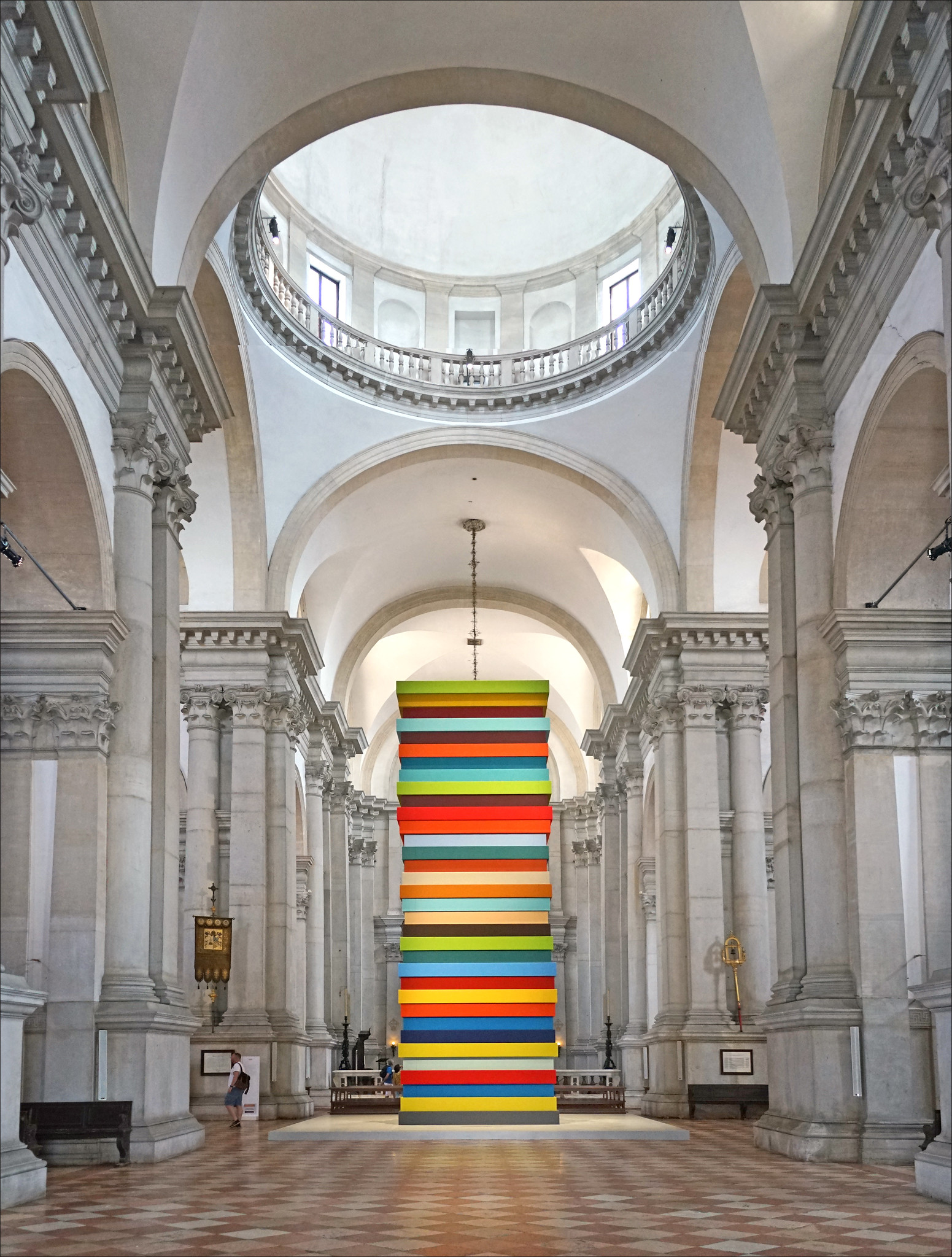
Opulent Ascension, 2019, sculpture. Basilica of San Giorgio Maggiore, Venice.

In 2019, the exhibition Sean Scully: Sea Star opened at The National Gallery, London, showcasing Scully's work alongside works by J. M. W. Turner. On 6 April 2019, director Nick Willing's documentary film Unstoppable. Sean Scully & The Art of Everything aired nationally in the UK on BBC Two. For the 58th Venice Biennale, Scully presented Sean Scully: Human at the Basilica of San Giorgio Maggiore, an exhibition of recent paintings and a new sculpture titled Opulent Ascension under the dome of the late Renaissance church by Andrea Palladio.

=== 2020s ===
From 11 May to 21 September 2025, the Parrish Art Museum exhibited “Sean Scully: The Albee Barn, Montauk,” a survey of Scully’s art created between 1981 and 2024, including the month he spent in Montauk in the summer of 1982. The catalog was published by Hatje Cantz (ISBN 978-3-775-75942-7).

From 8 October 2025 to 14 December 2025, the Estorick Collection of Modern Italian Art exhibited Sean Scully: Mirroring "showcasing a body of his work alongside that of Italian master Giorgio Morandi." The exhibit displayed paintings, etchings and sculptures created between 1964 and the present.

== Critical reception ==
Arthur Danto wrote that “Sean Scully’s name belongs on the shortest of short lists of the major painters of our time”, continuing that "Scully’s historical importance lies in the way he has brought the great achievement of Abstract Expressionist painting into the contemporary moment – and in a way overcome the terms of the paragon that sent painting into exile."

=== Prizes and awards ===
Scully has been a member of Aosdána since 2001, and the Royal Academy of Arts since 2013. Scully received an Honorary Doctor of Fine Arts degree from both Massachusetts College of Art and the National University of Ireland in 2003, and a Doctor of Letters degree from Newcastle University. He received an Honorary Doctorate from Miguel Hernández University in 2006 and 2008.

List of awards and prizes, including year, association, and result
Year	Award	Result
1970	Peter Stuyvesant Foundation Prize	Won
1972	John Moores Painting Prize	2nd place prize
1974	John Moores Painting Prize	4th place prize
1975	Harkness Fellowship	Won
1983	National Endowment for the Arts Fellowship	Won
1983	Guggenheim Fellowship	Won
1989	Turner Prize	Nominated
1993	Turner Prize	Nominated
2000	Honorary Fellow of the London Institute of Arts & Letters	Won
2015	V Congreso Asociacion Protecturi	Won
2016	GAC Honorary Award	Won
2016	Harper's Bazaar International Artist of the Year Award	Won

== Other works ==
=== Music ===
Scully's mother Holly was a vaudeville singer, and Scully became heavily influenced by rhythm and blues in his adolescence. Scully owned and ran an R&B club as a teenager in South London, and was briefly in an R&B band with his brother and a friend.

In 2016 the percussionist Billy Martin from the band Medeski Martin & Wood made a performative collaboration with Sean Scully's monumental corten steel sculpture Boxes of Air at Scully's Tappan studio. It culminated in ‘Boxing for Sean’, a 6 movement percussion composition performed live outdoors.

In 2019 the duo Merzouga released a 46-minute sound composition, "The Language of Light - Music to the Work of Sean Scully" (YLE/DLF 2019) featuring the texts and the voice of Scully. Its premiere broadcast was on 3 December 2019 at 9pm local time on Finnish broadcaster Yleisradio. German nationwide broadcaster Deutschlandfunk co-produced the piece; the German broadcast was scheduled for February 2020.

=== Writing ===
Scully first began writing about art and his own work in the 1980s, although he only truly began to include writing as part of his practice from 1996 onwards. 2016 saw the publication of Inner: the collected writings and selected interviews of Sean Scully, by HatjeCantz.

== Personal life ==
Scully became a father at the age of 19, with the birth of his son Paul on 7 May 1965. Paul later died in a car accident in 1983 at the age of 18. While at Newcastle University, Scully met Rosemary Purnell, a fellow student in the Painting Department, they married in 1971 and later divorced. Scully married artist Catherine Lee in 1978, the two divorced in 1998. In 2006, he married artist Liliane Tomasko, his fourth wife. Their son Oisin Scully was born in 2009.

== Public collections ==
=== United States and South America ===
- Ackland Art Museum, University of North Carolina – Chapel Hill, NC
- Albright–Knox Art Gallery – Buffalo, NY
- Art Institute of Chicago – Chicago, IL
- Art Gallery of Ontario – Ontario, Canada
- The Broad Art Foundation – Los Angeles, CA
- Carnegie Museum of Art – Pittsburgh, PA
- Iris & B. Gerald Cantor Center for Visual Arts, Stanford University – Stanford, CA
- Carpenter Center for the Visual Arts – Harvard University, Cambridge, MA
- Centro Cultural de Arte Contemporaneo – Mexico City, Mexico
- Chase Manhattan Bank – New York, NY
- Chemical Bank – New York, NY
- Cincinnati Art Museum – Cincinnati, OH
- Cleveland Museum of Art – Cleveland, OH
- Contemporary Museum – Honolulu, HI
- Corcoran Gallery of Art – Washington, D.C.
- Dallas Museum of Art – Dallas, TX
- David Winton Bell Gallery, List Art Center, Brown University, Providence, RI
- Denver Art Museum – Denver, CO
- Des Moines Art Center – Des Moines, IA
- De Young Museum – San Francisco, CA
- First Bank Minneapolis – Minneapolis, MN
- Fogg Art Museum, Harvard University – Cambridge, MA
- Ft. Lauderdale Museum of Art – Ft. Lauderdale, FL
- Glenstone – Potomac, MD
- Guggenheim Museum – New York, NY
- Hirshhorn Museum and Sculpture Garden – Washington, D.C.
- High Museum of Art – Atlanta, GA
- Hood Museum of Art – Hanover, NH
- Kemper Museum of Contemporary Art – Kansas City, MO
- Los Angeles County Museum of Art – Los Angeles, CA
- Modern Art Museum of Fort Worth – Fort Worth, TX
  - Catherine Series
- BNY Mellon Center – Pittsburgh, PA
- Metropolitan Museum of Art – New York, NY
- Miami Art Museum – Miami, FL
- Mount Holyoke College Art Museum – South Hadley, MA
- Museo de Arte Contemporaneo – Caracas, Venezuela
- Museo de Arte Contemporaneo – Monterrey, Mexico
- Museo de Arte Moderno – Col. Bosques de Chapultepec, Mexico
- Museo de Arte Moderno – Mexico City, Mexico
- Museum of Fine Art, Boston – Boston MA
- Museum of Fine Arts, Houston – Houston, TX
- Museum of Modern Art – New York, NY
- National Gallery of Art – Washington, D.C.
  - 8.10.89 (1989)
- Orlando Museum of Art – Orlando, FL
- Paine Webber Group, Inc. – New York, NY
- Philip Morris, Inc. – New York, NY
- The Phillips Collection - Washington, D.C.
- Princeton University Art Museum, Princeton, NJ
- Rose Art Museum, Brandeis University, Waltham, MA
- Santa Barbara Museum of Art – Santa Barbara, CA
- Seattle Museum of Art – Seattle, WA
- Sheldon Memorial Art Gallery and Sculpture Garden, University of Nebraska – Lincoln, NE
- Smith College Museum of Art – Northampton, MA
- Smithsonian American Art Museum – Washington, DC
  - Works in the SAAM collection
- Raclin Murphy Museum of Art – Notre Dame, IN
- San Diego Museum of Art – San Diego, CA
- Saint Louis Art Museum – Saint Louis, MO
- Speed Art Museum — Louisville, KY
- Van Cliburn Foundation, Fort Worth, TX
- Walker Art Center – Minneapolis, MN
- Whitney Museum of Modern Art, New York, NY
- Yale University Art Gallery – New Haven, CT

=== Europe ===
- Abbot Hall Art Gallery – Kendal, England
- Academy of Fine Arts, Munich – Munich, Germany
- Albertina – Vienna, Austria
- Arts Council of Great Britain – London, England
- AXA Belgique – Brussels, Belgium
- Banque Européenne d'Investissement – Luxembourg
- BAWAG – Vienna, Austria
- Bavarian State Painting Collections – Munich, Germany
- Bibliothèque nationale de France – Paris, France
- Birmingham Museum of Art – Birmingham, England
- British Council – London, England
- Centre national des arts plastiques – Paris, France
- Ceolfrith Art Center – Sunderland, England
- Château Lynch-Bages – Pauillac, France
- Museo Chillida-Leku, – Hernani, Spain
- Coleccion Conei, Barcelona, Spain
- Consejería de cultura – Santander, Spain
- Contemporary Arts Society – London, England
- Council of National Academic Awards – London, England
- Crawford Art Gallery – Cork, Ireland
  - East Coast Light I (1973)
- Centre de la gravure et de l'image imprimee, La Louvière – Brussels, Belgium
- Daimler Art Collection – Stuttgart, Germany
- Deutsche Bank – London, UK
- DZ Bank AG Kunst sammlung / KMMM – Frankfurt, Germany
- Eastern Arts Association – Cambridge, England
- Ecole d’Arts Plastiques – Châtellerault, France
- Espace de l’Art Concret – Mouans-Sartoux, France
- EMMA, ESPOO, Museum of Modern Art – Helsinki, Finland
- Fitzwilliam Museum – Cambridge, England
- La Fondation Edelman – Lausanne, Switzerland
- Fondation Urvasco – Vittoria, Spain
- Foundation Stiftelsen Focus – Borås, Sweden
- CaixaForum Barcelona – Barcelona, Spain
- Fundació Allorda-Derksen – Barcelona, Spain
- Fundación Caixa Galicia - La Coruña, Spain
- Gallery of Modern Art László Vass Collection – Veszprém, Hungary
- Gertsev Collection – Moscow, Russia
- Hôtel des Arts - Toulon, France
- Hunterian Art Gallery – Glasgow, Scotland
- Hugh Lane Gallery – Dublin, Ireland
  - Works in the Hugh Lane collection
- Institut Valencià d'Art Modern (IVAM) – Valencia, Spain
- Irish Museum of Modern Art (IMMA) – Dublin, Ireland
- Kunsthalle Bielefeld – Bielefeld, Germany
- Kunstmuseum Lentos Linz – Linz, Austria
- Kunstsammlung Nordrhein-Westfalen – Düsseldorf, Germany
- Kunsthaus Zürich – Zürich, Switzerland
- Kunst und Museumsverein Wuppertal – Wuppertal, Germany
- Laing Art Gallery – Newcastle, England
- László Vass Collection – Veszprém, Hungary
- Leicestershire Educational Authority – Leicester, England
- Louisiana Museum of Modern Art – Humlebaek, Denmark
- The Maramotti Collection – Reggio Emilia, Italy
- Manchester Art Gallery – Manchester, England
- Museum Folkwang – Essen, Germany
- Musée d'Art Contemporain du Val-de-Marne – Vitry-sur-Seine, France
- Musée d'art moderne (Saint-Étienne) – Saint-Étienne, France
- Musee du Dessin et de l'Estampe Originale – Gravelines, France
- Musée Jenisch – Vevey, Switzerland
- Musee National d´Art Moderne, Centre Georges Pompidou – Paris, France
- Musee de Roland-Garros – Paris, France
- Museo d'Arte Moderna di Bologna (MAMBO) – Bologna, Italy
- Museo Nacional Centro de Arte Reina Sofía – Madrid, Spain
- Barcelona Museum of Contemporary Art – Barcelona, Spain
- Mumok, Stiftung Ludwig – Vienna, Austria
- Museum Pfalzgalerie – Kaiserslautern, Germany
- National Museum Cardiff – Cardiff, Wales
- Northern Arts Association – Newcastle-Upon-Tyne, England
- Norwich Castle – Norwich, England
- Open Museum, Environmental & Heritage Resource Centre, Leicestershire, England
- Pier Arts Centre – Orkney, Scotland
- Ruhr University Bochum – Bochum, Germany
- Saastamoisen Saatio – Helsinki, Finland
- Sala Rekalde – Bilbao, Spain
- Sammlung Essl – Vienna, Austria
- Sara Hilden Art Museum – Tampere, Finland
- Staatsgalerie Stuttgart – Stuggart, Germany
- Staatliche Museen Kassel, Neue Galerie – Kassel, Germany
- Staatliche Graphische Sammlung München, Munich, Germany
- Lenbachhaus – Munich, Germany
- Tate Modern – London, England
  - Works in the Tate collection
- The UBS Art Collection – Zürich/Basel, Switzerland
- Ulster Museum – Belfast, Northern Ireland
- Northumbria University – Newcastle, England
- Victoria and Albert Museum – London, England
- Von der Heydt Museum – Wuppertal, Germany
- Whitworth Art Gallery – Manchester, England
- Willy Michel Collection, Museum Franz Gertsch – Burgdorf, Switzerland
- ZKM Center for Art and Media Karlsruhe (ZKM) – Karlsruhe, Germany
- University of Limerick – Limmerick, Ireland

=== Australia ===
- Art Gallery of New South Wales – Sydney, Australia
- National Gallery of Australia – Canberra, Australia
- National Gallery of Victoria – Felton Bequest – Melbourne, Australia
- Power Institute of Contemporary Art – Sydney, Australia

=== Japan ===
- Bridgestone Museum of Art, Ishibashi Foundation – Tokyo
- Nagoya City Art Museum – Nagoya
- Tokyo International Forum – Tokyo

== Bibliography ==
=== Selected works about Scully ===
List of works about Sean Scully showing year and language of publication, and publisher
Year	Title	Author	Publisher
1990	Sean Scully: English	Maurice Poirier	Hudson Hills Press
1991	Sean Scully: Prints from the Garner Tullis Workshop: English	David Carrier	Garner Tullis
2004	Sean Scully: English	David Carrier	Thames and Hudson
2004	The Color of Time. The Photographs of Sean Scully: English	Arthur Danto Mila Finemane Edward Lucie-Smith	Steidl
2006	Sean Scully: French	Philippe Monsel	Éditions Cercle D’Art
2007	Sean Scully: Spanish	Pilar Escanerode Miguel	Thames and Hudson
2007	Glorious Dust: English	John Yau	Steidl
2009	Kunstwerkstatt Sean Scully: German	Helmut Friedel	Prestel Verlag
2015	Danto on Scully: English	Daniel Herwitz and Arthur Danto	HatjeCantzVerlag/Cheim and Read
2017	‘Painting Earns Its Stripes’ and other essays: English/Chinese	Arthur Danto	Shanghai Fine Arts Publisher

=== Selected works by Sean Scully ===
List of works by Sean Scully showing year and language of publication, co-authors, and publisher
Year	Title	Co-author(s)	Publisher
1998	Mark Rothko: Corps de Lumière: French; 31 pages		L’Échoppe
2006	Sean Scully: Resistance and Persistence: Selected Writings: English	Florence Ingleby	Merrell Publishers
2007	Sean Scully: Walls of Aran: English	Colm Tóibín	Thames and Hudson
2007	Sean Scully: Cuerpos de luz/Bodies of Light: English/Spanish		Fundación Juan March
2008	Sean Scully: La surface peinte: French		Daniel Lelong Éditeur
2016	Inner: The Collected Writings and Selected Interviews of Sean Scully: English	Kelly Grovier	Hatje Cantz Verlag
2019	Sean Scully: Walls of Aran, Compact Edition: English	Colm Tóibín	Thames and Hudson

=== Solo and two-person exhibition catalogues ===
Year	Author	Exhibition	Publisher	
1975	William Feaver	Sean Scully. Paintings 1974	La Tortue Gallery, Santa Monica	
1981	Joseph Masheck, Sam Hunter	Sean Scully. Paintings 1971-1981	Ikon Gallery, Birmingham	
1985	John Caldwell, David Carrier, Amy Lighthill	Sean Scully	Museum of Art, Carnegie Institute	
1986	Joseph Masheck	Sean Scully. Paintings 1985-1986	David McKee Gallery	
1987	Pamela Auchincloss	Sean Scully. Monotypes from the Garner Tullis Workshop	Pamela Auchincloss Gallery, New York	
1987	Mari Rantanen	Sean Scully/Harvey Quaytman	Helsinki Festival, Helsinki	
1987	Susanne Lambrecht	Sean Scully	Galerie Schmela/Mayor Rowan Gallery, Düsseldorf/London	
1988	Neil Benezra	Sean Scully	Art Institute of Chicago, Chicago	
1988	John Loughery	Sean Scully	Fuji Television Gallery, Tokyo	
1989		Sean Scully. Paintings 1987-1988	David McKee Gallery, New York	
1989	Carter Ratcliff	Sean Scully. Paintings and Works on Paper 1982-88	Whitechapel Gallery, London	
1990		Sean Scully. Paintings 1989-1990	David McKee Gallery, New York	
1990		Sean Scully. Monotypes from the Garner Tullis Workshop	David McKee Gallery, New York	
1990		Sean Scully	Galerie De France, Paris	
1990		Sean Scully/Donald Sultan: Abstraction/Representation	Stanford University Museum of Art, Stanford	
1991	Carter Ratcliff	Sean Scully	Jamileh Weber Gallery, Zurich	
1992		Sean Scully. Woodcuts	Garner Tullis, New York	
1992	Paul Bonaventura	Sean Scully	Waddington Custot, London	
1993	Carter Ratcliff, Arthur Danto, Steven Henry Madoff	Sean Scully. The Catherine Paintings	Modern Art Museum of Fort Worth, Fort Worth	
1993	Armin Zweite	Sean Scully. Paintings and Works on Paper	Galerie Bernd Klüser, Munich	
1994	Demetrio Paparoni	Sean Scully. The light in the darkness	Fuji Television Gallery, Tokyo	
1994	Francisco Jarauta	Sean Scully. Obragráfica 1991-1994	Galeria DV, San Sebastian	
1995	Jean Frémon	Sean Scully. “Place.”	Galerie Lelong, Paris	
1995	Hans-Michael Herzong	Sean Scully. The Catherine Paintings	Kunsthalle Bielefeld, Bielefeld	
1995	Enrique Juncosa	Sean Scully	Waddington Galleries, London	
1995	Ned Rifkin, Victoria Combalia, Lynne Cooke, Armin Zweite	Sean Scully. Twenty Years, 1976-1995	High Museum of Art, Atlanta	
1995	Ned Rifkin	Sean Scully. Twenty Years, 1976-1995	Hirshhorn Museum and Sculpture Garden, Washington DC	
1995	Bernd Klüser and Sean Scully	Sean Scully. The Beauty of the Real	Gallerie Bernd Klüser, Munich	
1996	Hans-Michael Herzog	Sean Scully. “Catherine Paintings” aquarelles	Casino Luxembourg, Luxembourg	
1996	Victoria Combalia and Engrique Juncosa	Sean Scully	Galleria Carles Taché, Barcelona	
1996	Demetrio Paparoni, Sean Scully	Sean Scully. Obra Gràfica Recent	Galeria D’art, Barcelona	
1996	Danilo Eccher, David Carrier, Hans-Michael Herzog	Sean Scully	Galleria d'Arte Moderna, Milan/Charta, Bologna/Milan:	
1996	Jean-Louis Schefer, Xavier Girard, Arthur Danto	Sean Scully	Galerie nationale du Jeu de Paume, Paris	
1996	Ned Rifkin, Victoria Combalia, Lynne Cooke, Armin Zweite	Sean Scully. Vintanys, 1976-1995	Fundació la Caixa, Barcelona	
1996	Ned Rifkin, Victoria Combalia, Lynne Cooke, Armin Zweite	Sean Scully. ZwanzigJahre, 1976-1995	Schirn Kunsthalle, Frankfurt	
1996	Michael Semff, Arthur Danto, and Mario-Andreas von Lüttichau	Sean Scully. Works on Paper	Staatliche Graphische Sammlung München, Munich	
1997	Mark Glazebrook and Irving Sandler	Sean Scully. Paintings	Manchester Art Gallery, Manchester	
1997	Armin Zweite	Sean Scully	Galeria DV, San Sebastian	
1997	Francisco Jarauta, Kevin Power, Jean-Louis Schefer	Sean Scully	Sala de Exposiciones REKALDE, Bilbao	
1997	Jean Frémon	Sean Scully	Galerie Lelong, Paris	
1998	Francisco Jarauta	Sean Scully	Galería Antonia Puyó, Zaragoza	
1998	Jean Frémon	Échiquier du rêve	L’Échoppe, Paris	
1998	Jérôme Sans	Lawrence Carroll and Sean Scully.	Lawing Gallery, Houston	
1998		Sean Scully	Galerie Bernd Klüser, Munich	
1998	Helmut Friedel, Hans-Michael Herzog	Sean Scully	BAWAG, Vienna	
1998		Sean Scully	Galerie Haas and Fuchs, Berlin	
1999	Edward Lucie-Smith, Hans-Michael Herzog	Sean Scully	South London Gallery, London	
1999	John Yau	Sean Scully	Galerie Lelong, Paris	
1999	John Yau, Hans-Michael Herzog	Sean Scully. New Paintings and Works on Paper	Danese/Galerie Lelong, New York	
1999	Sean Scully, Federico García Lorca, Bernd Klüser	Sean Scully. Barcelona Paintings and Recent Editions	Galerie Bernd Klüser, Munich	
1999	Kevin Power	Sean Scully	Kerlin Gallery, Dublin	
1999	Victoria Martino, Julia Klüser	Sean Scully. Prints: Catalogue Raisonné 1968-1999	Galerie Lelong/Galerie Bernd Klüser, Munich	
2000	Francisco Jarauta	Sean Scully	Galeria Carles Taché, Barcelona	
2000	Julia Klüser	Sean Scully. Estampes 1983-1999	Musée des Beaux-Arts de Caen, Caen	
2001	Sean Scully	Sean Scully. Cuaderno de Artista	Matador, Madrid	
2001	Daniel Abadie	Sean Scully. Light to Dark	Galerie Lelong, Paris	
2001	Armin Zweite, Bernd Klüser, Francisco Jaraunta, Hans-Michael Herzog, Maria Müller	Sean Scully. Paintings Pastels Watercolors Photographs 1990-2000	Kunstsammlung Nordrhein-Westfalen, Düsseldorf	
2001	Karin Hennig	Sean Scully	Künstler, München	
2001	Arthur Danto	Sean Scully. Light and Gravity	Knoedler and Company, New York	
2001	Sean Scully	Coming and Going: A Kata	Film Study Center, Harvard University, Cambridge	
2001	Michael Auping	Sean Scully. Wall of Light/Muro de Luz	Museo de Arte Contemporáneo de Monterrey	
2002	Armin Zweite	Sean Scully: Óleos Pasteles Acuarelas Fotografías	Institut Valencià d'Art Modern, Valencia:	
2002	Ronaldo Brito	Sean Scully. Wall of Light	Centro de Arte Hélio Oiticica, Rio de Janeiro	
2002	Fernando Francés	Sean Scully	Cámera De Comercio De Cantabria, Santander	
2002	Ulrich Bischoff	Sean Scully zu Gast in der Galerie Neue Meister	Galerie Neue Mesiter, Dresden	
2003	Maria Lluïsa Borràs i Gonzàlez	Sean Scully	Galeria Carles Taché, Barcelona	
2003	Kevin Power	Sean Scully: Wall of Light, Figures	Timothy Taylor Gallery, London	
2003	Gilles Altieri, Pierre Wat, Francisco Jarauta, Hans-Michael Herzog	Sean Scully	Hôtel des Arts, Toulon	
2003	Timo Vuorikoski, Donald Kuspit, Jürgen Habermas	Sean Scully	Sara Hildén Art Husem, Tampere	
2004	Michael Peppiatt	Sean Scully. Winter Robe	Galerie Lelong, Paris	
2004	Florian Steinberg, Wilhelm Christoph Warning	Sean Scully and John Groom	Galerie 422, Gmunden	
2004	M. J. Balsach	Sean Scully. Dedicado a Federico García Lorca	Casa, Museo Federico García Lorca, Granada	
2004	Brian Kennedy, Jörg Hutter, Timo Vuorikoski, Arthur Danto, Jürgen Habermas, Donald Kuspit, Liliane Tomasko, Shaune A. Lakin	Sean Scully. Body of Light	National Gallery of Australia, Canberra	
2004	Enrique Juncosa, Jürgen Habermas, Kevin Power	Tigresen el jardín/Tigers in the garden	Centro José Guerrero, Granada	
2005	Sean Scully	Sean Scully	Ingleby Gallery, Edinburgh	
2005	William Feaver	Sean Scully. Paintings and Works on Paper	Abbot Hall Art Gallery/Lakeland Arts, Kendal	
2005	Stephen Bennett Phillips, Michael Auping, Anne L. Strauss	Sean Scully. Wall of Light	The Phillips Collection, Rizzoli/Washington DC/New York	
2005	Victoria Combalia, Lowery Stokes Sims	Sean Scully. Para García Lorca	Sala de Exposiciones Acala 31, Madrid	
2005	Marianne Heinz, Liliane Tomasko	Sean Scully. Malerie: kleine Formate	Staatliche Museen, Kassel	
2005	Mia Fineman	Sean Scully. Fotografías	Galeria Carles Taché, Barcelona	
2006	John Yau	Sean Scully. Recent Paintings	L.A. Louver, Venice	
2006	Uwe Wieczorek	Sean Scully. Die Architektur der Farbe/The Architecture of Color	Kunstmuseum Liechtenstein, Vaduz	
2006	Sue Hubbard	Sean Scully	Timothy Taylor Gallery, London	
2007	Danilo Eccher, Lorand Hegyi, Maria Lluïsa Borràs i Gonzàlez, Donald Kuspit	Sean Scully: A retrospective	Fundació Joan Miró, Barcelona/Thames and Hudson, London	
2008	Sue Hubbard	Sean Scully. La surface peinte	Galerie Lelong, Paris	
2008	Brian Kennedy	Sean Scully. The Art of the Stripe	Hood Museum of Art, Dartmouth College, Hanover	
2008	Sean Scully, Brian Kennedy	Sean Scully. The Art of the Stripe. Exhibition Guide	Hood Museum of Art, Dartmouth College, Hanover	
2008		Looking at Sean Scully's Paintings.	Hood Museum of Art, Dartmouth College, Hanover	
2009	Susanne Kleine, Walter Smerling	Sean Scully. Konstantinopleoder Die versteckteSinnlichkeit. Die Bilderwelt von Sean Scully	Museum Küppersmühle, Munich	
2009	Paul Köser	Sean Scully	Museum Küppersmühle, Duisburg	
2009	László Hegyeshalmi, Walter Storms, Helmut Friedel	Sean Scully. Emotion and Structure	House of Fine Arts/Modern Gallery- László Vass Collection/Walter Storms Gallery, Veszprém/Munich	
2009	Tiffany Bell	Sean Scully	Edizioni Charta, Milan	
2009	Hans-Michael Herzog, Mauricio Sotelo, Sean Scully, Florian Steininger	Sean Scully	Galerie Carles Taché, S. L., Barcelona	
2010	Tanja Pirsig-Marshall, Arthur C. Danto and Armin Zweite	Sean Scully Works from the 1980s	VISUAL Centre for Contemporary Art and the George Bernard Shaw Theater, Carlow/Leeds Art Gallery	
2010	Richard Ingleby	Sean Scully Iona	Ingleby Gallery, Edinburgh	
2010	David Cohen	Sean Scully	Timothy Taylor Gallery, London	
2010	Hans Albrecht Lusznat, Björn Kurt	Sean Scully: Art Comes from Need	Sisyphos Film München, München:	DVD/90 min.
2011	Reinhard Spieler, Tanja Pirsig-Marshall, Arthur Danto, Armin Zweite	Sean Scully Werkeaus den 1980er Jahren	Wilhelm-Hack-Museum, Ludwigshafen	
2011	Lenore D. Miller, Stephen Bennett Phillips	Sean Scully: Works on Paper	Luther W. Brady Art Gallery, George Washington University, Washington DC	
2011	Kelly Grovier	Sean Scully: Paintings and Watercolors.	Chazen Museum of Art, Madison	
2011	Sean Scully, Kelly Grovier	Tin Mal/Cut Ground	Kerlin Gallery, Dublin	
2012	Joanna Kleinberg, Brett Littman	Sean Scully: Change and Horizontals	Drawing Center, New York	
2012	Matthais Frehner, Annick Haldemann, Brigitte Reutner	Sean Scully. Grey Wolf-Retrospektive	Museum of Fine Arts, Bern	
2012	Oscar Humphries, Kelly Grovier, Ben Luke, and Sean Scully	Sean Scully: Doric	Oliver Wood, London	
2012	Kosme de Barañano, Kelly Grovier	Sean Scully: Light of the South	TF Editores, Madrid	
2012	Lóránd Hegyi, Eunmi Lee	Sean Scully: The Evocative Capacity of Painting	Wooson Gallery, Daegu	
2013		Sean Scully	The Verey Gallery, Eton College, Windsor	
2013	Andrea Leventis	Sean Scully: Works from the 70s	Timothy Taylor Gallery, London	
2013	Joanna Kleinberg, Brett Littman, Colm Tóibín, Peter Benson Miller, Maria Giuseppina Di Monte	Change and Horizontals	Galleria Nazionale d'Arte Moderna, Rome	
2013	Sean Scully, Gregory Perry, Simon Martin	Triptychs. Sean Scully	Pallant House Gallery, Chichester	
2013	John Yau	Sean Scully. Night and Day	Cheim & Read	
2014	Jean Frémon, Kelly Grovier, Christos Paridis	Sean Scully. Doric	Galerie Lelong, Paris	
2014	Christopher Lewis, Kelly Grovier, Jacqueline Thalmann	Sean Scully Encounters: A New Master among Old Masters	Christ Church Picture Gallery, Oxford	
2014	Kelly Grovier, Richard Williams	Sean Scully: Kind of Red	Timothy Taylor Gallery, London	
2014	Sean Scully, Beate Reifenscheid, Marc O’Sullivan	Sean Scully. Figure/Abstract	Ludwig Museum, Berlin	
2014	Sean Scully, Philip Dodd, Ding Yi, Wang Huangsheng, Arthur Danto, Jürgen Habermas, John Yau	Follow the Heart. The Art of Sean Scully: 1964-2014	Shanghai Himalayas Museum/CAFA Art Museum, Beijing	
2014	Sean Scully	Sean Scully. China Piled Up. Sculpture Spec	Timothy Taylor Gallery, London	
2015	Jacopa Crivelli Viscont, Philip Dodd, Sean Scully	Sean Scully: 1974-2015	Pinacoteca do Estado de São Paulo, São Paulo	
2015	Sean Scully, Danilo Eccher, Kelly Grovier, Ben Luke, Hans-Ulrich Obrist	Sean Scully Land Sea	Venice Biennale, Italy	
2015	Declan Long	Sean Scully: HOME	Kerlin Gallery, Dublin	
2015	Sean Rainbird, Kelly Grovier, Lochlann Quinn	Sean Scully	National Gallery of Ireland, Dublin	
2015	Kelly Grovier, Bono, Reinhard Spieler, Sean Scully	Sean Scully: Bricklayer of the Soul	Hatje Cantz Verlag, Germany	
2015	Peter Baum	Sean Scully. MalereialsWeltaneignung	Museum Liauning, Neuhaus, Austria	
2015	Kelly Grovier	Sean Scully Different Places	Château La Coste, Kerlin Gallery, Dublin	
2016	Sean Scully, Philip Dodd	Sean Scully: Resistance and Persistence- Paintings 1967-2015 London and New York	Nanjing University of the Arts/Guangdong Museum of Art/Hubei Museum of Art	
2016	Javier Molins	Scully and Tomasko	Fundación Bancaja, Spain	
2016	Robert Mnuchin, Sukanya Rajaratnam, Michael McGinniss, Deborah Solomon	Sean Scully. The Eighties	Mnuchin Gallery, New York	
2016	Daniel Abaide	Sean Scully. Metal	Galerie Lelong, Paris	
2016	Timothy Taylor	Sean Scully. Horizon	Musumeci S. p. A., Italy	
2017	Sean Scully, Liliane Tomasko, Florian Steininger, Valeria Waibel	beide|both: Sean Scully and Liliane Tomasko.	Kustwerk Sammlung Klein, Germany	
2017	John Cheim, Pac Pobric, Elle Robinson	Sean Scully	Cheim & Read	
2017	Josep M Soler, Mercè Conesa, Francesc Xavier Altés I Aguiló, Eduard Sánchez, Xavier Guitart Tarrés, Albert Mercadé, Daniel Giralt-Miracle	Santa Cecília de Montserrat. Del Segle X A Sean Scully	Publicacions de l’Abadia de Montserrat, Barcelona	
2017	Kelly Grovier, Evgenia Petrova, Olga Sviblova	Sean Scully. Facing East	Russian Museum, St. Petersburg	
2018	Sean Scully, Kelly Grovier, Daniel Garza-Usabiaga, Oscar Humphries	Sean Scully, San Cristóbal	Oscar Humphries, San Cristóbal	
2018	Sukanya Rajaratnam	Sean Scully. Wall of Light	Mnuchin Gallery, New York	
2018	Sean Scully, Frances Spalding, Edward Lucie-Smith, William Feaver, Robert C. Morgan	Sean Scully. 1970	Laing Art Gallery and Hatton Gallery/Walker Art Gallery	
2018	Kirsten Claudia Voigt, Tanja Pirsig-Marshall	Sean Scully Vita Duplex	Staatliche Kunsthalle Karlsruhe/Museum für Kunst und Kultur, Münster	
2018	Alfredo Cramerotti, Sean Scully	Standing on the Edge of the World: Sean Scully	Hong Kong Arts Centre, Hong Kong	
2018	Sinéad Morrissey	Crossings: Poets respond to the Art of Sean Scully	Newcastle Centre for the Literary Arts, Newcastle University	
2018	Rudi Fuchs, Kelly Grovier, Declan Long	Sean Scully: Landlines and other recent works,	De Pont Museum of Contemporary Art,	
2018	Melissa Chiu, Patricia Hickson, Kelly Grovier, Stéphane Aquin	Sean Scully: Landline	Hirshhorn Museum and Sculpture Garden, Smithsonian Books	
2018	Harry Blain, Alexander Borovsky, Ben Luke	Sean Scully: Uninsideout	Blain Southern, London	
2018	Marla Price	Sean Scully: Catalogue Raisonée of the Paintings, Volume II, 1980-1989	Modern Art Museum of Fort Worth in association with Hatje Cantz	
2019	Justus Kewenig, Jon Wood, Kirsten Voigt, Sean Scully, Clare Lilley, Peter Murray	Sean Scully. Sculpture	HatjeCantz	
2019	Carmelo Grasso, Norberto Villa, Kelly Grovier, Javier Molins	Sean Scully. Human	Abazzia di San Giorgio Maggiore, Skira	
2019	Klaus Albrecht Schröder, Werner Spies, Sean Scully, Elizabeth Dutz, Kelly Grovier	Sean Scully: Eleuthera	Albertina/Kerber Art Verlag	
2019	Anna Bernardini, Kelly Grovier, Marta Spanevello	Sean Scully: Long Light	FAI Villa Panza, Magonza	
2019	Daniel F. Herrmann, Colin Higgins	Sean Scully at the National Gallery: Sea Star	National Gallery Company, London	
2019	Alcalde de Malaga, Helena Juncosa, Sean Scully, Werner Spies	Sean Scully: Eleuthera	Centro de Arte Contemporaneo de Malaga	

== Quotes ==
- “Art, especially abstraction: has to be a moral act. If not it’s likely to fall into bed with decoration.”
- “Why stripes? Because they can be anything. And they can be anything because they are nothing. To make nothing into something is more interesting that making something into something else. The association with the devil notwithstanding”
- “Artistic culture, to me, is like a huge rug that is constantly folded and unfolded by us. Every time it’s turned over, turned out, unfolded: it shows something new or something overlooked that now seems new.”

== Sources ==
- Dorothy Walker (2002). Scully, Seán in Brian Lalor (Ed.), The Encyclopedia of Ireland. Dublin: Gill and Macmillan. ISBN 0-7171-3000-2.
- Arthur C. Danto (2007). "Architectural Principles in the Art of Sean Scully", Border Crossings: A Magazine of the Arts, vol. 26(3), August 2007, p. 62–67. ISSN 0831-2559.
- Arthur C. Danto. (2005). "Sean Scully". Unnatural Wonders: Essays from the Gap Between Art and Life. NY: Columbia University Press. p. 81. ISBN 9780231545723.
- Joan Marter (2011). "Sean Scully". Grove Encyclopedia of American Art. Oxford University Press. ISBN 978-0-19-533579-8.
- David Carrier (1994). The Aesthete in the City: The Philosophy and Practice of American Abstract Painting in the 1980s. Penn State Press. 1994. ISBN 978-0-271-04297-8.
- Donald Kuspit (2010). "Sacred Sadness: Sean Scully's Abstractions", Psychodrama: Modern Art as Group Therapy. London: Ziggurat. pp. 449–453. ISBN 9780956103895.
- David Carrier (2008). A World Art History and Its Objects. Penn State Press. 2008. ISBN 978-0-271-04579-5.
- Sean Scully (2016). Inner: The Collected Writings and Selected Interviews of Sean Scully. ISBN 3-7757-4164-X.
