= David Carrier =

American art historian

- Born: 1944 (age 81–82)

Education
- Education: Columbia University

Philosophical work
- Era: Contemporary philosophy
- Region: Western philosophy
- School: Analytic
- Main interests: Aesthetics, cultural criticism, comics theory
- Notable ideas: Analytic philosophy of comics

David Carrier (/ˈkæriər/; born 1944) is an American philosopher of art and cultural critic.

== Education ==
Carrier received a Ph.D. in philosophy from Columbia University, where he was a student of Arthur Danto, in 1972. He was a Getty Scholar (1999–2000), a Clark Fellow (2004), a Senior Fellow, National Humanities Center, 2006–2007 and holder of the Fulbright-Luce Lectureship, Spring 2009.

== Work ==
Carrier was the Champney Family Professor in the department of art and art history at Case Western Reserve University and was a professor of philosophy at Carnegie Mellon University. He is the author of Principles of Art History Writing (Penn State University Press, 1991), The Aesthete in the City: The Philosophy and Practice of American Abstract Painting in the 1980s (Penn State University Press, 1994), High Art: Charles Baudelaire and the Origins of Modernist Painting (Penn State University Press, 1996), A World Art History and Its Objects (Penn State University Press, 2009), The Aesthetics of Comics (Penn State University Press, 2000), and Museum Skepticism: A History of the Display of Art in Public Galleries (Duke University Press, 2006), and Wild Art with his partner Joachim Pissarro (Phaidon Press), among others. He is a contributor to Artforum, BOMB Magazine, and ArtUS.

He has written about the history and philosophy of art writing, raising questions about the relativism of art writing in different eras by comparing texts written about the same artwork and analyzing changing styles of interpretation.

== Books ==
- Truth and Falsity in Visual Images (with Mark Roskill) (University of Massachusetts Press, 1983)
- Artwriting (University of Massachusetts Press, 1987)
- Principles of Art History Writing (Penn State University Press, 1991)
- Poussin's Paintings: A Study in Art-Historical Methodology (Penn State University Press, 1993)
- The Aesthete in the City: The Philosophy and Practice of American Abstract Painting in the 1980s (Penn State University Press, 1994)
- Nicolas Poussin: Lettere sull'arte (Editor, with an introduction; Hestia edizione, 1995)
- High Art: Charles Baudelaire and the Origins of Modernism (Penn State University Press, 1996)
- England and Its Aesthetes: Biography and Taste (Routledge, 1998)
- Garner Tullis: The Life of Collaboration (Garner Tullis, 1998)
- The Aesthetics of Comics (Penn State University Press, 2000)
- Rosalind Krauss and American Philosophical Art Criticism: From Formalism to Beyond Postmodernism (Praeger, 2002)
- Writing about Visual Art (Aesthetics Today) (Allworth Press, 2003)
- Sean Scully (Thames & Hudson, 2004)
- Museum Skepticism: A History of the Display of Art in Public Galleries (Duke University Press, 2006)
- A World Art History and Its Objects (Penn State University Press, 2009)
- Proust/Warhol: Analytical Philosophy of Art (Peter Lang, 2009)
