= Garner Tullis =

American painter

- Born: December 12, 1939; Cincinnati, Ohio, U.S.
- Died: December 5, 2019 (aged 79); Urbino, Italy
- Education: Principia College, University of Pennsylvania, Stanford University
- Known for: Printmaking, sculpture, painting
- Awards: Fulbright Scholarship (1964); Fulbright Extension and Travel Grant; Ralph T. King Award for outstanding contributions to printmaking

Garner Handy Tullis (December 12, 1939 – December 5, 2019) was an American-born artist.

== Biography ==
Garner Tullis was born in Cincinnati, Ohio, the son of the industrialist and civic leader Richard Barclay Tullis (1913–1999) and his wife, the painter Chaillé Handy, daughter of Henry Jamison Handy. Both endowed the Chaillé H. and Richard B. Tullis Principal Viola Chair of the Cleveland Orchestra, currently occupied by Robert Vernon. Garner Tullis has two siblings, Sarah ("Sallie") and Barclay.

Tullis attended Principia College, and afterwards studied at the University of Pennsylvania (B.A. 1963; B.F.A. 1964), where he was taught by the architect Louis Kahn; the sculptor Jacques Lipchitz; and such legendary figures of the New York school as Emilio Vedova, Robert Motherwell, Barnett Newman, David Smith and Mark Rothko. Awarded an extended grant to Italy by the U.S.-Italy Fulbright Commission, he was able to travel throughout Europe before he studied at Stanford University under a Carnegie Fellowship (M.A. 1967). In 1972, he founded the International Institute of Experimental Printmaking, where he worked together with such notable artists as Richard Diebenkorn, Sam Francis, Helen Frankenthaler, Robert Mangold, Kenneth Noland, Dorothea Rockburne, Robert Ryman, Sean Scully, and William G. Tucker, as well as hundreds of other painters and sculptors, including many younger figures. His workshop in San Francisco was the first to work extensively with handmade paper.

Tullis taught at Bennington College, California State University, Stanislaus, University of California, Berkeley and Davis, as well as at Harvard University. Amongst others, his works belong to the collections of the Cleveland Museum of Art, the Museum of Modern Art in New York, the San Francisco Museum of Modern Art and of the Philadelphia Museum of Art.

Tullis has three sons and one daughter. His son Richard (b. 1962) also became a printmaker.

== Literature ==
- David Carrier: Garner Tullis and the Art of Collaboration; New York, NY, US, 1998. ISBN 0-9630990-1-9
