= Paolo Canevari =

Italian contemporary artist (born 1963)

Paolo Canevari (born 1963) is an Italian contemporary artist. Born in Rome, he lives and works in New York City. Canevari presents highly recognizable, commonplace symbols in order to comment on such concept as religion, the urban myths of happiness or the major principles behind creation and destruction.

== Career ==
Between 1989 and 1990 he lived in New York where he has his first solo show Rocce. In the 1990s he exhibited in numerous group shows in Los Angeles at the art gallery of Otis Parsons College of Art and Design, in Paris, in Kiev at the Soros Center for Contemporary Art, Vienna at the Vienna Secession, Frankfurt, in Dublin at the IMMA Irish Museum of Modern Art, Geneva, Taiwan, Liege as well as in Bologna, Rome, Milan, Prato, Naples, Spoleto, Venice.

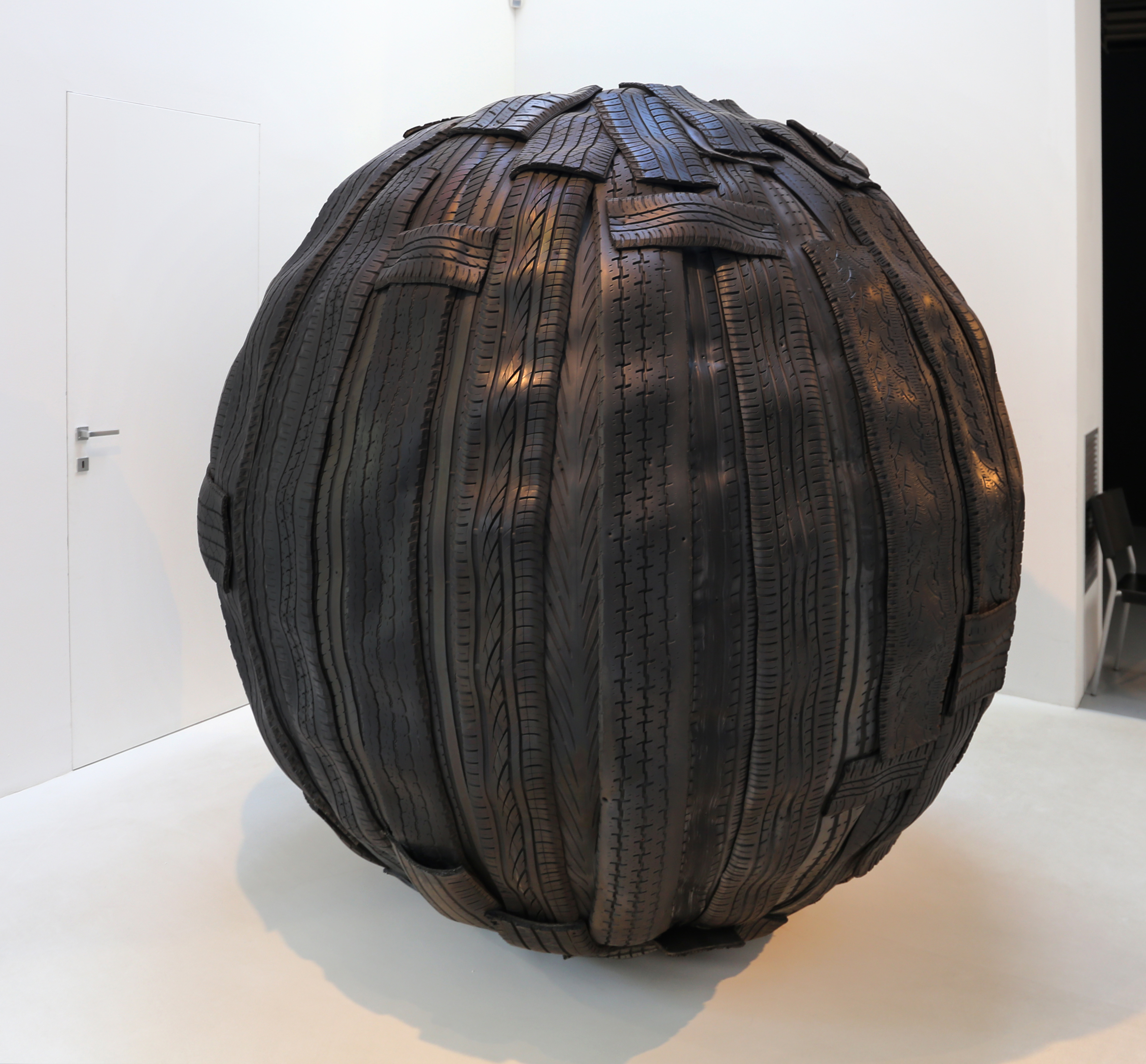
Nobody knows, 2010

In 1999 the participation in the XIII Quadriennale Palazzo delle Esposizioni Roma. In the next years his work is featured in numerous solo exhibitions. In 2000 in Rome at the Galleria Stefania Miscetti and in Bangkok Center for Academic Resources, Chulalongkorn University. In 2001 in Paris at the Galerie Cent8 and in Siena at the Palazzo delle Papesse Centro Arte Contemporanea. In Milan in the Galleria Christian Stein in 2002, 2005 and 2010. In 2002 the publisher Charta devoted a monograph with essays by Andrea Camilleri, Mario Codognato, Doris von Draten, Chrissie Iles and Valerio Magrelli to Canevari.

In 2004 the solo project "Welcome to Oz" at the Center for Contemporary Art PS1, New York curated by Alanna Heiss and the show “A Couple of Things I Have to Tell You” in the Sean Kelly Gallery, New York. In 2006 the solo project “Rubber Car” in the MART – Museo d’Arte contemporanea di Trento e Rovereto and the participation in “The Peace Tower Project” in the Whitney Biennial at the Whitney Museum of American Art. In 2007 the solo show “Nothing from Nothing” curated by Danilo Eccher at the MACRO, Museo d’Arte Contemporanea Roma, for the show a catalog is published by Electa with text by Danilo Eccher, Alanna Heiss, Klaus Biesenbach, Chrissie Iles. In 2007 Canevari participates at the 52nd Biennale Internazionale di Venezia curated by Robert Storr with the video "Bouncing Skull" which will become in 2008 part of the MoMA permanent collection in New York. Other solo exhibitions in 2008: “Decalogo” at the Calcografia Nazionale, Istituto per la Grafica Roma, MoMA New York “Raw-War” curated by Klaus Biesenbach.

In 2010 the solo show “Nobody Knows” curated by Germano Celant at the Centro per l’Arte Contemporanea Luigi Pecci, Prato, in occasion of the show Electa published a comprehensive monograph curated by Germano Celant. Also in 2010 the show “Odi et Amo” at the GNAM Galleria Nazionale d’Arte Moderna Rome. In 2011 the solo show “Decalogo” at The Drawing Center, New York.In 2014 Out of Left Field, 4th Quadrilateral Biennial, Museum of Modern and Contemporary Art, Rijeka, Croatia. In 2015 Arts&Foods. Rituals since 1851, curated by Germano Celant. Triennale Milano. In 2016 he took part in the show Challenging Beauty– Insights of Italian Contemporary Art, Curated by Lorand Hegyi at the Parkview Green Contemporary Art Museum, Pechino, China. In 2018 the participation in the first Bangkok Biennale with the installation: "Monuments of the Memory, the Golden Room" and in November of the same year his drawings from the nineties series "Memoria Mia" accompany the short story book "I tacchini non thank "by Andrea Camilleri. In 2019 the retrospective of nine main cycles of works from 1990 to 2020 at the Christian Stein gallery in Milan. In 2020 the personal exhibition "Dark Matter" in the Gallery of Modern Art "G. Carandente" Palazzo Collicola Spoleto curated by Marco Tonelli and Lorenzo Fiorucci. In 2021 the solo show: “Self-portrait/Autoritratto”, Cardi Gallery, London. The solo show “Good-Year” in 2024 inside the evocative Umbrian archaeological area Carsulae, curated by Costantino D’Orazio. In 2025, solo exhibitions will be held at the Stein Gallery in Milan and “God Year” at the Pinacoteca Comunale, Palazzo Vitelli alla Cannoniera in Città di Castello, curated by Lorenzo Fiorucci.

His works are present in private and public collections including:

Luigi Pecci Center for Contemporary Art, Prato; Museum of Modern Art MoMA, New York; Louis Vuitton pour la Creation, Paris; Cisneros Fontanals Art Foundation, Miami; Macro, Museum of Contemporary Art of Rome; MART Museum of Contemporary Art of Trento and Rovereto; Johannesburg Art Gallery, Johannesburg; National Institute for Graphics National Chalcography, Rome; GNAM National Gallery of Modern Art, Rome; Perna Foundation, Capri, Olnick Spanu Art Program Garrison NY. MAXXI, National Museum of XXI Century Arts, Rome, "G. Carandente" Modern Art Gallery Palazzo Collicola Spoleto.

In April 2006, after a ten-year relationship, he married Serbian artist Marina Abramović; they divorced in 2009.

== Exhibitions ==
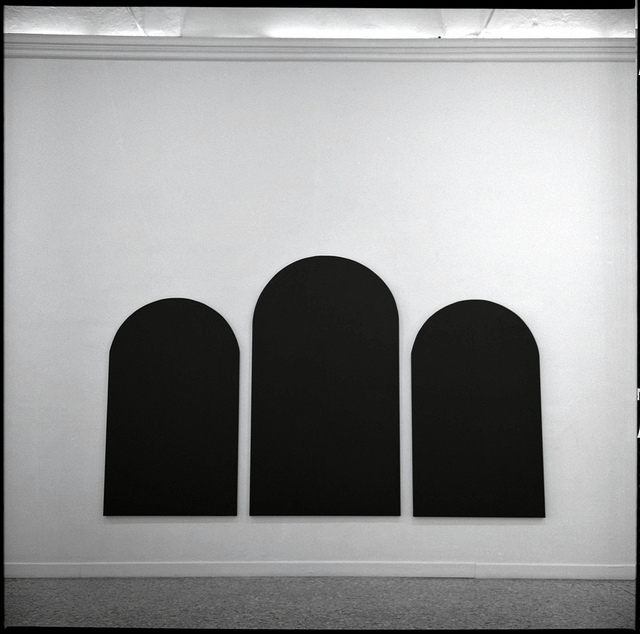
"Monuments of the Memory" (2013) - Galleria Christian Stein Milano, June–July 2013

Canevari has presented his work at major institution worldwide, including:

- the XIII Esposizione la Quadriennale d’Arte - Rome in 2000
- Palazzo delle Papesse - Siena in 2001
- the Center for academic Resources - Chulalongkorn University - Bangkok in 2001
- the Liverpool Biennial in 2004
- the Johannesburg Art Gallery - Contemporary Art Museum - Johannesburgin 2005
- the Kunst-Werke Institute for Contemporary Art - Berlin in 2006
- P.S.1 Center for Contemporary Art - New York in 2004/2007
- the MART Museo d’Arte Moderna e Contemporanea - Rovereto in 2005
- the Macro, Museo d’Arte Contemporanea - Rome in 2007
- the 52ma Esposizione Internazionale d’Arte la Biennale di Venezia, Venice in 2007
- the Istituto Nazionale per la Grafica, Rome in 2008
- the MoMA New York in 2008, (his video Bouncing Skull is part of the permanent collection).
- In 2010 Germano Celant curated a mid carrier retrospective at Centro per l'Arte Contemporanea Luigi Pecci, Prato, also in 2010 his solo show at the Galleria Nazionale d’Arte Moderna e contemporanea di Roma.
