= Daniel Lelong =

French gallerist and publisher (1933–2025)

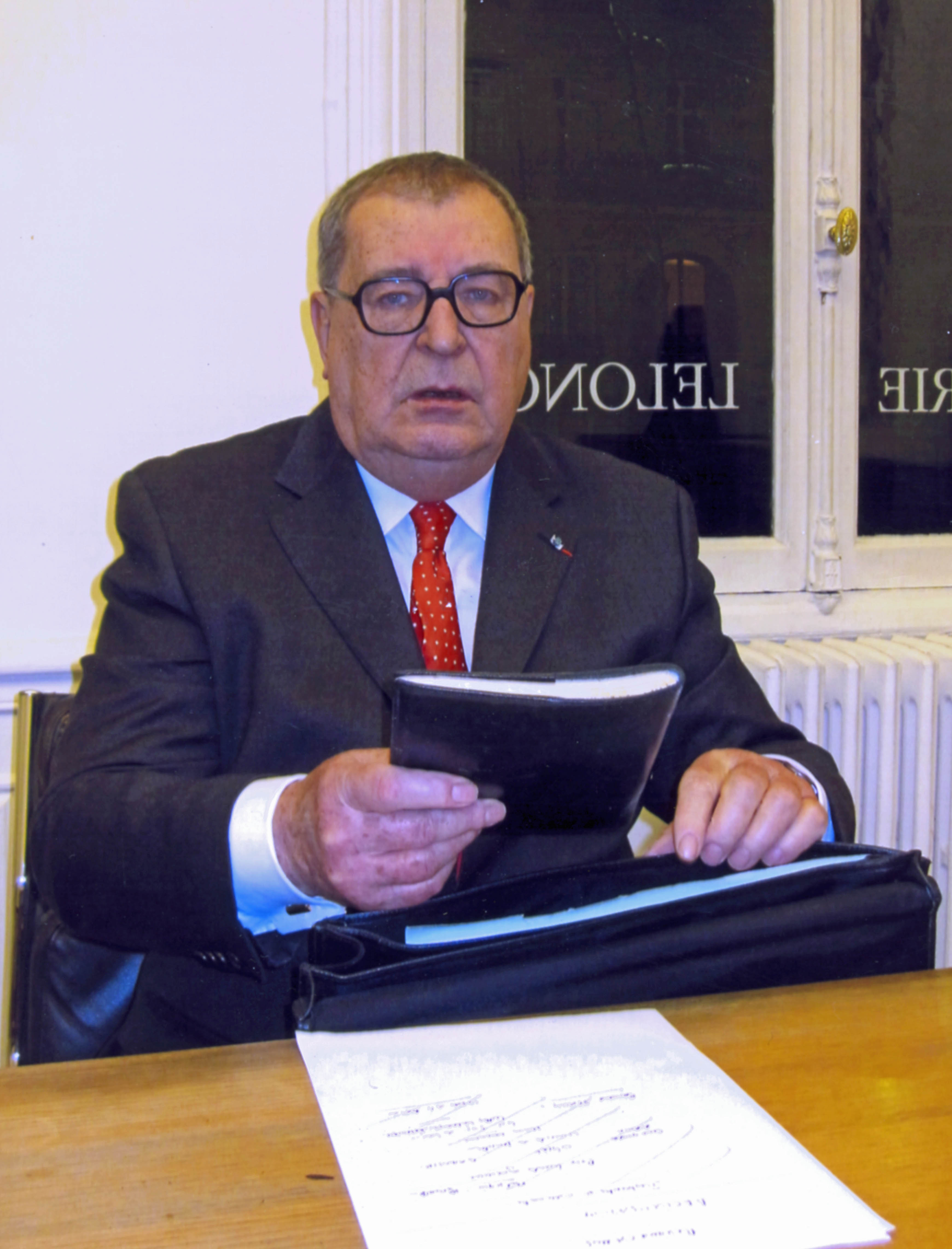
- Lelong in 2012
- Born: 9 November 1933; Nancy, France
- Died: 4 June 2025 (aged 91)
- Education: Sciences Po
- Occupation(s): Gallerist, publisher

Daniel Lelong (9 November 1933 – 4 June 2025) was a French gallerist of modern art and book publisher. He served as president of the Galerie Maeght and the Galerie Lelong until 2012, when he was succeeded by Jean Frémon.

== Life and career ==
Born in Nancy in 1933, Lelong was the son of a government official. He studied at the Collège-lycée Jacques-Decour in Paris and the Sciences Po. After his studies, he worked for the Conseil d'État, becoming acquainted with several French political figures, such as Pierre Mendès France.

During the Algerian War, Lelong was the secretary to the wife of General Jacques Massol. In 1960, he returned to Paris, where he met Aimé Maeght. The two worked together on the construction of the Fondation Maeght in Saint-Paul-de-Vence. He then left the civil service for good to direct the Galerie Maeght, located in Paris. The gallery hosted artists such as Joan Miró, Alexander Calder, Antoni Tàpies, Paul Rebeyrolle, and Francis Bacon. After Maeght's death, he co-directed the gallery alongside Jean Frémon and Jacques Dupin. In 1987, he attempted to rename it to the Galerie Lelong, but lost a legal battle against Maeght's son, forcing him to return the gallery to its original name. Under his leadership, the gallery would go on to host artists such as Pierre Alechinsky, Louise Bourgeois, Sarah Grilo, Jannis Kounellis, Sean Scully, Kiki Smith, and Jaume Plensa. In 1980, he worked alongside artists to create the official poster for the French Open. In 1982, he chose the artists to design the poster for the World Cup. In the 2000s, the contemporary art market was booming, growing the gallery's sales rapidly. In 2018, he opened a new second gallery on the Avenue Montaigne in Paris.

Lelong died on 4 June 2025, at the age of 91.

== Distinctions ==
- Knight of the Legion of Honour
- Commander of the Ordre des Arts et des Lettres (2010)

== Books ==
- Calder, the Artist, the Work (1971)
- Adami : 89 (1989)
- Avec Calder (2000)
- Avec Miro (2013)
