= Philip Dodd =

Philip Dodd may refer to:

- Philip Dodd (author) (born 1957), author, editor and publishing consultant
- Philip Dodd (broadcaster) (born 1949), broadcaster, writer and editor
- Philip Stanhope Dodd (1775–1852), Church of England clergyman
- Philip Dodd (actor), Australian actor

== See also ==
- Phil Dodds (1951–2007), audio engineer
