= Jean Frémon =

- Born: 1946 (age 79–80); Paris, France
- Citizenship: French
- Occupations: Poet, galerist
- Writing career
- Genres: poetry, essay, art criticism

Jean Frémon (born 1946 in Paris) is a French gallerist and writer. His written work spans and fuses genres, and contributed importantly to a trans-genre tendency in contemporary French letters. Working principally in the modes of ekphrasis, art criticism, literary commentary, narrative, and poetry, Frémon is perhaps unique in his fusion of late 20th century experimentalism with the deeply rooted French tradition of belles lettres.

After taking a degree in law, Frémon joined the Galerie Maeght, well known for representing important early and mid-20th century artists such as Joan Miró, Marc Chagall, Henri Matisse, and Alexander Calder. After the death of its founder, Aimé Maeght, in 1981, Frémon, along with Daniel Lelong and Jacques Dupin, founded the Galerie Lelong, which continued and extended the work of the Galerie Maeght in its same location at 13 rue de Téhéran in the 8th arrondissement in Paris.

Galerie Lelong, of which Frémon is now the president, also has a branch in the Chelsea district of New York and participates in all the principal annual international art fairs including Art Basel, Art Basel Miami, and FIAC Paris. Artists shown by the gallery include Etel Adnan, Pierre Alechinsky, Francis Bacon, Louise Bourgeois, Nicola De Maria, Jan Dibbets, Günther Förg, Andy Goldsworthy, David Hockney, Donald Judd, Konrad Klapheck, Jannis Kounellis, Wolfgang Laib, Nalini Malani, Ana Mendieta, David Nash, Jaume Plensa, Arnulf Rainer, Robert Ryman, Antonio Saura, Sean Scully, Richard Serra, Kiki Smith, Nancy Spero, Antoni Tàpies, Barthélémy Toguo, and Juan Uslé.

== The Work ==
Early in his writing career, Frémon became associated with the experimental developments represented by the independent publisher Paul Otchakovsky-Laurens and his publishing house, P.O.L, which still publishes much of his work. Frémon has also published with presses dedicated to artists books and artist-writer collaborations, such as Fata Morgana and L’Échoppe, and larger literary houses including Gallimard, Flammarion, and Éditions du Seuil. His writings span a variety of genres, including poetry, novels, and creative non-fiction.

He has also developed a hybrid genre of art-historical fictional essays, in which he takes artists from the Renaissance to the present as characters and through them explores artists, artworks, and their social and political contexts. He has done book-length works in this vein on Robert Ryman, Louise Bourgeois, and Antoni Tàpies, as well as countless shorter works collected in his volumes La Vraie nature des ombres, Gloire des formes, and Rue du Regard. He has also addressed the work of other writers, such as Marcel Proust, Robert Walser, Samuel Beckett, and Michel Leiris in homages stretched by imagination. Since 1969, he has published over twenty volumes as well as many catalogue articles and critical essays on contemporary artists.

His work has been translated into English, Spanish, and German, and he has translated two books by David Sylvester, one on Alberto Giacometti and one on Francis Bacon, both published by André Dimanche.

== Bibliography ==
- Le Miroir, les alouettes, Éditions du Seuil, 1969
- L’Origine des légendes, Éditions du Seuil, 1972
- Discours de la fatigue, Fata Morgana, 1972
- Ce qui n'a pas de visage, Flammarion, 1976
- Le Double jeu du tu, Fata Morgana, 1977, with Bernard Noël
- L’Envers, Maeght, 1978
- L’Exhibitionisme et sa pudeur, Fata Morgana, 1980
- Echéance, Flammarion, 1983
- Degottex, Éditions du Regard, 1989
- Le Jardin Botanique, P.O.L, 1988
- Le Singe mendiant, P.O.L, 1991
- Proustiennes, Fata Morgana, 1991
- Robert Ryman, le paradoxe absolu, L’Échoppe, 1991
- Antoni Tàpies, la substance et les accidents, Éditions Unes, 1991
- L’Ile des morts, P.O.L, 1994
- La Vraie nature des ombres, P.O.L, 2000
- Nicola De Maria, L’Échoppe, 2000
- Gloire des formes, P.O.L, 2005
- Louise Bourgeois Femme Maison, L’Échoppe, 2008
- Samuel Beckett dans ses petits souliers, L’Échoppe, 2009
- Louise Bourgeois: Moi, Eugénie Grandet, Gallimard, 2010
- Naissance (avec Louise Bourgeois), Fata Morgana, 2010
- Michel Leiris face à lui-même, L’Échoppe, 2011
- Rue du Regard, P.O.L, 2012
- La vie posthume de RW, Fata Morgana, 2012
- Calme toi, Louison, P.O.L.,2016
- L'Effet Wittgenstein, Fata Morgana, 2016
- David Hockney à l'atelier, L'Echoppe, 2017
- Paradoxes de Robert Ryman, L'Echoppe, 2018
- Les élus et les damnés, Fata Morgana, 2019
- Kounellis, homme ancien, artiste moderne, L'Echoppe, 2019
- Le Miroir magique, POL, 2020
- David Hockney en Pays d'Auge, L'Echoppe, 2020
- L'Eloquence de la ligne, entretien avec Saul Steinberg, L'Echoppe, 2021
- La Blancheur de la baleine, POL, 2023
- Probité de l'image, L'Atelier contemporain, 2024

In English translation:

- Painting, Black Square Editions, 1999, trans. Brian Evenson
- Island of the Dead, Green Integer Books, 2003 trans. Cole Swensen
- Distant Noise, Avec Books, 2003, trans. N. Cole, L. Davis, S. Gavronsky, C. Swensen
- The Paradoxes of Robert Ryman, Black Square Editions, 2008, trans. Brian Evenson
- The Real Life of Shadows, Post Apollo Press, 2009, trans. Cole Swensen
- The Botanical Garden, Green Integer Books, 2012, trans. Brian Evenson
- The Posthumous Life of RW, Omnidawn, 2014, trans. Cole Swensen
- Proustiennes, La Presse, 2016, trans. Brian Evenson
- Now Now, Louison, Les Fugitives, 2018, New Directions, 2019 trans. Cole Swensen
- Nativity, Les Fugitives, 2020;Black Square Editions, 2020, trans Cole Swensen
- Portrait Tales, Les Fugitives, 2023, trans. John Taylor
- Goddess of the void, Hermits United, 2025, Trans. Georges Hume
- David Hockney in his studio, Hermits United, 2025, Trans. Jacob Bromberg
- David Hockney in Pays d'Auge, Hermits United, 2025, Trans. Georges Hume

In Spanish translation:

- El Jardin botanico, Espasa-Calpe, 1990, trans. Encarna Castejon
- La Isla de los muertos, Alianza, 1994, trans. Encarna Castejon
- Louise Bourgeois Mujer Casa, Elba, 2008, trans. Milena Busquets
- Calle de la Mirada, Elba, 2016, trans. Ignacio Vidal-Folch
- David Hockney "Love life", Elba, 2017, trans. Ignacio Vidal-Folch
- Vamos, Louison, Elba, 2019, trans. Ignacio Vidal-Folch
- El Espejo magico, Elba, 2022, trans.Jose Ramon Monreal
- Antoni Tàpies, La sustancia y los accidentes, Elba, 2026, trans. Guillem Usandizaga

In German translation:

- Die Kehrseite, edition M,1982
- Gleichung, Edition M,1988
- Loslassen, TM Verlag,1989
- Wellen, edition M,1991, trans Friedhelm Kemp
- Eklipsen, TM Verlag,1992
- Louise Bourgeois: Moi Eugénie Grandet, Piet Meyer Verlag, 2012, trans. Cordula Unewiese
- RW's Nachleben, Lettre International,2019, trans. Martin Zingg
- Geburt, Lettre International 139, 2022, trans. Martin Zingg

In Norwegian

- Seremoni, Vinduet, Gyldendal norsk Verlag, trans Jorn Svaeren
- Fodsel, Flamme forlag, 2013, trans. Rune Skoe
