= East Coast Light I =

Painting by Sean Scully

- Artist: Sean Scully
- Year: 1973
- Medium: oil on canvas
- Dimensions: 216 cm × 254 cm (85 in × 100 in)
- Location: Crawford Gallery, Cork

East Coast Light I is an abstract painting by Irish-born American artist Sean Scully, from 1973.

== Description ==
The painting is an oil on canvas with dimensions of 216 x 254 centimeters. It is in the collection of the Crawford Gallery, in Cork.

== Analysis ==
It is an early work, exhibited in 1973 in Cork. It is a hard-edged abstraction style painting.
