= Kelly Grovier =

American poet, historian, and art critic

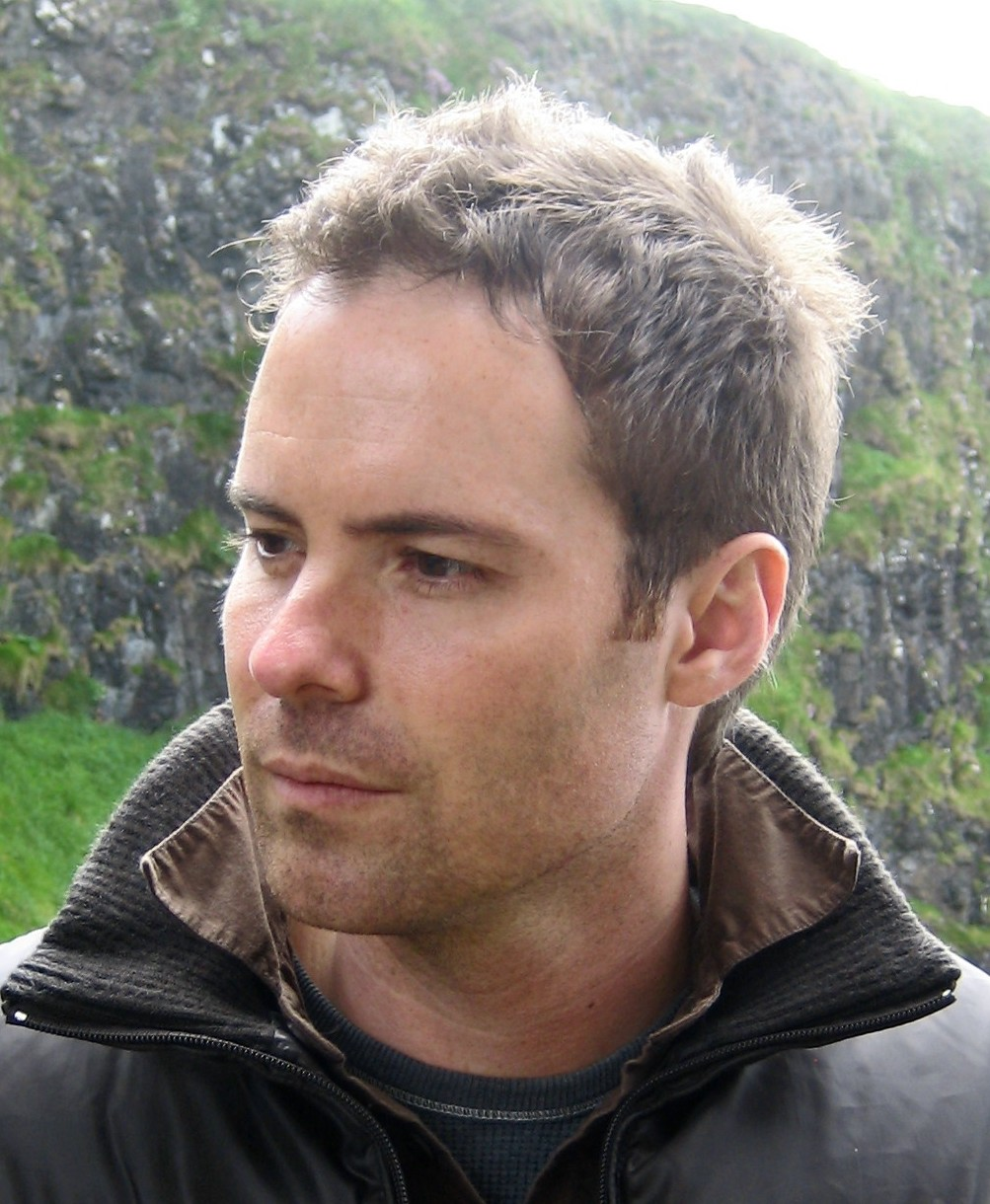
Kelly Grovier

Kelly Grovier is an American poet, historian, and art critic. Author of a dozen books, he is a regular contributor on art and literature to the Times Literary Supplement and co-founder of the scholarly journal European Romantic Review.

== Early life and education ==
Born in Grand Rapids, Michigan in 1968, Grovier was educated at the University of California, Los Angeles, where he received the school's Outstanding Senior of the Year Award upon graduation, and at Oxford University, where he was a Marshall Scholar. He received his doctorate from Oxford in 2005 after writing a thesis on the eighteenth-century adventurer and philosopher, John "Walking" Stewart (1747–1822).

== Writing ==
Grovier is the author of three collections of poetry, A Lens in the Palm (2008), The Sleepwalker at Sea (2011), and The Lantern Cage (2014), all published by Carcanet Press. On 19 September 2008, Grovier recorded a reading of his poems for the historic online Poetry Archive. His poems frequently appear in literary journals, including Poetry Review, P. N. Review, Poetry London, New Welsh Review, Planet, Quadrant, and Stand, and have been anthologized in the Forward Books of Poetry, as well as The Best British Poetry, edited by Roddy Lumsden. Reviewers of his work have variously described him as "a poet of both truth and beauty" (The Times Literary Supplement, 30 March 2012) and "a sort of William Blake for the twenty-first century" (Planet, Autumn 2008).

In the field of literary criticism, Grovier has written widely on the British Romantic poets, especially William Wordsworth, Samuel Taylor Coleridge, and John Keats. In a review of an edition of William Godwin's early letters, published in the TLS in March 2012, Grovier explored connections in Coleridge's poem The Rime of the Ancient Mariner (1797–98) with the life and pantheist thought of Walking Stewart, and proposed that Stewart was likely the real-life prototype for Coleridge's iconic wanderer.

His narrative history of London's notorious Newgate Prison, The Gaol, was published in July 2008 and was broadcast by BBC Radio as Book of the Week from 14–18 July. The abridgement was read by the classical stage actor Jasper Britton. The Gaol was "Pick of the Week" for both the Radio Times (14 July) and BBC (20 July), and "Pick of the Day" for The Guardian (12 July).

Grovier's art and literary reviews have appeared in The Observer and the Times Literary Supplement, to which he frequently contributes. In an article appearing in the TLS on 8 June 2012, Grovier revealed parallels in the design of Michelangelo's ceiling frescoes for the Sistine Chapel with both the performance structure and composition of the celebrated Renaissance polyphonic work, the Miserere mei. He suggested that the latter work was carefully crafted as a "soundtrack" to the former, and that the two, experienced together, were intended to comprise a single artistic whole.

Grovier has written extensively on leading contemporary artists, notably the Irish-American abstract painter Sean Scully and the American painter Cy Twombly. Grovier's articles on contemporary art are often preoccupied with situating the visual achievement of the artist concerned in its broader literary and cultural context. In an article on Twombly's 2009 exhibition The Rose (TLS, 1 May 2009), he coined the term "synphrasis" (from the Greek, meaning "speaking with", "uttering together") to describe the merging of visual and verbal art into a single work (for example, Twombly's incorporating lines of verse from the poet Rainer Maria Rilke's poem Les Roses (1924) onto the surface of his paintings, so that word and image become one) - a term which has subsequently been adopted into Byzantine studies.

Grovier's survey of contemporary art, 100 Works of Art That Will Define Our Age, is published by Thames & Hudson press in the UK, Thames & Hudson/W. W. Norton & Company in the United States, the Prestel imprint of Random House publishers in Germany (under the title Art Will Write the Story: The 100 Most Important Works of Our Time), and Ludion publishers in the Netherlands (under the title 100 Masterpieces of Our Time). The book goes in search of those works of art from 1989 to the present that have made the most enduring cultural and emotional impact. It features paintings, sculptures, drawings, installations, performances, and video pieces from the era's most influential artists including Ai Weiwei, Banksy, Matthew Barney, Louise Bourgeois, Lucian Freud, Mona Hatoum, Damien Hirst, Jeff Koons, Paula Rego, Gerhard Richter, Sean Scully, Cy Twombly, and Kara Walker. A subsequent overview, Art Since 1989, was published in November 2015 as part of Thames & Hudson's World of Art series.

== Works ==
- A Lens in the Palm (2008) Carcanet Press, Oxford Poets ISBN 1-903039-88-6 ISBN 978-1903039885
- The Gaol: The Story of Newgate – London's Most Notorious Prison (2009) John Murray (publisher), Hodder Headline ISBN 0-7195-6132-9 ISBN 978-0719561320
- The Sleepwalker at Sea (2011) Carcanet Press, Oxford Poets ISBN 1-906188-00-9 ISBN 978-1906188009
- Scully: Luz Del Sur (2012), catalogue text, TF Editores ISBN 978-84-15253-44-0
- Sean Scully: Doric (2012), exhibition catalogue text, Oliver Wood ISBN 978-0-9572303-0-9
- Liliane Tomasko: Vestige (September 2013), exhibition catalogue text, Timothy Taylor Gallery, London
- 100 Works of Art That Will Define Our Age (September 2013 UK; November 2013 U.S.) Thames & Hudson (publisher), ISBN 0-500239-07-X ISBN 978-0500239070
- Sean Scully Encounters: A New Master Among Old Masters (May 2014), exhibition catalogue text in verse, Christ Church Picture Gallery, Oxford University ISBN 9780955943119
- The Lantern Cage (2014) Carcanet Press, Oxford Poets ISBN 1-906188-13-0 ISBN 978-1906188139
- Art Since 1989 (World of Art series) (2015) Thames & Hudson (publisher)
- A New Way of Seeing: The History of Art in 57 Works (2019) Thames & Hudson ISBN 978-0500239636
- The Art of Colour: The History of Art in 39 Pigments (2023) Yale University Press ISBN 978-0300267785
