= Philip Dodd (author) =

British author, editor, and publisher

- Born: 24 November 1957 (age 68); Ipswich, Suffolk, England
- Education: Oxford University
- Occupations: Author, publisher, editor, publishing consultant
- Writing career
- Genres: Autobiography, rock'n'roll, non-fiction, jazz, travel, nostalgia, business

Philip Dodd (born 24 November 1957) is a British author, editor, and publisher best known for his work on books with high-profile musicians, TV stars and media personalities. He has collaborated with the Rolling Stones, Genesis, actor Philip Glenister and celebrity entrepreneur James Caan. Philip Glenister once said of Dodd: "Phil makes writing seem effortless. But only because you don’t see the craft and the graft that has to go into it". Dodd is also an author in his own right, having written several non-fiction books under his byline, such as The Reverend Guppy's Aquarium. A long-term jazz aficionado, he plays piano with the Philip Dodd Quartet, which performs regularly at London's 606 Club.

== History ==
Philip Dodd was born in Ipswich, Suffolk, on 24 November 1957, to Arthur and Esther Dodd, both teachers and dedicated crossword solvers. He attended the Royal Grammar School, High Wycombe before going on to read Modern Languages at Jesus College, Oxford. While at Jesus, Dodd founded Vague magazine, based on Andy Warhol's Interview magazine, Deluxe and Ritz Newspaper. The magazine won a Guardian Student Media Award in 1980. Vague alumni include Mandy Pooler, later Media Director of O&M Media and CEO of Mindshare, Paul Keers, launch editor of the British GQ magazine, the journalists Jane Shilling and Megan Tresidder, as well as the boss of private equity firm Terra Firma Capital Partners, Guy Hands and CEO/Chief Ombudsman for Legal Complaints, Adam Sampson.

=== Publishing career ===
Dodd worked as an editor and publisher for the Longman Group, Octopus and Virgin Publishing from 1981 to 1997. He was Chair of the Society of Young Publishers (SYP) in 1984, and a founder member of the Groucho Club. He was also an Editorial Fellow at the Jerusalem International Book Fair in 1985.

From 1997, Dodd worked as a publishing consultant with music and entertainment clients from his time at Virgin. He then developed, edited and co-wrote autobiographies with the Rolling Stones (According to the Rolling Stones, Weidenfeld & Nicolson, 2003), Nick Mason of Pink Floyd (Inside Out, W&N, 2004) and Genesis (Chapter and Verse, W&N, 2007) and books with ABBA and Mamma Mia!, Philip Glenister (Things Ain't What They Used To Be, Little Brown, 2008), James Caan of TV's Dragons' Den (Get The Job You Really Want, Penguin Portfolio, 2011) and the Rolling Stones manager Prince Rupert Loewenstein (A Prince Among Stones, Bloomsbury, 2013). Dodd's writing has been compared to that of Clive James, Hilaire Belloc and Stephen Fry, for its wry perceptiveness.

=== Author ===
As an author, Dodd wrote The Reverend Guppy’s Aquarium (Random House Books UK, Penguin USA, 2007), in which he explored the lives of people whose names give the English language some of its most colourful words, including Adolphe Sax, inventor of the saxophone; Roy Jacuzzi, inventor of the Jacuzzi Whirplool Bath, and Mercédès Jellinek, the daughter of Emil Jellinek – the Austrian businessman who founded the Mercedes car company.

He also wrote The Book of Rock (Pavilion, 2001) and with travel writer Ben Donald, The Book of Cities (Pavilion, 2004) and The Book of Islands (Palazzo, 2008). Dodd has written articles for the Guardian and the Mail on Sunday, as well as smaller publications. As a copywriter, he wrote the sleeve notes for the soundtrack album of the 2018 movie Mamma Mia! Here We Go Again.

== Music ==
Dodd plays piano with PDQ, the Philip Dodd Quartet – first formed at Oxford and then re-formed in 2006. The quartet, which also includes Paul Mason (tenor and soprano saxophones, and flute) Graham Brough (double bass) and Will Awdry (drums), has appeared annually at the 606 Club in Chelsea since 2010, and was the opening act for the Englischer Bahnhof jazz club in Husum, Germany in October 2016. They have also performed for fundraising events for Spotlight on Africa and the SVP's Sudan Baby Feeding Programme. Dodd credits tenor saxophonist Archie Shepp for first firing his interest in jazz. He also played keyboards alongside Mitch Mitchell of the Jimi Hendrix Experience and Screaming Lord Sutch at London's Hard Rock Café in 1990. In August 2019, Dodd was commissioned to write 'Arise, A Rose, Arisen', a chamber/choral piece for Rochester Cathedral, performed as part of the cathedral's 'Rose King of Rochester' Festival.

== Personal Background ==
Philip Dodd is married to Joanna Dodd, founder of PR firm Rochester PR Group. He lives in Rochester, Kent with his wife and two daughters.

== Works ==
=== Editor ===
- 1998, 2005 and 2010 Into the Red, by Nick Mason and Mark Hales
- 2003 According to the Rolling Stones, by Mick Jagger, Keith Richards, Charlie Watts, Ronnie Wood. Also Edited by Dora Loewenstein. Consulting Editor Charlie Watts
- 2004 Inside Out: A Personal History of Pink Floyd, by Nick Mason
- 2006 Mamma Mia! How Can I Resist You?, by Benny Andersson, Björn Ulvaeus, Judy Craymer
- 2007 Genesis: Chapter and Verse, by Tony Banks, Phil Collins, Peter Gabriel, Mike Rutherford
- 2008 Things Ain't What They Used To Be, by Philip Glenister
- 2013 A Prince Among Stones: That Business With the Rolling Stones and Other Adventures, by Prince Rupert Loewenstein

=== Consultant ===
- 2011 Get The Job You Really Want, by James Caan (entrepreneur)
- 2014 Forget Strategy, Get Results, by Michael Tobin
- 2018 Live, Love, Work, Prosper, by Michael Tobin

=== Author ===
- 2000 Collins Gem: Musical Instruments, by Philip Dodd and Ian Powling
- 2001 The Book of Rock, by Philip Dodd
- 2004 The Book of Cities, by Philip Dodd and Ben Donald
- 2007 The Reverend Guppy's Aquarium, by Philip Dodd
- 2008 The Book of Islands, by Philip Dodd and Ben Donald
- 2009 Michael Jackson: A Life in the Spotlight by Philip Dodd
- 2010 The Last Matchmaker, by Willie Daly, with Philip Dodd
- 2017 The Spirit of Rochester: Dame Sybil & the Thorndikes, by Philip Dodd
- 2020 If The War Comes, by Ann Mari Wallenberg, with Philip Dodd

== Publications ==
- http://issuu.com/sue-davis/docs/wow_medway_march_2011?mode=embed&layout=http%3A%2F%2Fskin.issuu.com%2Fv%2Flight%2Flayout.xml&showFlipBtn=true
