= Arthur Danto =

American art critic and philosopher (1924–2013)

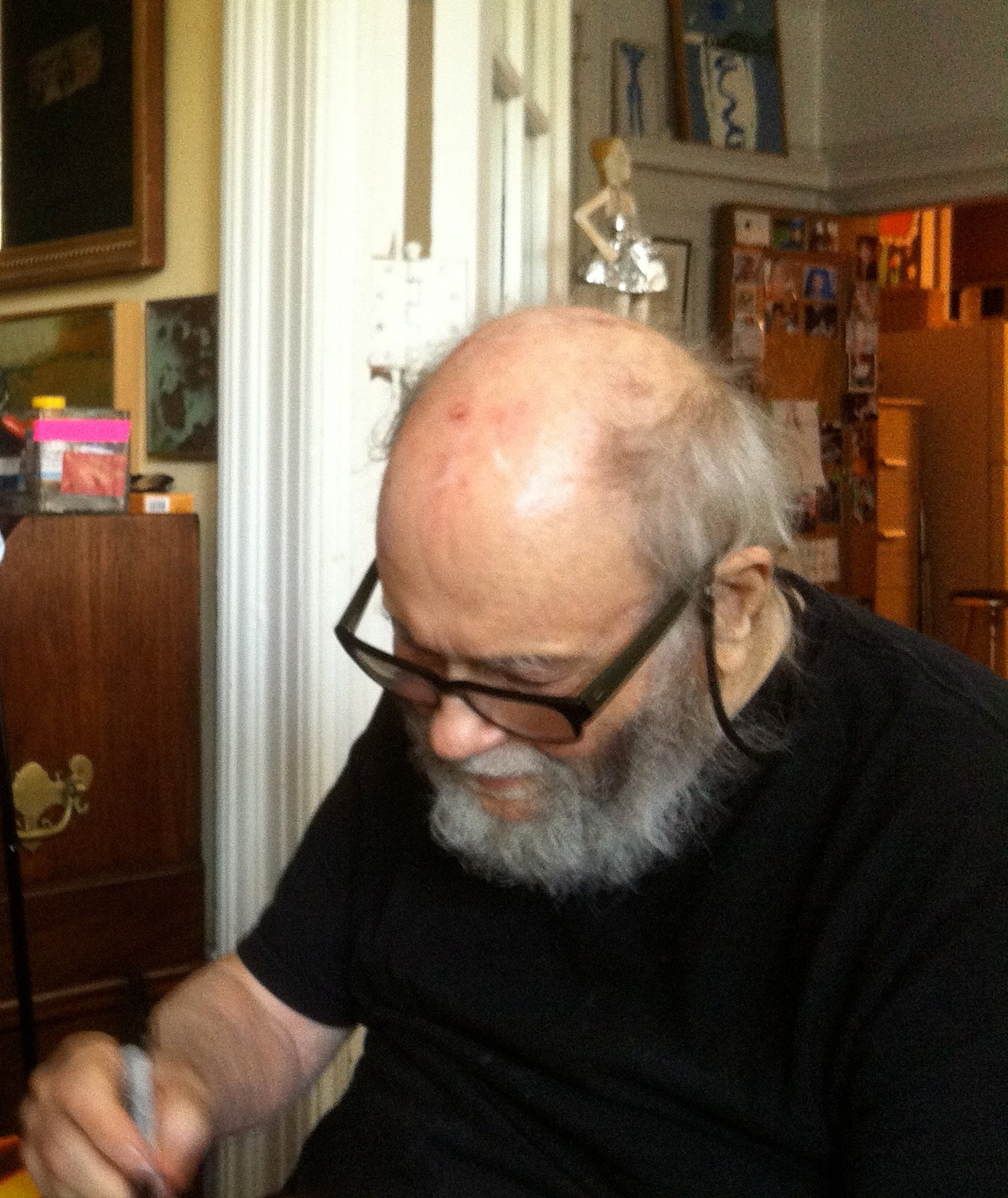
- Danto, 2012
- Born: Arthur Coleman Danto; January 1, 1924; Ann Arbor, Michigan, U.S.
- Died: October 25, 2013 (aged 89); New York City, U.S.

Education
- Education: Wayne State University (BA); Columbia University (MA, PhD); University of Paris
- Thesis: Acts and Histories (1952)
- Doctoral advisor: John Herman Randall Jr.
- Other advisors: Ernest Nagel; Jean Wahl

Philosophical work
- Era: 20th-century philosophy
- Region: Western philosophy
- School: Analytic
- Institutions: University of Colorado Boulder; Columbia University
- Main interests: Philosophy of art Philosophy of history Philosophy of action
- Notable ideas: End of art Indiscernible differences

Arthur Coleman Danto (January 1, 1924 – October 25, 2013) was an American art critic, philosopher, and professor at Columbia University. He was best known for having been a long-time art critic for The Nation and for his work in philosophical aesthetics and philosophy of history, though he contributed significantly to a number of fields, including the philosophy of action. His interests included thought, feeling, philosophy of art, theories of representation, philosophical psychology, Hegel's aesthetics, and the philosophers Friedrich Nietzsche and Jean-Paul Sartre.

== Life and career ==
Danto was born in Ann Arbor, Michigan, January 1, 1924, and grew up in Detroit. He was raised in a Reform Jewish home. After spending two years in the Army, Danto studied art and history at Wayne University (now Wayne State University). While an undergraduate, he intended to become an artist and began making prints in the Expressionist style in 1947 (these are now great rarities). He then pursued graduate study in philosophy at Columbia University. From 1949 to 1950, Danto studied at the University of Paris on a Fulbright scholarship under Jean Wahl, and in 1951 returned to teach at Columbia.

Upon retirement in 1992, he was named Johnsonian Professor Emeritus of Philosophy. He was twice awarded fellowships from the Guggenheim Foundation and was a member of the American Academy of Arts and Sciences, elected in 1980. He was one of the signers of the Humanist Manifesto. Danto died on October 25, 2013, aged 89 in Manhattan, New York City.

== Philosophical work ==
Arthur Danto argued that "a problem is not a philosophical problem unless it is possible to imagine that its solution will consist in showing how appearance has been taken for reality." While science deals with empirical problems, philosophy, according to Danto, examines indiscernible differences that lie outside of experience. Noel Carroll, writing as an art critic, has criticized Danto's anthropology, stating that Danto "believe[d] that persons are essentially systems of representation."

=== "Artworld" and the definition of art ===
Danto laid the groundwork for an institutional definition of art that sought to answer the questions raised by the emerging phenomenon of twentieth-century art. The definition of the term "art" is a subject of constant contention and many books and journal articles have been published arguing over the answer to the question "What is Art?" In terms of classificatory disputes about art, Danto takes a conventional approach. Non-conventional definitions take a concept like the aesthetic as an intrinsic characteristic in order to account for the phenomena of art. Conventional definitions reject this connection to aesthetic, formal, or expressive properties as essential to defining art but rather, in either an institutional or historical sense, say that "art" is basically a sociological category. Danto's "institutional definition of art" defines art as whatever art schools, museums, and artists consider art, regardless of further formal definition. Danto wrote on this subject in several of his works and a detailed treatment is to be found in Transfiguration of the Commonplace.

Danto stated, "A work of art is a meaning given embodiment." Danto further stated, also in Veery journal, "Criticism, other than of content, is really of the mode of embodiment."

The 1964 essay "The Artworld" in which Danto coined the term "artworld" (as opposed to the existing "art world", though they mean the same), by which he meant cultural context or "an atmosphere of art theory", first appeared in The Journal of Philosophy and has since been widely reprinted. It has had considerable influence on aesthetic philosophy and, according to professor of philosophy Stephen David Ross, "especially upon George Dickie's institutional theory of art. Dickie defined an art work as an artifact 'which has had conferred upon it the status of candidate for appreciation by some person or persons acting in behalf of a certain social institution (the artworld)' (p. 43.)"

According to the Stanford Encyclopedia of Philosophy, "Danto's definition has been glossed as follows: something is a work of art if and only if (i) it has a subject (ii) about which it projects some attitude or point of view (has a style) (iii) by means of rhetorical ellipsis (usually metaphorical) which ellipsis engages audience participation in filling in what is missing, and (iv) where the work in question and the interpretations thereof require an art historical context (Danto with Noël Carroll). Clause (iv) is what makes the definition institutionalist. The view has been criticized for entailing that art criticism written in a highly rhetorical style is art, lacking but requiring an independent account of what makes a context art historical, and for not applying to music."

After about 2005, Danto attempted to streamline his definition of art down to two principles: (i) art must have content or meaning and (ii) the art must embody that meaning in some appropriate manner.

=== The philosophical disenfranchisement of art ===
Danto's Hegelian position on the history of art and its reception was emphasized in his 1984 plenary address to the World Congress of Aesthetics held in Montreal in that year, and later published as the opening chapter in his book The Philosophical Disenfranchisement of Art. In the essay, Danto takes a contrary position to that of Plato who emphasized that art and artistic endeavors occupied an inferior position of importance among the endeavors of philosophers. Danto summarizes this ancient position of the Socratics with the phrase that "art is dangerous" on page four of the essay, which he then criticizes in the remainder of the essay.

=== The Hegelian end of art ===
The basic meaning of the term "art" has changed several times over the centuries and continued to evolve during the 20th century as well. Danto describes the history of Art in his own contemporary version of Hegel's dialectical history of art. "Danto is not claiming that no-one is making art anymore; nor is he claiming that no good art is being made any more. But he thinks that a certain history of western art has come to an end, in about the way that Hegel suggested it would." The "end of art" refers to the beginning of our modern era of art in which art no longer adheres to the constraints of imitation theory but serves a new purpose. Art began with an "era of imitation, followed by an era of ideology, followed by our post-historical era in which, with qualification, anything goes... In our narrative, at first only mimesis [imitation] was art, then several things were art but each tried to extinguish its competitors, and then, finally, it became apparent that there were no stylistic or philosophical constraints. There is no special way works of art have to be. And that is the present and, I should say, the final moment in the master narrative. It is the end of the story."

== Art criticism ==
Arthur Danto was an art critic for The Nation from 1984 to 2009, and also published numerous articles in other journals. In addition, he was an editor of The Journal of Philosophy and a contributing editor of the Naked Punch Review and Artforum. In art criticism, he published several collected essays, including Encounters and Reflections: Art in the Historical Present (Farrar, Straus & Giroux, 1990), which won the National Book Critics Circle Prize for Criticism in 1990; Beyond the Brillo Box: The Visual Arts in Post-Historical Perspective (Farrar, Straus & Giroux, 1992); Playing With the Edge: The Photographic Achievement of Robert Mapplethorpe (University of California, 1995); The Madonna of the Future: Essays in a Pluralistic Art World (Farrar, Straus & Giroux, 2000); and Unnatural Wonders: Essays from the Gap Between Art and Life (Columbia University Press, 2007).

In 1996, he received the Frank Jewett Mather Award for art criticism from the College Art Association. Danto's artist friend Sean Scully, to honor his long-term friendship with Danto, published the book Danto on Scully, bringing together the series of five essays Danto had written on the artist over the previous 20 years after Danto's death in 2013.

== Publications ==
=== Books ===
- Nietzsche as Philosopher (1965)
- Analytical Philosophy of History (1965)
- What Philosophy Is (1968)
- Analytical Philosophy of Knowledge (1968), republished, within additional material, as Narration and Knowledge (1985)
- Mysticism and Morality: Oriental Thought and Moral Philosophy (1969)
- Analytical Philosophy of Action (1973)
- Jean-Paul Sartre (1975), second edition Sartre (1991)
- The Transfiguration of the Commonplace (1981)
- The Philosophical Disenfranchisement of Art (1986)
- Connections to the World: The Basic Concepts of Philosophy (1989; with new preface, 1997)
- Encounters and Reflections: Art in the Historical Present (1990)
- Beyond the Brillo Box: The Visual Arts in Post-Historical Perspective (1992)
- After the End of Art (1997)
- The Abuse of Beauty (2003)
- Andy Warhol (2009)
- What Art Is (2013)
- Remarks on Art and Philosophy (2014)
- Art and Posthistory, Conversations on the End of Aesthetics written with Demetrio Paparoni (2022)

==== Essay collections ====
- The State of the Art (1987)
- Encounters and Reflections: Art in the Historical Present (1990)
- Embodied Meanings: Critical Essays and Aesthetic Meditations (1994)
- The Wake of Art: Criticism, Philosophy, and the Ends of Taste (1998)
- Philosophizing Art: Selected Essays (1999)
- The Body/Body Problem: Selected Essays (1999)
- The Madonna of the Future: Essays in a Pluralistic Art World (2000)
- Unnatural Wonders: Essays from the Gap Between Art and Life (2007)

=== Articles, book chapters and other works ===
- "The Artworld" (1964) Journal of Philosophy LXI, 571-584
- Introduction to: Playing With the Edge: The Photographic Achievement of Robert Mapplethorpe (1995)
- Hegel's End-of-Art Thesis (1999) preprint of article in: Wellbery, David E. (ed.) A New History of German Literature (2004)
- "The world as ruckus: Red Grooms and the spirit of Comedy" in Red Grooms (2004)
- "The Poetry of Meaning and Loss: The Glass Dresses of Karen LaMonte" (2005)
- (with Robert Fleck and Beate Söntgen) Peter Fischli David Weiss (a survey of their oeuvre) (2005)
- "Weaving as Metaphor and Model for Political Thought" in Sheila Hicks: Weaving as Metaphor (2006)
- "Architectural Principles in the Art of Sean Scully," Border Crossings, August 2007 #103 (2007)
