= Sue Hubbard =

English writer

- Born: London, England
- Education: University of East Anglia
- Occupations: Poet, novelist, art critic
- Writing career
- Genre: Non-fiction
- Website: suehubbard.com

Sue Hubbard is a British poet, novelist and art critic.

Hubbard has published three collections of poetry with her fourth due from Salmon Press, Ireland in 2020, three novels, a collection of short stories and a book on art. She has written for Time Out, New Statesman, The Independent and The Independent On Sunday. Her poems have been read on BBC Radio 3 and BBC Radio 4 and recorded for The Poetry Sound Archive.

The Poetry Society's only official Public Art Poet, her poem "Eurydice" was commissioned by the Arts Council and the British Film Institute for the walls of the underpass that leads to the IMAX cinema. This formed part of the regeneration of the South Bank designed by architect Bryan Avery. In 2009, the poem was painted over and then a campaign was launched to restore the poem on the walls of the underpass.

Hubbard's novel Rainsongs was published in 2018 by Duckworth London and Overlook NY. Hubbard has described it as 'a novel about my abiding themes: love, loss and redemption'.

== Background and career ==
Hubbard was born in London and grew up in Surrey, the eldest of three children, where she attended Claremont School and then Queen's College, Harley Street, London. Her first job was as a publishing assistant at Pergamon Press Oxford, after which she worked for the National Book League in Albemarle Street, leaving to start her own antique business specialising in 18th and 19th century jewellery.

In 1984, Hubbard moved back to London working as an art critic writing, first for Time Out, then for The Independent and the New Statesman.

In 1994, she published her first poetry collection and completed her master's in creative writing at the University of East Anglia. Hubbard's poetry collection The Forgetting and Remembering of Air was described by Ellen Bell in the New Welsh Review as 'a stunning piece of work – an achingly moving narrative of love for a child, parent, sibling, lover or icon'.

Hubbard has appeared on BBC Radio's Kaleidoscope, Front Row, The Verb and Poetry Please, and regularly appears on Sky News as an art critic. She has twice been a Hawthornden Fellow.

== Reception for Rainsongs ==
Hubbard's third novel was described as an "elegiac story of loss and valediction" by The Guardian. Martina Evans of The Irish Times said "Hubbard’s precise descriptions of the physical landscape are tremendous and moving." A review in The London Magazine describes the novel as having "a unique and beautiful emotive quality that shines through its delicately constructed prose." The Jewish Chronicle praised the novel as "a subtle, moving exploration of love, loss and parenthood."

== Works ==
=== Fiction ===
- 2000 - Depth of Field (Dewi Lewis)
- 2008 - Rothko's Red (Salt Publishing) Short stories
- 2012 - Girl In White (Cinnamon Press)
- 2018 - Rainsongs (Duckworth/Overlook)

=== Poetry collections ===
- 1994 - Everything Begins with the Skin (Enitharmon)
- 2000 - Oxford Poets Anthology (Carcanet)
- 2004 - Ghost Station (Salt Publishing)
- 2010 - The Idea of Islands (collaboration with artist Donal Teskey) (Occasional Press)
- 2013 - The Forgetting and Remembering of Air (Salt Publishing)

=== Art ===
- Adventures in Art: selected writings 1990-2010 (Other Criteria)
