= 606 Club =

Jazz club in Chelsea, London, England

Coordinates: 51.479°N 0.181°W

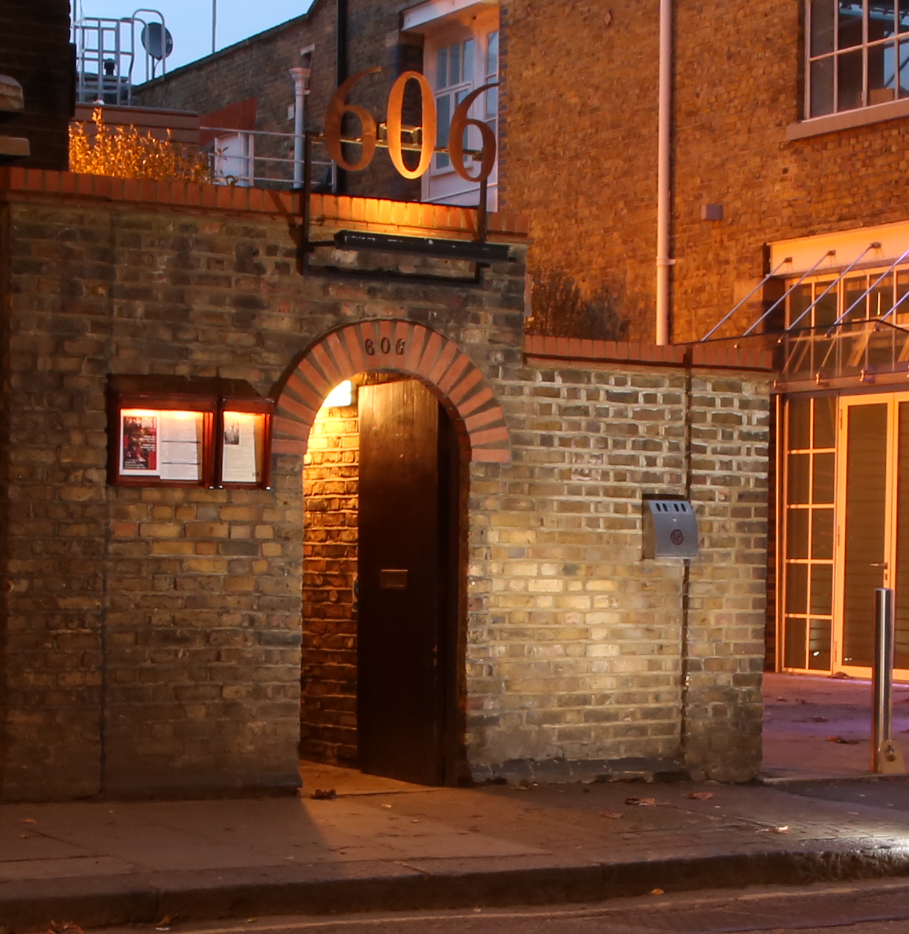
- The exterior of the 606 Club in Chelsea, London
- Interactive map of 606 Club
- Location: Chelsea, London
- Owner: Steve Rubie
- Capacity: 175
- Type: Live music venue & club

Website
- www.606club.co.uk

The 606 Club (also known as "The Six") is a jazz club in Chelsea, London. Located in a basement venue at 90 Lots Road in London SW10 (opposite Lots Road Power Station) and currently licensed for 175 people, it offers jazz, Latin, soul, R&B, blues and gospel music seven nights a week, and sometimes also on Sunday afternoons, making it one of the busiest jazz clubs in Europe.

According to musician Steve Rubie, who has owned and run the club since 1976, the club's history dates back to its emergence in the 1950s.

Originally a small 30-seater venue at 606 King's Road, the club moved to its current site in May 1988.

== See also ==
- List of jazz clubs
