= Blain Southern =

Art gallery

Blain|Southern
- Company type: Private
- Industry: Art gallery
- Genre: Contemporary art
- Founded: September 2010
- Founders: Harry Blain; Graham Southern
- Defunct: 2020
- Headquarters: London
- Key people: Harry Blain; Graham Southern
- Website: blainsouthern.com

Blain|Southern was a contemporary art gallery with branches in London, Berlin and New York. It was started in September 2010 by Harry Blain and Graham Southern, who had sold their previous gallery, Haunch of Venison, to Christie's. The gallery was originally at 21 Dering Street, but moved to 4 Hanover Square, London W1, in October 2012.

The London gallery opened on 13 October 2010 with an exhibition by Mat Collishaw. In 2011 the gallery opened a branch in the former print room of Der Tagesspiegel in the Potsdamer Straße in Berlin.

The first show was of work by Tim Noble and Sue Webster, with the participation of David Adjaye. Subsequent exhibitions have included drawings by Lucian Freud in 2012; a collaboration between Damien Hirst and Félix González-Torres in 2013; sculpture by Lynn Chadwick in 2014; work by Andreas Schmitten, Gereon Lepper and Mathias Lanfer, curated by Tony Cragg, in 2015; and Bill Viola’s Moving Stillness later that year. In May 2019, the gallery presented The Mariners Meadow by Cuban/American artist Enrique Martínez Celaya.

In 2019 the gallery opened a space in New York with an inaugural exhibition by Abdoulaye Konaté.

The gallery permanently closed all three locations in 2020, saying that it was "unable to secure the gallery’s future long term".
