= Harry Blain =

British art dealer

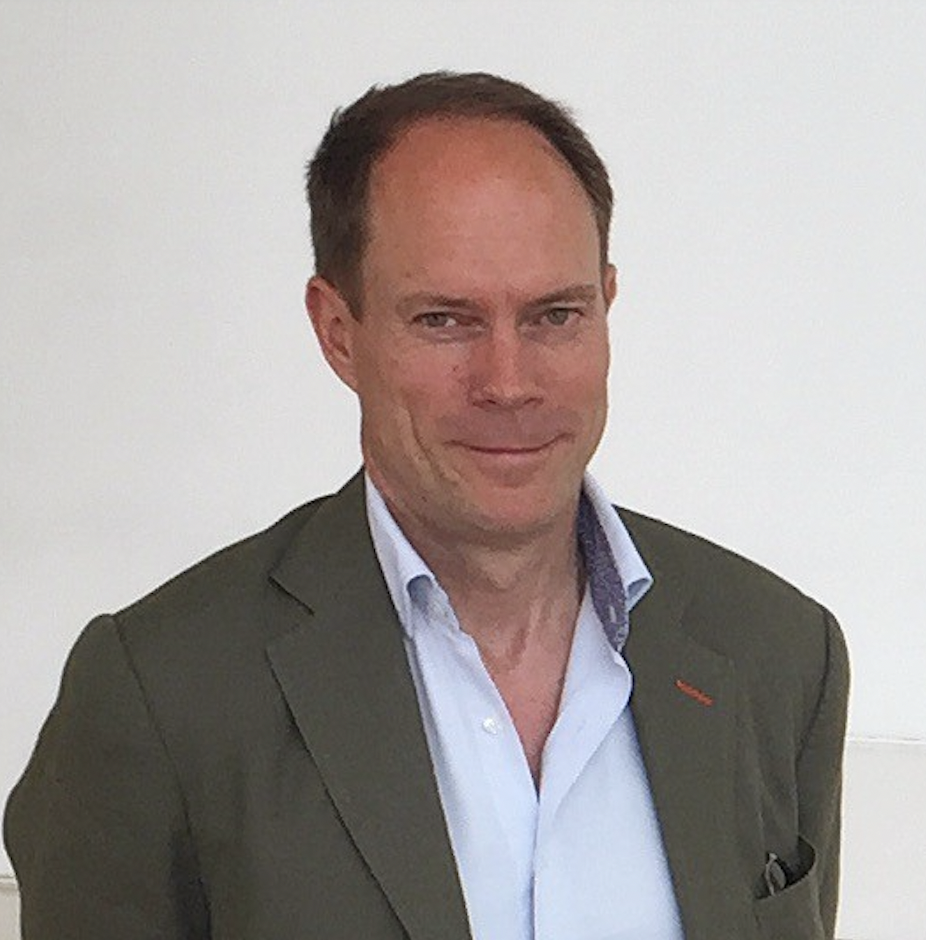
- Harry Blain, art dealer

Harry Blain is a British art dealer.

== Career ==
Blain opened his first gallery, Blains Fine Art, in 1992. It staged a number of notable exhibitions, including In the Eye of the Beholder, a group show which brought together works by Matisse, Degas and Andy Warhol, as well as London School, a show featuring paintings by Francis Bacon, Lucian Freud, Frank Auerbach and Leon Kossoff. In 2002, Blains Fine Art was renamed Haunch of Venison, taking its name from the street in Mayfair where it was located. Exhibitions included surveys of Abstract Expressionism and late twentieth century Russian art in New York and London respectively. It also acquired spaces in Berlin, Zurich, New York and Moscow designed by David Adjaye and Caruso St John. Haunch of Venison was acquired by Christie’s in 2007, with Blain running the auction house's Global private sales. The gallery subsequently moved to 6 Burlington Gardens, formerly the home of The Museum of Mankind. The gallery represented more than 50 artists, including five Turner Prize winners, amongst them Rachel Whiteread, Tony Cragg and Richard Long. In 2010, Blain, along with fellow director Graham Southern, set up a new gallery, Blain|Southern, with spaces in London and New York, while also founding with Emmanuel di Donna, Blain di Donna, which focussed on Modern Art. Blain|Southern staged a number of highly praised exhibitions, including Lucian Freud Drawings, Damien Hirst and Felix Gonzalez-Torres: Candy, as well as shows by Bill Viola, Marcel Duchamp and Edward Kienholz. The gallery closed in 2020, and since then Blain has worked closely with a number of clients, assisting them in building their collections.

== Other projects ==
Blain co-founded Sedition in 2011, establishing the first online marketplace for collectors to buy, share and sell digital artworks. Sedition is acknowledged as the forerunner to NFT’s.

== Personal life ==
Blain has been married twice and has four children. He actively supports various charities, including the Naked Heart Foundation and has co-chaired events such as the NSPCC Ball. He has frequently been listed as one of Britain’s most influential dealers. He had a part in the Wim Wenders film, Palermo Shooting, in which he played an art dealer called Harry, appearing alongside Lou Reed, Dennis Hopper, Milla Jovovich and Peter Lindberhg.
