= Danilo Eccher =

Italian art critic and curator

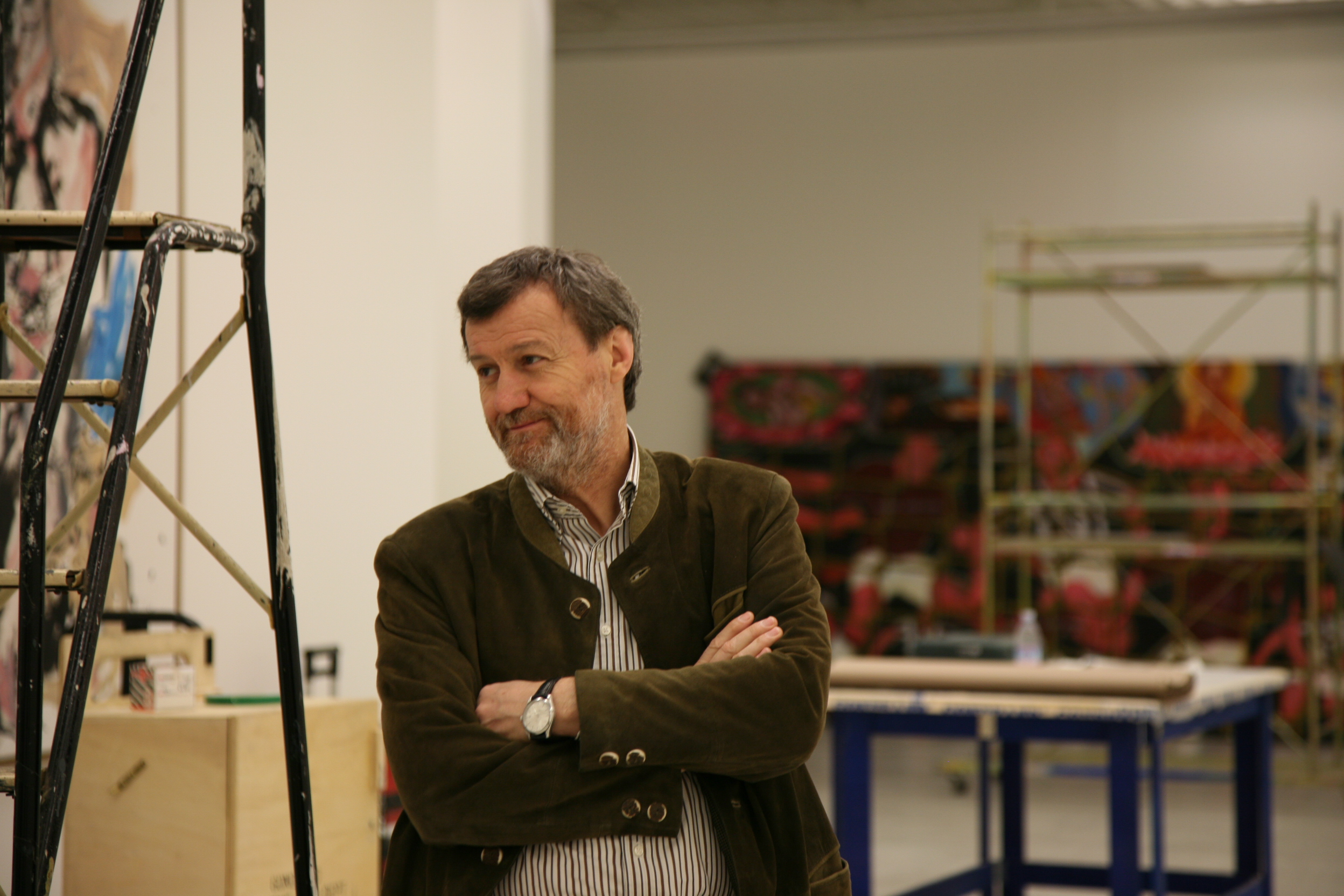
Danilo Eccher in 2011

Danilo Eccher (Tione, Italy, June 27, 1953) is an Italian art critic and curator.

== Biography ==
Eccher is the former director of Galleria Civica d'Arte Contemporanea di Trento in Trento (1989-1995), GAM - Galleria d'Arte Moderna, Bologna in Bologna (1996-2000), MACRO - Museum of Contemporary Art of Rome (2001-2008), GAM Galleria Civica d'Arte Moderna e Contemporanea in Turin (2009-2014).

As a curator, Eccher focused on contemporary painting, working with Anselm Kiefer, Georg Baselitz, Cecily Brown, Francesco Clemente, Roy Lichtenstein, Jenny Saville, Sean Scully, Julian Schnabel, Ettore Spalletti, and Tom Wesselmann. He curated solo exhibitions of Tony Cragg, Wolfgang Laib, Marisa Merz, and Hermann Nitsch. At GAM Turin he was the first Italian director adopting a thematic display.

In 1993 Eccher was a member of the artistic committee of the 45th Visual Arts Venice Biennial, co-curating the international exhibition 'La Coesistenza dell'arte'.

From 2002 through 2006 Eccher was co-director of the Master Class for “Contemporary Art and Architecture Curators”, Sapienza University of Rome.

From 2009 through 2011 Eccher was president of the Fondazione Galleria Civica di Trento.

Since 2015 Eccher has been working as an independent curator, realizing solo exhibitions of Jannis Kounellis, Albert Oehlen, Sean Scully, Christian Boltanski and the group exhibitions Love (2016), Enjoy (2017), and Dream (2018) at the Chiostro del Bramante, in Rome. He is teaching "Philosophy of curatorship" at university of Turin

== Exhibitions ==
Mario Schifano (1986); Luigi Veronesi (1988); Nunzio (1989); Luigi Mainolfi (1989).

=== Galleria Civica d'Arte Contemporanea di Trento ===
Enzo Cucchi (1990); Hermann Nitsch (1991); Mimmo Paladino (1992); Vettor Pisani (1992); Marco Gastini (1993); Tony Cragg (1994); Mario Merz (1994); Yoko Ono (1995); Emilio Vedova (1996).

=== Galleria d'Arte Moderna, Bologna ===
Solo-shows: Gilbert & George (1996); Sean Scully (1996); Julian Schnabel (1996); Christian Boltanski (1997); Georg Baselitz (1997); Salvo (1997); Marisa Merz (1998); Shirin Neshat and Vanessa Beecroft (1998); Anselm Kiefer (1999); Francesco Clemente (1999); Mat Collishaw (2000); Francesco Vezzoli (2000); group exhibitions: 'Materiali Anomali' (1997); 'Pittura Iconica' (1997); 'Arte Aniconica' 1998; 'Appearance' (2000); 'L'Ombra della Ragione' (2000).

=== MACRO - Museo di arte contemporanea, Rome ===
Solo-shows: Tony Oursler (2002); Vik Muniz (2003); Cecilyn Brown (2003); Paola Pivi (2003); Simon Starling (2003); Michal Rovner (2003); Tatsuo Miyajima (2004); Tom Wesselmann (2005); Wolfgang Laib (2005); Jenny Saville (2005); Alfredo Jaar (2005); Marc Quinn (2006); Pedro Cabrita Reis (2006), Christian Boltanski (2006); Gadha Amer (2007); AES+F (2008); Gregor Schneider (2008); Paolo Canevari (2008); Ernesto Neto (2008); group exhibitions: ChinArt (2002); Ipotesi di Collezione (2003); Mediterraneans (2004); Nuove Acquisizioni (2005); La città che sale (2007).

=== GAM - Galleria Civica d'Arte Moderna e Contemporanea, Turin ===
Solo-shows:Osvaldo Licini: Masterworks (2010)Salvatore Scarpitta (2013), Nicola De Maria (2013), Ettore Spalletti (2014), Juliao Sarmento (2014), Roy Lichtenstein: Opera Prima (2014), Cecily Brown (2014); group exhibitions:The Theatre of Performance (2009), Keep Your Seat (2010), EROI (Heroes) (2011)
