= Catherine Lee (painter) =

American painter

- Born: 1950 (age 75–76); Pampa, Texas
- Education: San José State University
- Known for: Painting, Sculpting, Printmaking

Catherine Lee (born 1950 in Pampa, Texas) is an American painter, sculptor and printmaker. Her works, featuring repetitive forms in various materials (including canvas, bronze, iron, glass, and ceramics) have been described as minimalist and structuralist.

== Biography ==
Lee grew up in Pampa, Texas. She studied at San Jose State University in San Jose, California, where she earned a bachelor's degree in studio art in 1974. Lee was married to abstract artist Sean Scully from 1978 to 1998. She lived in New York City for 32 years and returned to Texas in late 1990s, settling in the Hill Country near Austin. Some of her work is currently held and can be seen in the collections of New York's Museum of Modern Art, the Carnegie Museum in Pittsburgh, and the Houston Museum of Fine Arts. Some of her sculptures are also available for purchase on Artnet.

== Work ==
Catherine Lee's sculptures (as small as a fist or as large as a sedan standing on end) are faceted polyhedra or polygons made from cast metal or clay. Hung on the wall, freestanding, or situated on plain steel pedestals or shelves — "some are singular works, others are grids of dozens of nearly identical, handmade components". She would personally describe herself as an abstract artist because she has such a strong personal attachment to abstraction, explaining how her work "refers to things in the world tangentially, but it’s not at all representational." She creates both paintings and sculptures, but doesn't have a preference for one over the other. She thinks of painting as more emotionally engaging, whereas she thinks of sculpture-making as problem-solving.

Lee held her first solo exhibition in 1977 at the Duffy-Gibbs Gallery in New York City, and her work has been subsequently displayed in several public and private collections. A Los Angeles Times review of her 1988 solo exhibition at Michael Maloney Gallery describes her work as small, quirky wall pieces consisting of oddly shaped, individually colored or bronze elements that nestle closely together, often in a jigsaw fashion. She often utilizes black and monochrome colors in her works because she appreciates the hostility these colors can bring to each piece.

In 2012, she was the featured artist of the West Texas Triangle, group of five art museums in western Texas. Her work Unica 39 (1987), an "abstract monotype in color", is a part of the permanent exhibition in the Tate Gallery. Lee's favored method of making ceramic artwork is Raku due to the original and how it is highly impossible to reproduce the same result again.

== Teaching ==
Lee has taught at Princeton University (1980), Rochester Institute of Technology (1982), the University of Texas at San Antonio (1983) and (2000), and Columbia University (1986–1987).

== Collections ==
- Indianapolis Museum of Art
- Museum of Fine Arts, Houston
- Tate Gallery, London
- The Metropolitan Opera,
- Museum of Modern Art
- Lora Reynolds gallery
- Nasher Sculpture Center, Dallas

== Solo exhibitions ==
A list of Catherine Lee's exhibitions taken from the book Catherine Lee, the Alphabet Series and Other Works by the Pamela Auchincloss Gallery.

Year	City	Gallery
1980	Queens, New York	MoMA PS1
1983	San Antonio	The University of Texas
1984	Akron	John Davis Gallery
1985	New York	Gallery Bellman
1985	Akron	John Davis Gallery
1986	New York	John Davis Gallery
1987	New York	John Davis Gallery
1988	Santa Monica	Michael Maloney Gallery
1989	London	Annely Juda Fine Art
1989	Boston	Thomas Segal Gallery
1990	New York	Marisa del Re Gallery
1990	Paris	Galerie Karsten Greve
1990	Osaka	Gallery Kasahara
1990	San Francisco	Stephen Wirtz Gallery
1991	Zürich	Galerie Jamileh Weber
1991	Cologne	Galerie Karsten Greve
1991	Nagoya	Kohji Ogura Gallery
1992	Munich	Städtische Galerie im Lenbachhaus
1992	Linz	Neue Galerie der Stadt Linz
1992	Copenhagen	Galleri Weinberger
1993	New York City	Galerie Lelong
1994	Birmingham, Michigan	Hill Gallery
1995	Paris	Galerie Karsten Greve
1995	Copenhagen	Galleri Weinberger
1995	New York City	Galerie Lelong
1995	Köln	Galerie Karsten Greve
1995	Tokyo	Mizuma Art Gallery
1996	Salzburg	Galerie Academia
1997	Paris	Galerie Karsten Greve
1998	Köln	Galerie Karsten Greve
1999	New York City	Galerie Lelong

== Early life ==
Growing up, Lee had her first experience with art in the third grade when she was living in Germany at an army base. She attended a local art museum in Kaiserslautern, and explains how she was "stunned by the sense of quiet, of reverence." She spent the majority of her career living and working in New York, NY.
