= List of Grizzy & the Lemmings episodes =

A list of episodes from Grizzly & the Lemmings

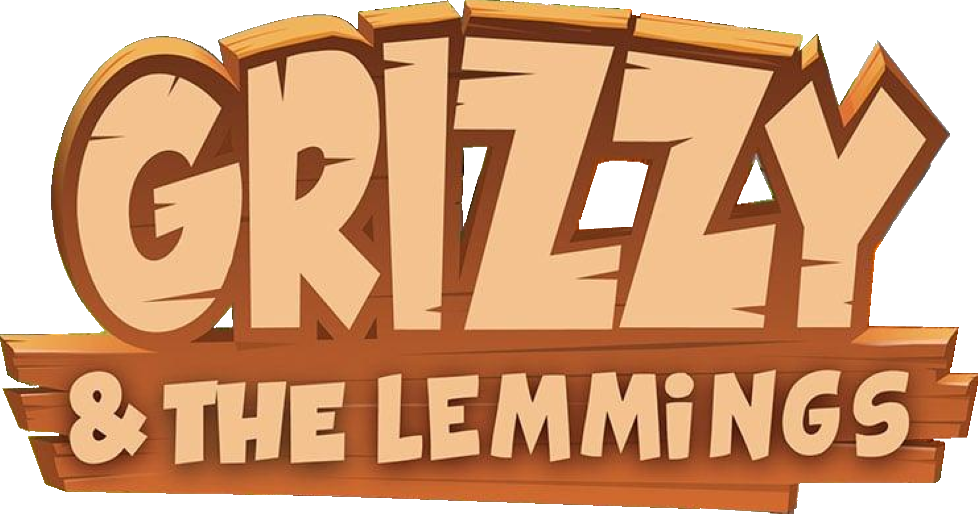
Grizzy & the Lemmings logo

Grizzy & the Lemmings is a French animated television series created by Antoine Rodelet and Josselin Charier. It is produced by Hari Productions for France Télévisions, Cartoon Network, and Boomerang's cable and streaming service. The show has been awarded the Best Animated Series Kids Programming at the 2018 Kidscreen Awards and Best Youth Programme at Lauriers de la Radio et de la Télévision 2018.

This is a list of episodes of the series, with their names (in English and French), including season number, the original air date, and an episode plot.

== Season overview ==
Season	Segments	Episodes	Originally released		
Season	Segments	Episodes	First released	Last released	Network
1	78	26	October 10, 2016	November 17, 2017	France 3 Cartoon Network; Boomerang; Netflix; Pop
2	78	26	September 2, 2018	May 24, 2019	France 3 Cartoon Network; Boomerang; Netflix; Pop
Shorts			September 4, 2019	March 27, 2020	Official website YouTube channel
3	78	26	September 21, 2021	March 15, 2022	France 4 Cartoon Network; Boomerang; Okoo; Netflix; CBBC
4	78	26	May 15, 2024	January 28, 2025	France 4 Cartoon Network; Boomerang; Okoo; Netflix; CBBC

== Episodes ==
=== Season 1 (2016–17) ===
No. overall	No. in season	Title	Directed by	Written by	Storyboard by	Original release date	France viewers (millions)
1a	1a	"Polar Bear" "(Ours polaire)"	Victor Moulin	Antoine Rodelet; Josselin Charier; Alexandre So	Joan Gouviac	October 10, 2016	0.09
When an unbearable heat wave hits Nutty Hill, Grizzy tries to take refuge in a refrigerator full of Lemmings.
1b	1b	"Bear Spread" "(Ours à tartiner)"	Victor Moulin	Antoine Rodelet; Josselin Charier	Joan Gouviac	October 10, 2016	0.09
As Grizzy goes to prep for a bear-sized feast, he discovers the Lemmings have used his delicious ingredients for a food affair.
1c	1c	"Cellular Bear" "(Ours cellulaire)"	Victor Moulin	Josselin Charier; Victor Moulin; Antoine Rodelet; Alexandre So	Joan Gouviac	October 11, 2016	0.09
When the ranger's smartphone grabs Grizzy's undivided attention, the Lemmings work to regain access to its music app.
2a	2a	"Jurassic Bear" "(Jurassique ours)"	Victor Moulin	Josselin Charier; Victor Moulin; Antoine Rodelet; Alexandre So	Joan Gouviac	October 11, 2016	0.15
After a mysterious egg hatches at Grizzy's front door, he struggles to tolerate the newest addition (a dinosaur) to the Lemmings' squad.
2b	2b	"Extreme Fitness" "(Extrême fitness)"	Victor Moulin	Josselin Charier; Victor Moulin; Antoine Rodelet; Alexandre So	Joan Gouviac	October 12, 2016	0.07
Before Grizzy can impress she-bear by slimming down, he must first kick the Lemmings off the workout machines they use as an amusement park.
2c	2c	"Domestic Robots" "(Robots domestiques)"	Victor Moulin	Josselin Charier; Victor Moulin; Antoine Rodelet; Alexandre So	Joan Gouviac	October 12, 2016	0.07
A bumper car or a back massager? Grizzy and the Lemmings fight over the ranger's new robot vacuum cleaner.
3a	3a	"Mass Control" "(Contrôle des masses)"	Victor Moulin	Josselin Charier; Victor Moulin; Antoine Rodelet; Alexandre So	Fanny Marseau	October 13, 2016	N/A
With one high-tech remote, Grizzy controls the entire cabin. But with great power to rid himself of the Lemmings comes the chance for things to go awry.
3b	3b	"Bear Under Control" "(Ours sous contrôle)"	Victor Moulin	Josselin Charier; Victor Moulin; Antoine Rodelet; Alexandre So	Fanny Marseau	October 14, 2016	0.10
For the love of Grizzy's beloved chocolate spread, the Lemmings try their best to break open the fridge without waking him up.
3c	3c	"Popcorn Party" "(Pop corn party)"	Victor Moulin	Josselin Charier; Victor Moulin; Antoine Rodelet; Alexandre So; Fanny Marseau	Fanny Marseau	October 15, 2016	1.63
When Grizzy invites She-Bear over for a buttery snack, he must first wrestle with the Lemmings for the kernels.
4a	4a	"Dancing with the Bears" "(Danse avec les ours)"	Idriss Benseghir	Idriss Benseghir; Josselin Charier; Victor Moulin; Antoine Rodelet; Alexandre So	Joan Gouviac	October 16, 2016	N/A
Competition for the ranger's boombox heats up when Grizzy plots to use it for salsa dance lessons, while the Lemmings have, well, other plans.
4b	4b	"Role Change" "(Échange standard)"	Victor Moulin	Josselin Charier; Victor Moulin; Antoine Rodelet; Alexandre So	Joan Gouviac	October 17, 2016	N/A
Grizzy undergoes an identity crisis after a run-in with a metal pan. Can the Lemmings help him get back to normal?
4c	4c	"Lemming Tonic"	Victor Moulin	Josselin Charier; Antoine Rodelet	Fanny Marseau	April 14, 2017	N/A
Grizzy just wants a nap. But his claim to the couch becomes a battle of wills with the ultra-hyper Lemmings after they discover its bouncy ability.
5a	5a	"Bear Itch" "(Ours à gratter)"	Victor Moulin	Josselin Charier; Victor Moulin; Antoine Rodelet; Alexandre So	Joan Gouviac	April 17, 2017	N/A
The cabin is infested with fleas, and Grizzy's efforts to rid his home of the pesky parasites come to a pause when the Lemmings refuse to let him throw them out. Note:- This is the only season 1 episode in which fleas appear in.
5b	5b	"Thirst Quencher" "(Ours à sec)"	Victor Moulin	Josselin Charier; Victor Moulin; Antoine Rodelet; Alexandre So	Joan Gouviac	April 18, 2017	N/A
When a second heat wave hits Nutty Hill, the Lemmings use the last sources of water for their pool while Grizzy tries to quench his thirst.
5c	5c	"Spider Lemmings"	Victor Moulin	Josselin Charier; Victor Moulin; Antoine Rodelet; Alexandre So	Joan Gouviac	April 19, 2017	N/A
Grizzy's fear of spiders -- and even more so the Lemmings' use of its web for bungee jumping -- complicates his ability to kill one.
6a	6a	"Random Bear" "(Ours aléatoire)"	Victor Moulin	Josselin Charier; Victor Moulin; Antoine Rodelet; Alexandre So	Fanny Marseau	April 20, 2017	N/A
When a giant Yummy jar is the grand prize in a competition, Grizzy and the Lemmings fight to win the jackpot.
6b	6b	"Lemming Interference" "(Ours à l'antenne)"	Victor Moulin	Josselin Charier; Antoine Rodelet	Fanny Marseau; Charles Vaucelle	April 21, 2017	N/A
The Lemmings jump into the pool from Grizzy's television antenna. This creates interference on Grizzy's television, so Grizzy intervenes.
6c	6c	"High Voltage Bear Attack" "(Ours à haute tension)"	Victor Moulin	Josselin Charier; Victor Moulin; Antoine Rodelet; Alexandre So	Joan Gouviac	April 24, 2017	N/A
Due to a permanent power outage, neither Grizzy can watch TV nor the Lemmings can party. Later, Grizzy sees the Lemmings partying at another power source, so he fights over it.
7a	7a	"Bear Scents" "(Ours au parfum)"	Victor Moulin	Josselin Charier; Victor Moulin; Antoine Rodelet; Alexandre So	Joan Gouviac	April 25, 2017	0.24
To please his beloved she-bear, Grizzy brings her flowers. But will the delightful smell be eclipsed by the Lemmings' dung pit-diving endeavors?
7b	7b	"Bear Luck" "(Coup de pot d'ours)"	Victor Moulin	Josselin Charier; Victor Moulin; Antoine Rodelet	Joan Gouviac	April 26, 2017	N/A
After a terrible day filled with embarrassment and frustration, Grizzy finds a four-leaf clover that could turn his luck around.
7c	7c	"Magnetic Bear" "(Ours magnétique)"	Victor Moulin	Josselin Charier; Victor Moulin; Antoine Rodelet; Alexandre So	Isabelle Lemaux	April 27, 2017	N/A
As the Lemmings trick Grizzy with a powerful magnet, he uses their shenanigans to impress his beloved she-bear.
8a	8a	"Bear Charm" "(Ours charmant)"	Victor Moulin	Josselin Charier; Victor Moulin; Antoine Rodelet; Alexandre So	Isabelle Lemaux	April 28, 2017	N/A
Grizzy sparks a fairytale frenzy when he's convinced his she-bear turned into a frog. But the Lemmings have other plans for their new croaking friend.
8b	8b	"Bear's Best Friend" "(Le meilleur ami de l'ours)"	Victor Moulin	Josselin Charier; Fanny Marseau; Victor Moulin; Antoine Rodelet	Fanny Marseau	May 1, 2017	N/A
When Grizzy adopts a baby raccoon, it's up to him to protect the tiny creature from the Lemmings' dangerous games.
8c	8c	"Super Grizzy Bros"	Victor Moulin	Josselin Charier; Victor Moulin; Antoine Rodelet; Alexandre So	Joan Gouviac	May 2, 2017	N/A
Grizzy starts playing video games on the console. The Lemmings want to try their hand at the joystick but Grizzy refuses to interrupt his kart racing game. The Lemmings brought another joystick and starts playing with Grizzy. Both of them think they will win.
9a	9a	"Fake Brother" "(Faux frère)"	Charles Vaucelle	Josselin Charier; Valérie Chappellet; Charles Vaucelle; Simon LeCocq; Antoine Rodelet	Charles Vaucelle	May 3, 2017	0.13
Grizzy builds a look-alike robot to keep the Lemmings away while he prepares a party of popcorn for his beloved she-bear. But his double's artificial intelligence leaves a lot to be desired.
9b	9b	"Mind in a Whirl" "(Tête à l'envers)"	Charles Vaucelle	Valérie Chappellet; Josselin Charier; Charles Vaucelle; Simon LeCocq; Antoine Rodelet	Émilie Phuong	May 4, 2017	N/A
After hitting her head and seeing a lemming in front of it, She-bear is convinced that she is a lemming and starts playing with their group. Grizzy believes another well-aimed hit will correct her thinking, but the Lemmings are thrilled to have a new playmate.
9c	9c	"A Sizeable Problem" "(Problème de taille)"	Victor Moulin	Josselin Charier; Victor Moulin; Antoine Rodelet; Alexandre So	Isabelle Lemaux	May 5, 2017	0.19
When a meteorite falls not far from the cabin, strange blue and red colored berries start to grow. A partridge eats a blueberry. Grizzy and the lemmings find out that the blueberry makes someone become large and the red berry makes someone become small when someone eats it. So the Lemmings start having fun on a big partridge.
10a	10a	"Treasure Bear" "(Ours au trésor)"	Victor Moulin	Josselin Charier; Victor Moulin; Antoine Rodelet; Alexandre So	Clément Girard	May 8, 2017	0.08
Under the wood floor of the log cabin, Grizzy and the Lemmings discover the entrance to an underground gallery with an old treasure map that indicates the location of a treasure.
10b	10b	"In the Service of His Majesty" "(Au service de sa corpulence)"	Victor Moulin	Josselin Charier; Victor Moulin; Antoine Rodelet; Alexandre So	Isabelle Lemaux	May 9, 2017	N/A
Lemmings brought home an antique object, which has magic, and when Grizzy picks up the object in hand, he sees the Lemmings bow low before him and behave like his servants. One of the Lemming of their group, tries to stop this.
10c	10c	"Bear Art" "(Œuvre d'ours)"	Victor Moulin	Josselin Charier; Victor Moulin; Antoine Rodelet; Alexandre So	Isabelle Lemaux	May 10, 2017	N/A
Grizzy tries to impress the she-bear by making a sculpture of her from a piece of wood. But as soon as the Grizzy's back is turned, the Lemmings gnaw at the work of art in order to transform it into a toboggan slide. After it is destroyed due to fire, Grizzy goes to make a sculpture of a she-bear with rock stone. But the Lemmings' have other plans.
11a	11a	"Happy Birthday Lemmings!" "(Happy Birthday Lemming)"	Victor Moulin	Josselin Charier; Antoine Rodelet	Joan Gouviac	May 11, 2017	N/A
The Lemmings had planned a surprise birthday party for one of them. When Happy Birthday rings out, the surprise is as great for Grizzy, who is trying to take a nap after a hearty meal, as it is for the birthday Lemming hero in question.
11b	11b	"Flower Power"	Victor Moulin	Josselin Charier; Victor Moulin; Antoine Rodelet; Alexandre So	Bruno Guerra; Fanny Marseau	May 12, 2017	N/A
A gust of wind sweeps away the flower that Grizzy's adored she-bear wears in her hair. Grizzy sees this as a golden opportunity to dazzle her by bringing it back. On the other hand lemmings also want the same flower for moose, so that they can play.
11c	11c	"Teleportation's the Way to Go!" "(Téléportez, c'est gagné)"	Victor Moulin	Josselin Charier; Victor Moulin; Antoine Rodelet	Émilie Phuong	May 15, 2017	N/A
Grizzy finds two magical communicating vessels in the forest, and if he sticks his hand in one, it comes out the other, regardless of the distance between them.
12a	12a	"Bear Countdown" "(Ours à rebours)"	Victor Moulin	Josselin Charier; Victor Moulin; Antoine Rodelet; Alexandre So	Claire Dufresne	May 16, 2017	0.15
Grizzy finds a vintage stopwatch in the cabin's garage which lets one wind back the minute that has just passed by, and it can even stop time and movement in one's surroundings.
12b	12b	"Lemming Airlines" "(Lemmings airlines)"	Victor Moulin	Josselin Charier; Victor Moulin; Antoine Rodelet; Alexandre So	Bruno Guerra	May 17, 2017	0.12
Grizzy is disturbed by a flow of incongruous objects that have been transformed into hot-air balloons by the lemmings.
12c	12c	"Relax Bear" "(Ours relax)"	Charles Vaucelle	Valérie Chappellet; Josselin Charier; Charles Vaucelle; Simon LeCocq; Antoine Rodelet	Isabelle Lemaux	May 18, 2017	N/A
Grizzy found a multi-function Stressless recliner ranger's cabin and sat on it to relax. But the Lemmings also want the chair and they want to transform it into a fearsome multi-game chair.
13a	13a	"Bear Gliding" "(Ça plane pour l'ours)"	Clément Girard	Valérie Chappellet; Josselin Charier; Charles Vaucelle; Simon LeCocq; Antoine Rodelet	Émilie Phuong	May 19, 2017	0.09
The Lemmings play kite surf with a homemade kite. Grizzy notices that the she-bear watches the kite perform arabesques in the sky with admiration. He also wants to make a kite for she-bear.
13b	13b	"The Sound of a Lemming" "(Sur un air de lemming)"	Charles Vaucelle	Simon LeCocq; Antoine Rodelet; Charles Vaucelle; Valérie Chappellet; Josselin Charier	Bruno Guerra	May 22, 2017	N/A
Grizzy snatches the last jar of chocolate spread Yummy XL out from the Lemmings. To snatch the chocolate from Grizzy they start whistling a mini-flute to disturb him. When Grizzy throws them on the road, fallen by a vehicle, the lemmings find a magical flute, which make any living or non-living thing to dance.
13c	13c	"Bear in the Wind" "(Ours dans le vent)"	Charles Vaucelle	Josselin Charier; Victor Moulin; Antoine Rodelet; Alexandre So	Isabelle Lemaux	May 23, 2017	N/A
The Lemmings wants to play a new game, floating like flags in the breeze from the fan set on maximum. But Grizzy quickly rids the living room of this interference.
14a	14a	"Construction Bear" "(Ours de construction)"	Victor Moulin	Josselin Charier; Victor Moulin; Antoine Rodelet; Alexandre So	Bruno Guerra	May 24, 2017	0.14
The Lemmings have a grand old time tearing down their Kapla block buildings, which they rebuild just as fast. Grizzy remarks that she-bear is impressed by a block building. So he tries to make one for himself.
14b	14b	"Kung Fu Lemmings"	Victor Moulin	Josselin Charier; Victor Moulin; Antoine Rodelet	Claire Dufresne	May 25, 2017	0.12
The Lemmings draw inspiration from lessons they find in a martial arts book and start breaking every wooden object they can get their hands on into two. When Grizzy tries to stop them, they go on to the next lesson and get him in a judo hold.
14c	14c	"A Midsummer Bear's Dream" "(Songe d'une nuit d'ours)"	Victor Moulin	Josselin Charier; Victor Moulin; Antoine Rodelet; Alexandre So	Isabelle Lemaux	May 26, 2017	0.10
Grizzy dreams that he is a valiant knight who has delivered she-bear. Just like in the play that this episode parodies.
15a	15a	"Manufacturing Secret" "(Secret de fabrication)"	Victor Moulin	Josselin Charier; Fanny Marseau; Victor Moulin; Antoine Rodelet	Magali Garnier	May 29, 2017	N/A
Grizzy stands in front of the pantry, desperate. The stock of chocolate spread is completely depleted. He realises that the Lemmings are making some themselves, following a complicated recipe.
15b	15b	"Bling Bling Bear" "(Ours Bling-bling)"	Victor Moulin	Josselin Charier; Victor Moulin; Antoine Rodelet; Alexandre So	Isabelle Lemaux	May 30, 2017	N/A
By seeing a magazine with a jewellery ad showing a man offering a diamond to a woman, Grizzy imagines himself offering the ranger's engagement ring to she-bear. But the lemmings want to use it as a spinner.
15c	15c	"Intellectual Bear" "(Ours mc2)"	Victor Moulin	Josselin Charier; Victor Moulin; Antoine Rodelet	Joan Gouviac	May 31, 2017	N/A
Grizzy accidentally sticks a computer microprocessor to his temple and transforms into an exceptionally intelligent being capable of predicting events to come far in advance and manages to get rid of the Lemmings. But the Lemmings can top that too.
16a	16a	"Voodoo Blanket" "(Doudou Vaudou)"	Victor Moulin	Josselin Charier; Victor Moulin; Antoine Rodelet	Émilie Phuong	June 1, 2017	N/A
Tough luck, Grizzy is coming. Caught off guard, the Lemmings hide the jar of chocolate spread in a teddy bear-pyjama case to slip away without arousing suspicion. But after seeing teddy, he likes the teddy so much and takes the teddy away from them.
16b	16b	"Bear Prints" "(Fausse impression)"	Victor Moulin	Josselin Charier; Victor Moulin; Antoine Rodelet	Agathe Marmion	June 2, 2017	0.16
Grizzy discovers that he can print images taken with the camera as it's connected to a state-of-the-art printer. He decides to frame himself, but when the time comes to print his portrait, there's no more paper in the printer because he threw away all in the fire so that Lemmings could not make any paper airplane.
16c	16c	"Inspector Grizzy" "(Inspecteur Grizzy)"	Victor Moulin	Josselin Charier; Victor Moulin; Antoine Rodelet	Claire Dufresne	June 5, 2017	N/A
A van pulls up to the ranger's cabin to deliver a full crate of jars of chocolate spread. While Grizzy and the Lemmings fight over a wrecking bar to open it, someone steals the crate. Both of them start searching for who stole it.
17a	17a	"No Entrance!" "(Défense d'entrer)"	Clément Girard	Valérie Chappellet; Josselin Charier; Charles Vaucelle; Simon LeCocq; Antoine Rodelet	Magali Garnier	June 6, 2017	N/A
It's impossible to Grizzy to enter in cabin because the Lemmings have requisitioned the cabin for a party and barricaded themselves inside. After throwing them out, he accidentally touches the security button of cabin and a camera comes out which also throws him out. No one can enter the cabin except the owner of the house, who is the Forest Ranger.Then Grizzy and lemmings plans to get inside the home with Grizzy disguising as forest ranger.
17b	17b	"Lemmings Indigestion" "(Indigestion de lemmings)"	Victor Moulin	Josselin Charier; Victor Moulin; Antoine Rodelet; Alexandre So	Émilie Phuong	June 7, 2017	N/A
The Lemmings have some white beans which have very strange properties. When mixed with soda, anyone who eats them turns into a bouncing ball. Grizzy realises that if he wants to take a nap, he must get rid of the magic beans.
17c	17c	"Sonata in Bear Major" "(Sonate en ours majeur)"	Cédric Lachenaud	Simon LeCocq; Valérie Chappellet; Cédric Lachenaud; Antoine Rodelet; Josselin Charier	Isabelle Lemaux	June 8, 2017	N/A
Lemmings love using sonata to make a dissonant racket on a piano. Grizzy wants to get rid of the old piano but when he notices that she-bear likes the melody of Fur Elise, so he decides to learn the piece.
18a	18a	"Bear Fractions" "(Fractions d'ours)"	Victor Moulin	Josselin Charier; Cédric Lachenaud; Célestine Plays; Antoine Rodelet	Claire Dufresne	June 9, 2017	N/A
The Lemmings find a crate that fell off a Canadian army convoy transporting ultra-secret material. The case inside the crate emits a sort of laser beam that divides objects into multiple miniaturised versions of themselves.
18b	18b	"The Bear That Laid Golden Eggs" "(L'ours aux œufs d'or)"	Clément Girard	Josselin Charier; Victor Moulin; Antoine Rodelet	Magali Garnier	September 4, 2017	N/A
A machine hands out surprise eggs in exchange for a coin. Amongst the lots to be won, there is a super firework rocket the Lemmings dream of and there are also flowers that are made like a necklace that the Grizzy dreams of for she-bear.
18c	18c	"Crash Training Course" "(Formation minute)"	Victor Moulin	Josselin Charier; Victor Moulin; Antoine Rodelet	Isabelle Lemaux	September 4, 2017	N/A
Grizzy finds a high-tech gadget that enables him to learn anything within seconds, meaning that he can become the perfect bear. Lemmings also wants this gadget from Grizzy.
19a	19a	"As Far as Bear Can Remember" "(De mémoire d'ours)"	Victor Moulin	Josselin Charier; Victor Moulin; Antoine Rodelet; Alexandre So	Bruno Guerra	September 4, 2017	N/A
After the Yummy XL breaks under the train, Grizzy and the Lemmings find a box which is full of mini chocolate spreads and then they remember those days when they are in their childhoods, how they first meet, how they accidentally came first time in the Forest Ranger's cabin and during fighting this box miss from their hands. Note: This is the only episode in which the Forest Ranger is seen in flashback, but not fully clearly.
19b	19b	"Chemical Lemmings" "(Lemmings chimiques)"	Clément Girard	Valérie Chappellet; Josselin Charier; Clément Girard; Simon LeCocq; Antoine Rodelet	Agathe Marmion	September 5, 2017	N/A
The Lemmings start play chemistry novices with a fun experiment box at the cabin's garage which disturbs Grizzy. but he throws it in the lake who disturbs the Lemmings and makes them to turn purple and create mass destruction. Grizzy must make it stop somehow. Note: This is a parody of The Purple Smurfs from Smurfs and The Purple Minions from Despicable Me 2.
19c	19c	"Remote Control" "(Pilotage à distance)"	Cédric Lachenaud	Valérie Chappellet; Josselin Charier; Clément Girard; Simon LeCocq; Antoine Rodelet	Claire Dufresne	September 5, 2017	N/A
Grizzy's TV remote control is stolen by a partridge who collects high-tech objects in his nest perched high up in a tree; Grizzy has no other choice but to requisition the Lemmings' propulsion game to recover his possession.
20a	20a	"The Bear and the Butterfly" "(L'ours et le papillon)"	Clément Girard	Josselin Charier; Victor Moulin; Antoine Rodelet	Magali Garnier	September 6, 2017	N/A
Grizzy has got it into his head to offer a butterfly to the she-bear but the Lemmings fight with him over the rare specimens he is spotted. [This sentence is so grammatically cursed that I can't fix it.]
20b	20b	"Get Off My Tennis Shoes" "(Lâche-moi les baskets)"	Cédric Lachenaud	Josselin Charier; Victor Moulin; Antoine Rodelet	Claire Dufresne	September 6, 2017	N/A
The Lemmings have discovered an addictive new game based on the astonishingly bouncy properties of the running shoes. Grizzy also likes the shoes and tries to snatch it from them.
20c	20c	"Babysitting" "(Baby-sitting)"	Victor Moulin	Josselin Charier; Victor Moulin; Antoine Rodelet; Alexandre So	Bruno Guerra	September 7, 2017	N/A
She-bear asked Grizzy to babysit her she-bear cub for some time. There is no question of Grizzy tripping up, as he has no intention of taking any risks, but he hasn't reckoned on the Lemmings. Note: This is the only episode, in which She-bear's baby bear cub is shown.
21a	21a	"Bear Under Lock and Key" "(Ours à double tour)"	Cédric Lachenaud	Josselin Charier; Victor Moulin; Antoine Rodelet	Paul-Etienne Bourde-Cicé	September 7, 2017	N/A
Unwilling to share the food both he and the Lemmings are wild about, Grizzy locks it up inside the ranger's brand new and apparently burglar-proof safe.
21b	21b	"Lemming Blues" "(Le Lemmings blues)"	Cédric Lachenaud	Josselin Charier; Antoine Rodelet	Émilie Phuong	September 8, 2017	N/A
Grizzy is impressed by the TV show of a magician who transforms a partridge into a bouquet of flowers. To get rid of the Lemmings once and for all, for they exasperate him with their incessant games, Grizzy tries the magic trick on them. After throwing lemmings in a box it accidentally gets exchanged by a vehicle and a ball. Grizzy thinks that it was done by his magic and thinks he finally got rid of the lemmings. The box goes very far from cabin by train and when the lemmings finally come out of it, they decide to go to the cabin again. Grizzy starts remembering past days and the lemmings also as they both are very far from each other. Note:-In this episode, flashbacks from some previous episodes like "Bear's Best Friend", "Kung Fu Lemmings", "Thirst Quencher" etc. are shown.
21c	21c	"Snow Lemmings" "(Lemmings des neiges)"	Clément Girard	Valérie Chappellet; Josselin Charier; Charles Vaucelle; Simon LeCocq; Antoine Rodelet	Émilie Phuong	September 8, 2017	N/A
On a sweltering day, Grizzy's ice cream cravings turn cold when he realizes the Lemmings are playing with all of the chilly dessert.
22a	22a	"Augmented Bear" "(Ours augmenté)"	Cédric Lachenaud	Valérie Chappellet; Josselin Charier; Cédric Lachenaud; Simon LeCocq; Antoine Rodelet	Émilie Phuong	September 29, 2017	N/A
From lemmings, Grizzy brought a tablet that had a game of catching fishes.
22b	22b	"Lemmings Under Pressure" "(Lemmings sous pression)"	Cédric Lachenaud	Josselin Charier; Victor Moulin; Antoine Rodelet	Agathe Marmion	September 29, 2017	N/A
Grizzy wants to melt the ice in which is a salmon with the blow dryer. but the Lemmings are already using the dryer for their latest rocket game in the piping system.
22c	22c	"Lemmings in Space" "(Lemmings en orbite)"	Victor Moulin	Josselin Charier; Victor Moulin; Antoine Rodelet	Isabelle Lemaux	October 6, 2017	N/A
Due to crackers, the forest ranger cabin accidentally comes in space with Grizzy and the Lemmings. Grizzy wants to come back on earth but the Lemmings does not.
23a	23a	"Sniffer Racoon" "(Raton renifleur)"	Cédric Lachenaud	Valérie Chappellet; Josselin Charier; Charles Vaucelle; Simon LeCocq; Antoine Rodelet	Paul-Etienne Bourde-Cicé	October 6, 2017	N/A
After lemmings snatch the Yummy XL from Grizzy, he finds them with the help of a Raccoon.
23b	23b	"Transformational Bear" "(Transformours)"	Clément Girard	Valérie Chappellet; Josselin Charier; Charles Vaucelle; Simon LeCocq; Antoine Rodelet	Agathe Marmion	October 13, 2017	N/A
Grizzy has a pain in his body. He brought a toy, which can make itself into a car or a robot. The lemmings want both.
23c	23c	"Shaken-Up Bear" "(Ours secoué)"	Cédric Lachenaud	Josselin Charier; Victor Moulin; Antoine Rodelet	Agathe Marmion	October 13, 2017	N/A
The Lemmings discover a new game of shaking. The vibrations created by Grizzy's snoring during his nap give the Lemmings an idea for a bouncing game. But when Grizzy changes positions and his snoring stops, the Lemmings must find other sources of vibrations, which disturbs Grizzy to sleep.
24a	24a	"Piñata Party"	Alexandre Wahl	Valérie Chappellet; Josselin Charier; Charles Vaucelle; Simon LeCocq; Antoine Rodelet	Joan Gouviac	October 20, 2017	N/A
Grizzy finds a birthday piñata in the ranger's living room. He wants to destroy it for toffees. The Lemmings, who prefer to use it as a toy to swing from, are determined to stop Grizzy from destroying the piñata.
24b	24b	"Bear Game" "(Jeu de l'ours)"	Cédric Lachenaud	Josselin Charier; Sébastien Guérout; Cédric Lachenaud; Antoine Rodelet; Alexandre Wahl	Magali Garnier	October 20, 2017	N/A
As usual, during fighting to get Yummy XL, the jar of chocolate falls in a magical object. Both of them would play a game similar to ludo to getting the jar.
24c	24c	"Ranger Lemming" "(Ranger Lemming)"	Cédric Lachenaud	Valérie Chappellet; Josselin Charier; Charles Vaucelle; Simon LeCocq; Antoine Rodelet	Magali Garnier	October 27, 2017	N/A
Grizzy is bothered by an object stuck in between the sofa cushions. It's a big furry lemming puppet glove and the Lemmings believe that the puppet is a Super Lemming who's stronger than Grizzy and begin to obey it.
25a	25a	"Halloween Bear" "(Ours d'Halloween)"	Alexandre Wahl	Valérie Chappellet; Josselin Charier; Simon LeCocq; Antoine Rodelet; Alexandre So	Émilie Phuong	October 27, 2017	N/A
It is Halloween and Grizzy sees that the Ranger's house is full of pumpkin, fake spiders, webs etc. Lemmings started fun in cabin. After seeing the marshmallows, they both start fighting to get them.
25b	25b	"Clean Bear" "(Ours propre)"	Alexandre Wahl	Valérie Chappellet; Josselin Charier; Charles Vaucelle; Simon LeCocq; Antoine Rodelet	Isabelle Lemaux	November 3, 2017	N/A
Grizzy wants to clean himself and give a ring to she bear but he doesn't have a soap for cleaning his body, on which lemmings are skating on.
25c	25c	"Wandering Spirits" "(Esprits vagabonds)"	Victor Moulin	Josselin Charier; Victor Moulin; Antoine Rodelet; Alexandre Wahl	Claire Dufresne	November 3, 2017	N/A
Grizzy found a magical object that changes his spirit to moose or any other animal. When lemmings see this magic, they try to change their spirits to partridge so that they can fly in the sky.
26a	26a	"Mirror, Mirror on the Wall" "(Miroir, mon beau miroir)"	Cédric Lachenaud	Valérie Chappellet; Josselin Charier; Clément Girard; Simon LeCocq; Antoine Rodelet	Bruno Guerra	November 10, 2017	N/A
In the forest during fishing in the river, instead of fish, Grizzy found a box in which a magical mirror is placed. That has a power in which when someone sees into the mirror, his dreams become true in mirror.
26b	26b	"Grizzy the Wizard" "(Grizzy l'enchanteur)"	Victor Moulin	Josselin Charier; Victor Moulin; Antoine Rodelet	Claire Dufresne	November 10, 2017	N/A
Fallen by a vehicle, lemmings find a magical stick which has a power to make any non-living thing into living thing.
26c	26c	"Moonwalk Bear" "(Ours mal luné)"	Victor Moulin	Josselin Charier; Victor Moulin; Antoine Rodelet	Isabelle Lemaux	November 17, 2017	N/A
Both Grizzy and the Lemmings accidentally travel to the Moon by crackers. Grizzy wants to come back on Earth while the lemmings start having fun.

=== Season 2 (2018–19) ===
No. overall	No. in season	Title	Directed by	Written by	Storyboard by	Original release date	France viewers (millions)
27a	1a	"Camping in the Wild" "(Camping sauvage)"	Alexandre Wahl	Josselin Charier; Cédric Lachenaud; Antoine Rodelet; Alexandre Wahl	Thomas Buron	September 2, 2018	N/A
After Grizzy ejects the Lemmings from the couch, a large chain of events happens, causing a partridge to blow up the house. After this, the two battle over a sleeping bag as if it were a couch; Grizzy wants to use it normally, while the Lemmings want to use it to jump on it.
27b	1b	"Ice & Bears" "(De la glace et des ours)"	Cédric Lachenaud	Josselin Charier; Cédric Lachenaud; Antoine Rodelet; Alexandre Wahl	Thomas Buron	September 2, 2018	N/A
The Lemmings race around with a polar bear and keep it cold by using a large quantity of ice. However, this doesn't please Grizzy that much.
27c	1c	"Carried Away Bear" "(Ours embarqué)"	Cédric Lachenaud	Josselin Charier; Victor Moulin; Antoine Rodelet	Agathe Marmion	September 2, 2018	N/A
Grizzy and the Lemmings use drones against each other to get their beloved chocolate spread. However, they realize that as long as the drone antenna lands on something, they can control that thing.
28a	2a	"Fountain of Bear Youth" "(Ours de jouvence)"	Victor Moulin	Josselin Charier; Victor Moulin; Antoine Rodelet	Marion Charve	September 2, 2018	N/A
A special potion turns Grizzy back into a bear cub for a short time. Once the magic wears off, Grizzy plots his revenge.
28b	2b	"Lemmings Kit" "(Lemmings à bloc)"	Cédric Lachenaud	Josselin Charier; Sébastien Guérout; Cédric Lachenaud; Antoine Rodelet; Alexandre Wahl	Marion Charve	September 2, 2018	N/A
Grizzy, in order to stop the Lemmings from taking the chocolate spread, locks the cabinet and throws away all the destructive supplies. However, Grizzy doesn't account for the Lemmings using Lego-themed tools to gain their dessert.
28c	2c	"Timeless Bear" "(Ours intemporel)"	Victor Moulin	Josselin Charier; Victor Moulin; Antoine Rodelet	Idriss Benseghir	September 2, 2018	N/A
After Grizzy fell in the underground beneath the cabin due to lemmings, Grizzy found a magical stick which takes both of them in an unknown (presumably prehistoric) place, where they met dinosaurs, a big butterfly, a dragon chicken, etc.
29a	3a	"Irresistible Bear" "(Ours irrésistible)"	Cédric Lachenaud	Valérie Chappellet; Josselin Charier; Clément Girard; Simon LeCocq; Antoine Rodelet	Idriss Benseghir	September 9, 2018	N/A
Due to the crashing of the Lemmings, Grizzy found a pink-coloured liquid in the middle of rocks that if someone drinks it, they will fall in love with anyone who is standing in front of them. Grizzy wants to drink this to She-bear. Meanwhile, the Lemmings want to give it to a Moose. In the end, the Lemmings crash into a billboard along with Grizzy accidentally making the love potion tip over that leads all of them to drink it and fell in love with each other and leaning in for a kiss.
29b	3b	"Yummy Fly" "(Mouche à Yummy)"	Cédric Lachenaud	Valérie Chappellet; Josselin Charier; Clément Girard; Simon LeCocq; Antoine Rodelet	Marion Charve	September 9, 2018	N/A
A pesky fly teams up with the Lemmings to cause a commotion and distract Grizzy enough to grab his chocolate jar.
29c	3c	"Call of the Bear" "(L'appel de l'ours)"	Cédric Lachenaud	Josselin Charier; Cédric Lachenaud; Antoine Rodelet; Alexandre Wahl	Agathe Marmion	September 9, 2018	N/A
Grizzy and the Lemmings found a lot of the whistles in a box in the cabin that attracts other living organisms to follow the command of whom is whistling. Both of them want to attract the flock of partridges.
30a	4a	"Weightless Bear" "(Ours sans gravité)"	Victor Moulin	Josselin Charier; Victor Moulin; Antoine Rodelet	Laura Pannetier	September 9, 2018	N/A
Grizzy and the Lemmings accidentally set off a chain reaction which sends Yummy XL, Salmon, and truck flying into space, where it damages a space station and a scientific machine falls in front of cabin with broken parts of station.
30b	4b	"Hat Tricks" "(Coups de chapeau)"	Cédric Lachenaud	Valérie Chappellet; Josselin Charier; Clément Girard; Simon LeCocq; Antoine Rodelet	Ida Pulicani	September 9, 2018	N/A
Grizzy found a magical hat in the house where if something is thrown in the hat, it comes out with the help of a stick. Grizzy throws a flower in the hat to trying to impress she-bear, while the Lemmings also want the hat that they plan for themselves to go into the hat and come out with magic.
30c	4c	"No See, No Do" "(Pas vu pas pris)"	Victor Moulin	Josselin Charier; Victor Moulin; Antoine Rodelet; Alexandre So	Claire Dufresne	September 9, 2018	N/A
Once again the main characters do not want to share Yummy XL. While washing his hands, Grizzy accidentally discovers a chemical solution that make ssomebody invisible.
31a	5a	"Good Bear, Bad Bear" "(Vil ours, bon ours)"	Victor Moulin	Josselin Charier; Victor Moulin; Antoine Rodelet	Ida Pulicani	September 16, 2018	N/A
During fighting for the chocolate spread, a magical hammer separates the good nature and bad nature of Grizzy and he becomes into two Grizzys. one is good Grizzy while the other is bad Grizzy. Good bear makes chocolate spread for the Lemmings while bad bear tries to get for his own.
31b	5b	"High-Risk Driving" "(Conduite à risque)"	Corentin LeCourt	Josselin Charier; Corentin LeCourt; Victor Moulin; Antoine Rodelet	Agathe Marmion	September 16, 2018	N/A
After studying a magazine advertisement with a couple standing in front of an SUV, Grizzy imagines that if he had a nice car, she-bear would be interested in him. He decides to buy a temporary car from the lemmings.
31c	5c	"Bear Predictions" "(Prédictions d'ours)"	Cédric Lachenaud	Josselin Charier; Victor Moulin; Antoine Rodelet	Claire Dufresne	September 16, 2018	N/A
While chasing the Lemmings who stole his jar of chocolate spread, Grizzy crashes into an arcade cabinet near the supermarket which displays a model fortune teller and her crystal ball.
32a	6a	"Lemming Beach" "(Lemming de plage)"	Corentin LeCourt	Josselin Charier; Cédric Lachenaud; Corentin LeCourt; Célestine Jacquel-Plays; Antoine Rodelet	Claire Dufresne	September 16, 2018	N/A
A newly unpacked UV tanning booth holds the place of honor in the middle of the cabin; Grizzy gets it into his head so a classy tan will help him draw the attention of the she-bear.
32b	6b	"Of Fur and Swords" "(De fourrure et d'épée)"	Corentin LeCourt	Josselin Charier; Corentin LeCourt; Victor Moulin; Antoine Rodelet	Laura Pannetier	September 16, 2018	N/A
The Lemmings have turned the entire cabin topsy-turvy to organize medieval jousts with the ranger's fencing gear; Grizzy, who wishes to recover his couch from the lemmings, tries to straighten up, but is driven out by their fencing foils.
32c	6c	"Lemmings Board" "(Planche à Lemmings)"	Alexandre Wahl	Josselin Charier; Sébastien Guérout; Cédric Lachenaud; Antoine Rodelet; Alexandre Wahl	Agathe Marmion	September 16, 2018	N/A
From Ranger's mini computer, Grizzy accidentally orders a hover-board; it's the latest generation skateboard that levitates above the ground without wheels.
33a	7a	"Animal Pics" "(Photographes animaliers)"	Victor Moulin	Josselin Charier; Victor Moulin; Antoine Rodelet	Idriss Benseghir	September 23, 2018	N/A
Grizzy found a camera in the Ranger's house and he wants to go to she-bear to click her photo and impress her but the lemmings also want the camera to take their group photo.
33b	7b	"Bear Diet" "(Régime d'ours)"	Corentin LeCourt	Josselin Charier; Cédric Lachenaud; Corentin LeCourt; Célestine Jacquel-Plays; Antoine Rodelet	Laura Pannetier	September 23, 2018	N/A
The fridge in the cabin has been replaced by a brand new state-of-the-art appliance which analyzes the body fat percentage of whoever wants to serve himself, before selecting the appropriate foodstuffs.
33c	7c	"Balloon Bear" "(Gonflage d'ours)"	Cédric Lachenaud	Josselin Charier; Cédric Lachenaud; Antoine Rodelet; Alexandre Wahl	Laura Pannetier	September 23, 2018	N/A
Grizzy watches a demonstration of balloon modeling on TV; he decides to make a balloon poodle to offer the she-bear.
34a	8a	"Bear Pillow" "(Ours molletonné)"	Cédric Lachenaud	Valérie Chappellet; Josselin Charier; Simon LeCocq; Victor Moulin; Antoine Rodelet	Agathe Marmion	September 23, 2018	N/A
Grizzy and the Lemmings fight over a pillow for sleep.
34b	8b	"Hooks and Loops Bear" "(Ours à scratch)"	Corentin LeCourt	Josselin Charier; Victor Moulin; Antoine Rodelet	Agathe Marmion	September 23, 2018	N/A
Grizzy is awakened from his nap by the unpleasant, ongoing sound of Velcro strips being ripped off; the Lemmings have covered their bodies in Velcro and are throwing themselves against a doormat, which serves as their target.
34c	8c	"Fast Workout" "(Muscu express)"	Victor Moulin	Josselin Charier; Victor Moulin; Antoine Rodelet	Ida Pulicani	September 23, 2018	N/A
The she-bear is sad to have lost her favorite flower in an inaccessible spot under a giant boulder; Grizzy tries to lift it but can't, so he starts an intensive bodybuilding routine.
35a	9a	"BatGrizzy" "(Bat-Grizzy)"	Victor Moulin	Josselin Charier; Victor Moulin; Antoine Rodelet	Marion Charve	September 30, 2018	N/A
The Lemmings try to catch a bat to play rodeo, disturbing Grizzy as he plays a game on the ranger's mobile. Note:- The episode title and episode are a pun on and a parody of Batman.
35b	9b	"Moveable Apps" "(Applis très mobiles)"	Victor Moulin	Josselin Charier; Victor Moulin; Antoine Rodelet	Clément Girard	September 30, 2018	N/A
The Lemmings have a blast testing every app on a tablet one by one; Grizzy uses the GPS to find the nearest spread godown.
35c	9c	"Wild Modeling" "(Duplicata sauvage)"	Victor Moulin	Josselin Charier; Victor Moulin; Antoine Rodelet	Idriss Benseghir	September 30, 2018	N/A
Grizzy sees that the Lemmings make a fake model of their bodies with a scientific 3d-printing machine. He also wants to make a model of himself.
36a	10a	"The Bear Next Door" "(Mon voisin l'Ours)"	Cédric Lachenaud	Josselin Charier; Cédric Lachenaud; Célestine Jacquel-Plays; Antoine Rodelet	Agathe Marmion	September 30, 2018	N/A
From a train, Grizzy and the lemmings found a magical object that took them into other unknown worlds. Specifically an alternate dimension where the ranger's cabin is a chocolate museum.
36b	10b	"Wild Zapping" "(Zapping sauvage)"	Corentin LeCourt	Josselin Charier; Victor Moulin; Antoine Rodelet	Bruno Guerra; Fanny Marseau	September 30, 2018	N/A
The Lemmings wantsto see a cat and mouse TV show but Grizzy comes and throws them out before changing the channel to his favourite "secret of the salmon" TV show. So the lemmings retaliate and they start fighting for the remote.
36c	10c	"Warning: Unlimited Lemmings" "(Danger : Lemmings sans limites)"	Célestine Jacquel-Plays	Josselin Charier; Célestine Jacquel-Plays; Cédric Lachenaud; Antoine Rodelet	Ida Pulicani	September 30, 2018	N/A
Grizzy wants to give a surprise date for she-bear in the cabin, but due to lemmings, he repeatedly fails because the vehicles keep running fastly due to sign of board.
37a	11a	"Bouncing Bear" "(Ours à rebonds)"	Cédric Lachenaud	Valérie Chappellet; Josselin Charier; Clément Girard; Simon LeCocq; Antoine Rodelet	Claire Dufresne	October 14, 2018	N/A
Grizzy's nap is disturbed, because lemmings started jumping on trampoline which is their new game. When he tries to stop him, he accidentally impresses She-bear by jumping himself on trampoline. Then he snatches it from lemmings and starts practice on it for more skilled jumping.
37b	11b	"Masked Racoon" "(Raton masqué)"	Alexandre Wahl	Josselin Charier; Victor Moulin; Antoine Rodelet	Laura Pannetier	October 14, 2018	N/A
The Lemmings started playing a new game with a raccoon. This is thanks to biscuits. Grizzy sets a trap for them. The Lemmings and their raccoon crash into a plane, and a mask carried by the plane gets stuck in the raccoon's face and gets superpowers, but Grizzy wants the mask for superpowers as well…
37c	11c	"Spinning Lemmings (1)" "(Lemmings révolutions)"	Corentin LeCourt	Josselin Charier; Cédric Lachenaud; Corentin LeCourt; Antoine Rodelet	Clément Girard	October 14, 2018	N/A
Grizzy found a Fidget spinner in the cabin; the Lemmings also wants to play with it. Note: This is the first of two episodes that share the same title of "Spinning Lemmings".
38a	12a	"Game Madness" "(Folie du jeu)"	Victor Moulin	Josselin Charier; Victor Moulin; Antoine Rodelet	Marion Charve	October 14, 2018	N/A
Grizzy and the Lemmings started playing a game with their fake mini toys which look like them.
38b	12b	"Household Avatar" "(Avatar de compagnie)"	Idriss Benseghir	Idriss Benseghir; Josselin Charier; Victor Moulin; Antoine Rodelet	Marion Charve	October 14, 2018	N/A
Grizzy finds a tablet in the cabin with a game similar to the Talking Tom mobile games. However, the lemmings also want to play with the game and repeatedly bother Grizzy's avatar.
38c	12c	"Beastly Genie" "(Génie animal)"	Victor Moulin	Josselin Charier; Victor Moulin; Antoine Rodelet	Idriss Benseghir	October 14, 2018	N/A
In the underground of cabin, Grizzy found a magical lamp and when he opens it, a genie who looks like Grizzy comes out and makes all of Grizzy's wishes true. Lemmings stole the lamp and when they open it a genie, who is look like a lemming came out and make the wishes true of lemmings.
39a	13a	"Make Peace Not War" "(Personnalités contrariées)"	Cédric Lachenaud	Josselin Charier; Célestine Jacquel-Plays; Victor Moulin; Antoine Rodelet	Marion Charve	October 21, 2018	N/A
From a helicopter, the Lemmings found a magical object that makes someone peaceful.
39b	13b	"Disguised Reality" "(Réalité déguisée)"	Corentin LeCourt	Josselin Charier; Corentin LeCourt; Victor Moulin; Antoine Rodelet	Idriss Benseghir	October 21, 2018	N/A
Lemmings have a tablet that can make someone's face into another in it.
39c	13c	"Folds and Folds Again" "(Plis et replis)"	Corentin LeCourt	Josselin Charier; Cédric Lachenaud; Corentin LeCourt; Antoine Rodelet	Agathe Marmion	October 21, 2018	N/A
Grizzy wants to make a butterfly of paper for she-bear while lemmings wants to make something of paper that they can play.
40a	14a	"Cartoon Bear" "(Ours en cartoon)"	Victor Moulin	Josselin Charier; Victor Moulin; Antoine Rodelet	Clément Girard	December 30, 2018	N/A
Grizzy move out the batteries of TV remote, so the Lemmings cannot watch TV, but they connect the TV with a car battery which makes full world like an animation cartoon.
40b	14b	"XXL Bear" "(Ours XXL)"	Victor Moulin	Josselin Charier; Victor Moulin; Antoine Rodelet	Laura Pannetier	January 3, 2019	N/A
Once again, Grizzy shows the Lemmings they just don't measure up to him physically, and the last jar of chocolate spread is for the strongest.
40c	14c	"Never Judge a Bear by its Cover" "(L'habit ne fait pas l'ours)"	Idriss Benseghir	Josselin Charier; Victor Moulin; Antoine Rodelet	Ida Pulicani	December 31, 2018	N/A
A vehicle comes in front of cabin and leaves a crate of chocolate spread. The Lemmings lay their hands it and hide it somewhere behind Grizzy's back.
41a	15a	"Bear Glasses" "(Ours à lunettes)"	Cédric Lachenaud	Josselin Charier; Victor Moulin; Antoine Rodelet	Ida Pulicani	December 31, 2018	N/A
Grizzy is persuaded to find an ultimate gadget, that is a glasses for good living, which lemmings wants to snatch from him.
41b	15b	"Bear Under Close Protection" "(Ours sous haute protection)"	Alexandre Wahl	Josselin Charier; Victor Moulin; Antoine Rodelet	Laura Pannetier	January 1, 2019	N/A
The Lemmings clamour for their turn to play with the mobile phone, but Grizzy is not in the sharing mood.
41c	15c	"Zero Visibility" "(Manque de visibilité)"	Idriss Benseghir	Josselin Charier; Victor Moulin; Antoine Rodelet	Agathe Marmion	January 1, 2019	N/A
Grizzy is captivated by a mime artist on TV who makes viewers believe in the presence of an invisible wall; to get rid of the Lemmings who have their sights set on the jar of Yummy XL chocolate spread, Grizzy hides it and pretends it's invisible. After making them fools, Lemmings also tried a fake magic incidence and snatch the Yummy XL. During fighting, Grizzy accidentally falls underground hill and found a magical leaf that could make anything real but invisible.
42a	16a	"Intensive Care" "(Soins intensifs)"	Corentin LeCourt	Josselin Charier; Cédric Lachenaud; Corentin LeCourt; Antoine Rodelet	Clément Girard	January 2, 2019	N/A
The Lemmings shiver with cold, sneeze and are glassy-eyed: they have a big fat cold. Grizzy felt pity for them and tried to keep them well.
42b	16b	"Lemming Gum" "(Lemming gum)"	Cédric Lachenaud	Josselin Charier; Victor Moulin; Antoine Rodelet	Marion Charve	January 2, 2019	N/A
The Lemmings find a pack of icy mints that literally chill your breath. One blast from anyone who eats them freezes everything in sight. It disturbs Grizzy once again also.
42c	16c	"Lemming Juice" "(Lemmings pressés)"	Idriss Benseghir	Josselin Charier; Victor Moulin; Antoine Rodelet	Agathe Marmion	January 3, 2019	N/A
Grizzy can't believe it: he has just swallowed a spoonful of his favourite food, chocolate spread, and he hates it because the lemmings replaced it with a chilly jar.
43a	17a	"Zen Bear" "(Ours zen)"	Corentin LeCourt	Josselin Charier; Cédric Lachenaud; Corentin LeCourt; Antoine Rodelet	Claire Dufresne	January 4, 2019	N/A
Grizzy sees the fondness of she-bear for meditation. To seduce her, he sets out to prove he too can attain the Zen attitude.
43b	17b	"Ctrl+Alt+Bear" "(Ctrl+Alt+Ours)"	Célestine Jacquel-Plays	Idriss Benseghir; Josselin Charier; Célestine Jacquel-Plays; Cédric Lachenaud; Antoine Rodelet	Laura Pannetier	January 4, 2019	N/A
Grizzy and the Lemmings finds a super-secret Canadian Army prototype that resembles a simple computer keyboard.
43c	17c	"Lemming Bowling" "(Lemming bowling)"	Idriss Benseghir	Josselin Charier; Célestine Jacquel-Plays; Cédric Lachenaud; Antoine Rodelet	Claire Dufresne	January 5, 2019	N/A
The Lemmings are having a blast with a bowling game they found in the cabin's storeroom.
44a	18a	"Mushroom Hunt" "(Chasse aux champignons)"	Célestine Jacquel-Plays	Josselin Charier; Célestine Jacquel-Plays; Cédric Lachenaud; Antoine Rodelet	Claire Dufresne	January 5, 2019	N/A
After the rain, to the great delight of the Lemmings, strange bouncing mushrooms sprout in the yard.
44b	18b	"Flying Bear" "(Ours en l'air)"	Idriss Benseghir	Idriss Benseghir; Josselin Charier; Corentin LeCourt; Antoine Rodelet	Clément Girard	May 7, 2019	N/A
From fallen by a vehicle, Lemmings find magical objects who look like magnets that can turn anything into a flying object.
44c	18c	"Big Top Bear" "(Ours en piste)"	Cédric Lachenaud	Josselin Charier; Victor Moulin; Antoine Rodelet	Ida Pulicani	May 7, 2019	N/A
With a lion-tamer's whip, a sugar bowl and much work, the Lemmings have successfully trained a caribou to go through their obstacle course.
45a	19a	"Electro Ranger Lemming"	Célestine Jacquel-Plays	Josselin Charier; Célestine Jacquel-Plays; Cédric Lachenaud; Antoine Rodelet	Marion Charve	May 8, 2019	N/A
Grizzy happens onto the electronic version of the Ranger Lemming toy which is capable of reproducing the movements one teaches it, like a smart robot.
45b	19b	"Bear Repellent" "(Ours répulsif)"	Corentin LeCourt	Josselin Charier; Corentin LeCourt; Antoine Rodelet	Marion Charve	May 8, 2019	N/A
The cabin is equipped with an ultra-effective pest detector capable of sensing the presence of an intruder.
45c	19c	"Bear Behind the Wheel" "(Ours du volant)"	Victor Moulin	Josselin Charier; Victor Moulin; Antoine Rodelet	Ida Pulicani	May 9, 2019	N/A
Grizzy and the Lemmings decided to race between two of them and see who will win, however when they are starting the race both of them shocked to see that she-bear, a moose and a raccoon also comes for race with their own vehicles.
46a	20a	"Rolling Cabin" "(Cabane à bascule)"	Victor Moulin	Josselin Charier; Célestine Jacquel-Plays; Cédric Lachenaud; Victor Moulin; Antoine Rodelet	Clément Girard	May 9, 2019	N/A
When Grizzy throws out lemmings from the sofa, they placed giant remote-controlled hydraulic jacks under the cabin to transform it into a life-sized rolling ball game.
46b	20b	"Lemmings Plant" "(Plante à Lemmings)"	Alexandre Wahl	Valérie Chappellet; Josselin Charier; Clément Girard; Simon LeCocq; Antoine Rodelet	Agathe Marmion	May 10, 2019	N/A
Grizzy is disturbed during his nap by the flies which buzz incessantly around his head; he saw that Lemmings are playing upon a carnivorous plant that can eat flying insects.
46c	20c	"Target Bear" "(Ours ciblé)"	Idriss Benseghir	Josselin Charier; Victor Moulin; Antoine Rodelet	Claire Dufresne	May 13, 2019	N/A
After unearthing a crate of competition boomerangs, the Lemmings rapidly become pros capable of disarming Grizzy at a distance and ejecting him from the cabin with disconcerting ease.
47a	21a	"Northern Lights" "(Ours boréal)"	Célestine Jacquel-Plays	Josselin Charier; Célestine Jacquel-Plays; Cédric Lachenaud; Antoine Rodelet	Laura Pannetier	May 13, 2019	.357
Exasperated by the Lemmings who prevent him from watching his favourite TV show in peace, Grizzy catapults them out of the cabin.
47b	21b	"Tick Tock Bear" "(Tic tac d'ours)"	Célestine Jacquel-Plays	Josselin Charier; Célestine Jacquel-Plays; Cédric Lachenaud; Antoine Rodelet	Marion Charve	May 14, 2019	N/A
In this tick tock episode, Grizzy see a strange wall clock in the cabin. It resembles a Swiss cuckoo.
47c	21c	"Dreams on Command" "(Rêves sur commandes)"	Cédric Lachenaud	Josselin Charier; Victor Moulin; Antoine Rodelet	Clément Girard	May 14, 2019	N/A
Awakened by a nightmare filled with Lemmings, a moose, and the she bear, Grizzy stumbles on a scientific dream machine.
48a	22a	"Elementary Lemmings" "(Lemmings élémentaires)"	Cédric Lachenaud	Josselin Charier; Célestine Jacquel-Plays; Cédric Lachenaud; Antoine Rodelet	Laura Pannetier	May 15, 2019	N/A
Grizzy finds a magical wind medallion in the cabin, which has a power to give someone of air, rocks, fire and cool.
48b	22b	"Bear Sitter" "(Nounou d'ours)"	Idriss Benseghir	Idriss Benseghir; Josselin Charier; Corentin LeCourt; Antoine Rodelet	Laura Pannetier	May 15, 2019	N/A
Once again fighting for TV and remote of Grizzy and the Lemmings. Grizzy wants to watch TV show of Salmon fishes while lemmings wants to watch TV show of Cat and Mouse.
48c	22c	"Rainbow Moose" "(Élan arc-en-ciel)"	Corentin LeCourt	Idriss Benseghir; Josselin Charier; Clément Girard; Corentin LeCourt; Antoine Rodelet	Marion Charve	May 16, 2019	N/A
A magic horn lands on the muzzle of a moose, endowing it with grace and the ability to fly. Grizzy decided to catch him for impressing she bear while the Lemmings wants to play on it.
49a	23a	"Radar Bear" "(Ours au radar)"	Célestine Jacquel-Plays	Célestine Jacquel-Plays; Cédric Lachenaud; Victor Moulin	Ida Pulicani	May 16, 2019	N/A
While looking for the TV remote-control device, Grizzy found or happens onto a box in cabin, that can locate keys.
49b	23b	"Zorbing Lemmings" "(Effet boule de Lemmings)"	Idriss Benseghir	Josselin Charier; Victor Moulin; Antoine Rodelet	Agathe Marmion	May 17, 2019	N/A
The Lemmings have turned the cabin topsy-turvy and created an obstacle course.
49c	23c	"Air Trafficking" "(Traficotage aérien)"	Cédric Lachenaud	Josselin Charier; Victor Moulin; Antoine Rodelet	Ida Pulicani	May 17, 2019	N/A
The Lemmings create a customised hang-glider using a supermarket shopping cart. Grizzy decided to snatch it to impressing the she bear.
50a	24a	"A Lemmings Fairy Tale" "(Un conte de Lemmings)"	Corentin LeCourt	Idriss Benseghir; Josselin Charier; Corentin LeCourt; Antoine Rodelet	Claire Dufresne	May 20, 2019	N/A
Due to a struck on head and see the fairy story book pictures, the Lemmings believe they are the dwarves from the tale Snow White, and start attacking the cabin with pickaxes. After that Grizzy also believes he is snow white due to same incidence.
50b	24b	"Slam Dunk Lemmings"	Cédric Lachenaud	Josselin Charier; Célestine Jacquel-Plays; Cédric Lachenaud; Antoine Rodelet	Agathe Marmion	May 20, 2019	N/A
The favourite chocolate spread brand (Yummy XL) of Grizzy and the Lemmings seems to be organising a big competition where the prize is a giant jar of the spread. Note: This episode reuses footage from "Random Bear".
50c	24c	"Uncouth Bear" "(Ours mal léché)"	Idriss Benseghir	Josselin Charier; Célestine Jacquel-Plays; Cédric Lachenaud; Antoine Rodelet	Agathe Marmion	May 21, 2019	N/A
After being frozen for millions of years, a saber-toothed bear bursts into the cabin looking for food which disturbing Grizzy.
51a	25a	"Passing Through Walls" "(Ours traversant)"	Célestine Jacquel-Plays	Idriss Benseghir; Josselin Charier; Corentin LeCourt; Antoine Rodelet	Marion Charve	May 21, 2019	N/A
The Lemmings discover a top-secret Canadian Army prototype that allows someone to pass through solid surfaces for a window of several seconds.
51b	25b	"Eagle Spirit" "(L'esprit de l'aigle)"	Corentin LeCourt	Idriss Benseghir; Josselin Charier; Corentin LeCourt; Antoine Rodelet	Laura Pannetier	May 22, 2019	N/A
The Lemmings find an Amerindian eagle amulet, that offers the powers of a bird of prey.
51c	25c	"Rock 'N' Lemmings"	Cédric Lachenaud	Idriss Benseghir; Josselin Charier; Victor Moulin; Antoine Rodelet	Bruno Guerra	May 22, 2019	N/A
The Lemmings are having a blast with the electric guitar and the cabin walls tremble with their experimental rock.
52a	26a	"Hulking Lemmings" "(Lemmings mastoc)"	Idriss Benseghir	Josselin Charier; Célestine Jacquel-Plays; Cédric Lachenaud; Antoine Rodelet	Agathe Marmion	May 23, 2019	N/A
To finally be on an equal footing with Grizzy's imposing build and throw their own weight around in the cabin, the Lemmings decide to wear a blowup sumotori costume.
52b	26b	"Ancestral Bear" "(Ours ancestral)"	Cédric Lachenaud	Josselin Charier; Célestine Jacquel-Plays; Cédric Lachenaud; Antoine Rodelet	Claire Dufresne	May 23, 2019	N/A
Grizzy and the Lemmings find an ancient table in a cave that shows past events.
52c	26c	"Hocus Pocus Lemmingus" "(Hocus pocus lemmingus)"	Célestine Jacquel-Plays	Josselin Charier; Célestine Jacquel-Plays; Cédric Lachenaud; Antoine Rodelet	Claire Dufresne	May 24, 2019	N/A
The Lemmings discover an old book of magic spells with a formula that enables one to take on the appearance of any other creature.

=== Season 3 (2021–22) ===
In this season, Grizzy and the Lemmings, along with the ranger's cabin, go around the world continuing their conflicts, after in the intro, a jar of Yummy that Grizzy and the Lemmings were fighting over hit a harpoon, which grabbed on a plane, pulling the cabin off the ground taking the bear and the rodents with them. This season, alongside the fourth, is dubbed World Tour. Season 3 takes Grizzy and the Lemmings to the Great Wall of China; a tropical island in the Pacific Ocean; snowy Antarctica; the African desert; the highlands of Scotland; and a rainforest jungle respectively.

No. overall	No. in season	Title	Directed by	Written by	Storyboard by	Original release date	France viewers (millions)
53a	1a	"Lemming Fortune" "(Fortune Lemming)"	Idriss Benseghir	Idriss Benseghir; Josselin Charier; Victor Moulin; Antoine Rodelet	Agathe Marmion	September 21, 2021	N/A
When Grizzy propels the Lemmings out of the log cabin perched on the Great Wall of China, the critters land on a small traditional house in a bamboo forest where they discover a box filled with fortune cookies. One Lemming gets super lucky after eating one. Armed with their magic cookies, the Lemmings set out to confront Grizzy. But each cookie represents a power… or a curse!
53b	1b	"Tough Medicine" "(Médecine pas douce)"	Victor Moulin	Josselin Charier; Célestine Jacquel-Plays; Victor Moulin; Antoine Rodelet	Agathe Marmion	September 22, 2021	N/A
The Lemmings love sesame nougat but Grizzy, who adores this treat too, steals their box. Quite upset, the rodents search for more, in vain. Instead, they discover the art of energy points in an old Chinese medicine book. Determined to recover their sweets regardless of the cost, the Lemmings activate Grizzy's vital points, and the bear finds himself completely blocked. Thanks to the book, Grizzy frees himself and learns to master energies in turn. During a chase, the lemmings disable Grizzy's arms, and then his tongue when he tries to free himself with it. A panda falls on the bear and the rodents, with stones hitting the panda's arms, resulting in making the panda strong, hugging Grizzy and the lemmings forever whilst eating the sesame nougat.
53c	1c	"Domestic Shaolin" "(Shaolin domestique)"	Idriss Benseghir	Josselin Charier; Cédric Lachenaud; Victor Moulin; Antoine Rodelet	Magali Garnier	September 22, 2021	N/A
After being thrown out of the log cabin by Grizzy, the Lemmings find a dragon statue with a mysterious stone in a temple. Touching the stone makes a fleeting tattoo appear on their bellies, temporarily endowing them with the mastery of Shaolin Kung Fu. The Lemmings return to the cabin and uproot Grizzy with ease! But Grizzy has not said his last word and manages to get hold of the magic stone.
54a	2a	"Peaceable Enemies" "(Ennemis pacifiques)"	Victor Moulin	Josselin Charier; Célestine Jacquel-Plays; Victor Moulin; Antoine Rodelet	Ida Pulicani	September 22, 2021	N/A
Grizzy and the Lemmings fight over the tablet. During their scuffle, they knock over an army crate, which falls into the middle of the bamboo forest surrounding the cabin. Alerted by the noise, a peace missionary panda comes out of the forest and tries to calm down the worked-up adversaries. But will the limitless strategies of Grizzy and the Lemmings get the better of the panda's patience?
54b	2b	"The Legend of the Lemmings" "(La Légende des 7 Lemmings)"	Cédric Lachenaud	Josselin Charier; Antoine Rodelet; Victor Moulin; Cedric Lachenaud	Agathe Marmion	September 21, 2021	N/A
The Lemmings create a shadow puppet show where seven papercut Lemmings confront a bear over a jar of Yummy chocolate spread. The Lemmings in the audience are super enthusiastic, but Grizzy is outraged by the treatment inflicted upon the bear. He decides to intervene and equips the paper bear with an armor and saber! The Lemmings retort with ninja effigies of themselves and mount an attack to recover the coveted jar of Yummy spread.
54c	2c	"Dragons & Bears" "(Ours et dragons)"	Idriss Benseghir	Josselin Charier; Célestine Jacquel-Plays; Victor Moulin; Antoine Rodelet	Arthur Moncla	September 22, 2021	N/A
As Grizzy relaxes in the massage chair, a cloud drifts in front of the sun, immediately stopping the electricity supply in the log cabin. The voltage drops continue, even though the sky seems clear now. Grizzy looks out the window and a dragon appears on the horizon! Once over his initial fright, the bear realizes that it's only a kite flown by the Lemmings – using the electricity they have rerouted from the cabin!
55a	3a	"Bamboo Warfare" "(oup de bambou)"	Corentin Lecourt	Idriss Benseghir; Cédric Lachenaud; Victor Moulin	Agathe Marmion	September 22, 2021	N/A
Grizzy dismantles the toboggan built by the Lemmings in the log cabin and reemploys the bamboo sticks to build a jacuzzi. When the Lemmings discover the bear's piece of work, they imagine a giant waterpark dominated by an immense waterslide. Anticipating the Lemmings' desire, Grizzy tries to barricade himself inside, but the rodents manage to eject him from the cabin. The bear comes back, protected by a super bamboo armor…
55b	3b	"Bear in the Clouds" "(Ours dans les nuages)"	Idriss Benseghir	Idriss Benseghir; Cédric Lachenaud; Victor Moulin	Ida Pulicani	September 22, 2021	N/A
The Lemmings organize a drone race throughout the cabin. Grizzy, who was on the verge of falling asleep, interrupts the competition but must contend with the rodents' reprisals. Thrown out of the cabin, the bear falls into a temple dedicated to the Monkey King. He appropriates the statue's powers, the Monkey King's staff and crown that can operate a magic cloud by remote control. Grizzy settles in on the cloud and wins the race before the Lemmings. But a cloud that flies that fast can only arouse excitement…
55c	3c	"Umbrella Tactics" "(Tactique d'ombrelles)"	Victor Moulin	Josselin Charier; Corentin Lecourt; Victor Moulin; Antoine Rodelet	Magali Garnier	September 23, 2021	N/A
To trick Grizzy's vigilance and steal the TV, the Lemmings, disguised as traditional Chinese dancers, perform a number that leaves the bear flabbergasted. The rodents take advantage of their diversion to carry off the TV set on their airborne craft made of Chinese umbrellas. But before they can escape with their bounty, Grizzy recovers the screen. Ever as determined, the Lemmings come back after upgrading their vessel.
56a	4a	"Neither Yin, Nor Yang" "(Ni Yin ni yang)"	Idriss Benseghir	Idriss Benseghir; Cédric Lachenaud; Victor Moulin	Christophe Ollivier-Noborio	September 22, 2021	N/A
Annoyed by a noisy high-speed chase between the Lemmings and a raccoon, Grizzy abruptly stops the game. The players fall into empty space and land in a clearing. The impact of their crash-landing cracks a black and white tile representing Yin and Yang and a strange light pours over the raccoon. Depending on his mood, the color of his fur changes, and his excitement or calm become contagious to all those around him!
56b	4b	"Mechatronics Bear" "(Ours mécatronique)"	Victor Moulin	Josselin Charier; Victor Moulin; Antoine Rodelet	Arthur Moncla	September 23, 2021	N/A
On the way back from a fishing outing, Grizzy unwittingly brings back an electrode that controls a robot. Once activated, the gadget puts itself in the service of the bear, satisfying his each and every need. The envious Lemmings plot to take possession of this new metallic ally. They manage to evict the bear, who does not intend to take this lying down… especially when he discovers a pair of robotic arms hidden in a module that fell out of the robot!
56c	4c	"Tai Chi Lemmings"	Idriss Benseghir	Idriss Benseghir; Josselin Charier; Antoine Rodelet; Victor Moulin	Thierry Mesnage-Boutry	September 23, 2021	N/A
After a game that ends abruptly, the Lemmings fall onto the roof of a temple where they discover drawings of Tai Chi movements. When carried out, the exercises generate a ball of energy! The Lemmings test out the sequence of movements on… Grizzy, until he is evicted from the cabin and falls onto the temple in turn. His fall unveils a new sequence of movements on a fresco that could create an even stronger energy flow!
57a	5a	"Fireworks Cabin" "(Cabane d'Artifice)"	Victor Moulin	Josselin Charier; Célestine Jacquel-Plays; Victor Moulin; Antoine Rodelet	Magali Garnier	September 23, 2021	N/A
At nightfall, just as Grizzy starts to doze off, a racket comes from outside the cabin: the Lemmings are sliding along the Great Wall in a crate, propelled by firework rockets. Cleverly avoiding the bear's strategies to stop them, the Lemmings accidentally set off a mechanism in a tower. A secret room filled with cannons and catapults opens, just waiting to be used by the powder monkey apprentices…
57b	5b	"Diving in the Wild" "(Plongée sauvage)"	Idriss Benseghir	Josselin Charier; Victor Moulin; Antoine Rodelet; Alexandre So	Magali Garnier	September 23, 2021	N/A
Grizzy and the Lemmings fight over the last jar of Yummy chocolate spread in the cabin, and it ends up sinking in the lagoon. The bear makes a diving suit from various home facilities, while the Lemmings share a diving tank to put a wrench in their adversary's flippers! But the local wildlife comes to greet them.
57c	5c	"Choco-Coco" "(Cocochoco)"	Célestine Jacquel-Plays	Josselin Charier; Célestine Jacquel-Plays; Victor Moulin; Antoine Rodelet	Magali Garnier	September 24, 2021	N/A
Grizzy wakes up after a nap, starving, but the last jar of Yummy chocolate spread is empty. The cupboards are barren, except for a package of chocolate powder. Grizzy has the idea of mixing it with coconut milk. It's absolutely delicious! But the Lemmings, who are every bit as gluttonous, want their share of the choco-coco drink!
58a	6a	"Parasailing Fishing" "(Pêche ascensionnelle)"	Célestine Jacquel-Plays	Josselin Charier; Célestine Jacquel-Plays; Victor Moulin; Antoine Rodelet	Christophe Ollivier-Noborio	September 25, 2021	N/A
Grizzy gets a nice big bite on the end of his fishing line. While he concentrates hard to strike his catch, the Lemmings divert the fish to tow them on a kite. Grizzy tries to sabotage their improvised kitesurfing game to recover what's rightfully his, until a shark's fin appears on the horizon!
58b	6b	"Yummy Pirates" "(Piratage à tartiner)"	Corentin Lecourt	Josselin Charier; Corentin Lecourt; Victor Moulin; Antoine Rodelet	Jérémy Klein	September 24, 2021	N/A
The cupboards of the log cabin are hopelessly empty and Grizzy's belly is rumbling. Through his binoculars, he observes the overexcited Lemmings slipping all sorts of small metal objects into the slot of… a Yummy vending machine!?! The bear joins them on the pontoon. If only they could find some coins to make the machine work. Maybe the solution is to find the booty indicated on the treasure map they unearthed on the beach?
58c	6c	"Sea Excursion" "(Virée en Mer)"	Célestine Jacquel-Plays	Josselin Charier; Célestine Jacquel-Plays; Victor Moulin; Antoine Rodelet	Agathe Marmion	September 23, 2021	N/A
After accidentally breaking his favorite sofa, Grizzy spots a cozy fishing cabin on a neighboring island. He requisitions the Lemmings' canoe to get there but discovers that the new cabin is dilapidated and lacking all comfort. The poor bear had been deluded by a poster. However, a fabulous yacht is moored nearby. It catches both his attention and that of the Lemmings, who have just disembarked on the island!
59a	7a	"Sand Lemmings" "(Lemmings des Sables)"	Idriss Benseghir	Idriss Benseghir; Josselin Charier; Cédric Lachenaud; Victor Moulin; Antoine Rodelet	Franck Monier	September 23, 2021	N/A
The Lemmings have fun taking potshots at sand statues depicting Grizzy. Outraged, he catapults them far into the distance. Grizzy takes advantage of their absence to erect a monumental sculpture of himself. But just as he takes a selfie in front of the sculpture, Grizzy realizes that the Lemmings have laid hands on… a pirate cannon!
59b	7b	"Non-Peaceful Coaching" "(Coaching pas pacifique)"	Idriss Benseghir	Idriss Benseghir; Josselin Charier; Corentin Lecourt; Antoine Rodelet	Sarah Amrani	September 24, 2021	N/A
After being hit over the head, the Lemmings become hypnotized by a fitness poster and believe they are now sports coaches. They are determined to forcefully train Grizzy, who would much rather lounge around than do push-ups and squats. But the Lemmings' new personality makes them particularly overbearing.
59c	7c	"Bear in Troubled Waters" "(Ours en eaux troubles)"	Cédric Lachenaud	Victor Moulin; Cédric Lachenaud; Célestine Jacquel-Plays	Magali Garnier	September 24, 2021	N/A
Nothing seems to be biting Grizzy's fishing rod and the bear is in despair. Suddenly he spots a fabulous swordfish swimming in the lagoon. The bear is already licking his chops, when he sees the Lemmings straddling the fish in a rodeo game. From inside the cabin using a mooring post, Grizzy manages to snare the swordfish and is about to pull it in, but the Lemmings are riding it toward the high seas. Each party tugs hard. And the cabin starts to slide…
60a	8a	"Earthquake-Proof Bear" "(Ours antisismique)"	Jérémy Klein	Josselin Charier; Victor Moulin; Antoine Rodelet	Idriss Benseghir	September 24, 2021	N/A
The Lemmings discover that several drops of Tabasco sauce poured into a rock fault releases powerful sprays of steam that propel them high into the sky on a pot lid. Except that the entire volcanic island shudders each time the drops are poured. Grizzy, who has decided to take a nap in his hammock, confiscates the bottle before realizing that the Lemmings have an entire stock!
60b	8b	"The Spirit of Competition" "(Esprits de compétition)"	Victor Moulin	Josselin Charier; Corentin Lecourt; Victor Moulin; Antoine Rodelet	Ida Pulicani	September 25, 2021	N/A
The Lemmings have decided to organize a race with two sand yachts they found on the beach. The only thing missing is a worthy adversary. They put Grizzy, who was taking a nap, on one of the yachts without waking him up. And the race is off. Grizzy wakes up in shock onboard his sand yacht.
60c	8c	"Odd-Job Crab" "(Crabe à tout faire)"	Corentin Lecourt	Josselin Charier; Cédric Lachenaud; Victor Moulin; Antoine Rodelet	Ida Pulicani	September 24, 2021	N/A
Grizzy has run out of ideas to open his coconut until he sees the Lemmings' new friend (which is a crab) open one with a simple snip of the claw. He confiscates the crustacean and uses it to take the tops off his coconuts. As they fight over the crab, the characters discover a remote-control device in a secret grotto that operates a giant crab. Grizzy takes over the controls, but the Lemmings want to play with the joystick too!
61a	9a	"Ordeal of Comfort" "(Épreuve de confort)"	Idriss Benseghir	Idriss Benseghir; Josselin Charier; Victor Moulin; Antoine Rodelet	Arthur Moncla	September 24, 2021	N/A
A helicopter takes off from the beach, leaving behind installations for a TV game, namely lots of food supplies – which are locked up. To access the keys and the food, participants must win team tests under the surveillance of a drone. The Lemmings are the yellow team. The red team is composed of Grizzy, an oar, and a flabbergasted crab!
61b	9b	"Outboard Cabin" "(Cabane Hors Bors)"	Corentin Lecourt	Josselin Charier; Corentin Lecourt; Victor Moulin; Antoine Rodelet	Arthur Moncla	September 25, 2021	N/A
While trying to avoid the Lemmings' outboard speedboat, Grizzy punctures his air mattress and is propelled into a hidden grotto where he finds a conch decorated with Maori symbols that can control whales. Grizzy returns, proudly straddling his cetacean and chases the Lemmings from his peaceful spot. But the Lemmings' imagination is equal to the size of this potential new playmate!
61c	9c	"Parental Overload" "(Surcharge parentale)"	Célestine Jacquel-Plays	Josselin Charier; Célestine Jacquel-Plays; Victor Moulin; Antoine Rodelet	Agathe Marmion	October 4, 2021	N/A
As they fight over a pot of Yummy, Grizzy and the Lemmings come face to face with a crying polar bear cub. Seeing them, he starts bawling even more. Annoyed by the cub's tantrum, the bear and the rodents try to calm the noisy little one, but nothing helps. After feeding and changing the baby, it finally falls asleep ... How will they resume the Yummy battle without waking the teddy bear?
62a	10a	"The Attraction of Lemmings" "(Attraction de Lemmings)"	Corentin Lecourt	Josselin Charier; Cédric Lachenaud; Victor Moulin; Antoine Rodelet	Sarah Amrani	October 4, 2021	N/A
A meteorite falls not far from the hut. While the Lemmings are sledding on a metal cover, their sled is suddenly pulled towards the alien rock. In heaven, the rodents start their slide again with the TV dish. But Grizzy intervenes and tries to bring the antenna back at all costs, confronting the magnetism of the meteorite and drawing the wrath of the Lemmings who have decided to play ...
62b	10b	"Extreme Domino" "(Domino extrême)"	Cédric Lachenaud	Josselin Charier; Cédric Lachenaud; Victor Moulin; Antoine Rodelet	Agathe Marmion	October 4, 2021	N/A
The Lemmings have set up a long string of dominoes in the hut, which ends in gigantic blocks of ice and a rocket outside. Tired of not being able to find the calm he hoped for, Grizzy sabotaged the course. The rocket strikes a block of ice which causes, while falling, a blast destroying the hut. Grizzy gets his hands on a machine that can carve ice cream. While the bear dreams of an igloo, the Lemmings have other plans ...
62c	10c	"Surprise Deglaciation" "(Déglaciation sauvage)"	Célestine Jacquel-Plays	Josselin Charier; Cédric Lachenaud; Victor Moulin; Antoine Rodelet	Jérémy Klein	October 5, 2021	N/A
The Lemmings notice a block of ice in front of the hut, which contains a frozen animal. This is a prehistoric saber-toothed raccoon. Softened, the Lemmings release him and want to domesticate him like a kitten. But the raccoon, when he plays, is a real tornado. Upon awakening, Grizzy discovers the cabin upside down. He's furious. But the wild raccoon intervenes in front of the bear when the latter wants to dislodge the rodents ...
63a	11a	"Thermal Lemmings" "(Lemmings thermiques)"	Corentin Lecourt	Josselin Charier; Corentin Lecourt; Victor Moulin; Antoine Rodelet	Magali Garnier	October 5, 2021	N/A
Grizzy and the Lemmings accidentally find a container full of gourds of food. Mainly vegetables, they do not find favor with the eyes of the bear who are interested in high-tech material at the bottom of the crate. Behind her back, the Lemmings, on the other hand, found a gourd of Yummy. They run off with it. But how do you escape Grizzy equipped with his sophisticated gear?
63b	11b	"Substitute Egg" "(Œuf de substitution)"	Corentin Lecourt	Cédric Lachenaud; Corentin Lecourt; Victor Moulin	Christophe Ollivier-Noborio	October 5, 2021	N/A
In a trunk, Grizzy and the Lemmings find a large chocolate egg that contains a surprise. Everyone licks their chops with envy. In their argument and by accident, they send the coveted egg to a group of neighboring penguins. He is adopted by a pair of birds who begin to brood on him, as if they were his own offspring. Unimpressed, Grizzy and the Lemmings seek to seize it, but the entire bird colony intervenes.
63c	11c	"Lemming Constellation" "(La constellation du Lemming)"	Cédric Lachenaud	Idriss Benseghir; Cédric Lachenaud; Victor Moulin	Fanny Marseau	October 6, 2021	N/A
The Lemmings are setting up a nightclub, with loud music and a mirror ball, in an igloo they have built not far from the cabin. The noise keeps Grizzy from sleeping. The bear confiscates the disco ball and throws the Lemmings away from him. They land in an ice cave where they discover a console that allows you to light up the stars in the sky and control the Northern Lights ... The sky begins to flash. The Lemmings transform the ice floes into an open-air nightclub!
64a	12a	"Spinning Lemmings (2)" "(Tournez lemmings)"	Fanny Marseau	Célestine Jacquel-Plays; Cédric Lachenaud; Victor Moulin	Célestine Jacquel-Plays	October 6, 2021	N/A
The Lemmings have improvised a funfair-worthy attraction in the living room. Awake, Grizzy throws their centrifuge out and the Lemmings land in the nearby science station and accidentally wakes up… a mammoth! A bond is born between them, and the Lemmings involve the mastodon in their game. This new giant friend makes it possible to transform the entire cabin into a big wheel. Grizzy, who wanted to sleep peacefully, wakes up in panic ...
64b	12b	"Polar Super Star" "(Super star polaire)"	Idriss Benseghir	Idriss Benseghir; Cédric Lachenaud; Victor Moulin	Jérémy Klein	October 6, 2021	N/A
Facing an audience of penguins and walruses, the Lemmings put on a show of acrobatic high jumps. Two Lemmings teams compete for the winner's award. By accident, Grizzy participates, but quickly gets caught up in the game, causing applause to explode! Intoxicated by his victory, the bear has no modest success! But the Lemmings also want their place on the front of the stage!
64c	12c	"My Friend the Penguin" "(Mon ami le pingouin)"	Victor Moulin	Idriss Benseghir; Josselin Charier; Antoine Rodelet; Victor Moulin	Christophe Ollivier-Noborio	October 7, 2021	N/A
While Grizzy is fishing, a penguin approaches and finds that his bucket is empty. He decides to help him and brings him many fish. The bear, impressed, brings him back to the cabin and quickly a bond develops between the two. This pleasant and friendly new companion arouses the curiosity of Lemmings. They attract the penguin and replace it with a slightly beta one, behind Grizzy's back, who will quickly notice the deception.
65a	13a	"Thermal Shock!" "(Choc thermique !)"	Idriss Benseghir	Idriss Benseghir; Cédric Lachenaud; Victor Moulin	Christophe Ollivier-Noborio	October 7, 2021	N/A
Grizzy settles down on the couch by the fire, when the Lemmings tumble into the middle of the living room riding a makeshift mount with the vacuum cleaner. Irritated, the bear throws their mechanical steed into the exploding chimney. Freezing cold enters the cabin. Seeking warmth, Grizzy decides to move into the greenhouse at the nearby science station, which is air-conditioned by a drone. But the bear doesn't know he's bringing in his luggage ... the Lemmings!
65b	13b	"Primitive Activities" "(Activités primitives)"	Victor Moulin	Josselin Charier; Cédric Lachenaud; Victor Moulin; Antoine Rodelet	Arthur Moncla	October 7, 2021	N/A
The Lemmings have found a new playmate: a walrus! The rodents ride it across the entire hut and then slide it onto the roof, before starting over. Grizzy intervenes and manages to eject the animal to the bottom of a mysterious ice cave. In its center, a dolmen on which is a bone. Anyone who touches it is made docile and its appearance becomes prehistoric. The Lemmings hatch a plan in which Grizzy would bend to their will ...
65c	13c	"Cabin on Ice" "(Cabane sur glace)"	Idriss Benseghir	Josselin Charier; Cédric Lachenaud; Victor Moulin; Antoine Rodelet	Magali Garnier	October 8, 2021	N/A
When Grizzy goes fishing, the Lemmings jump on the opportunity to transform the cabin into a giant ice slide. Upon his return, the bear puts an end to the rodents’ bobsleigh party and gets ready to savor his day's catch. But the Lemmings steal his fish and draw the bear outside the cabin. Grizzy must try to recover his lunch while protecting his territory from a rodent invasion.
66a	14a	"Return of the Beloved Being" "(Retour de l’être aimé)"	Corentin Lecourt	Josselin ChariervCorentin Lecourt; Victor Moulin; Antoine Rodelet	Agathe Marmion	October 8, 2021	N/A
Grizzy steals from the Lemmings a magical statuette that has the power to make certain objects appear in reality. All you have to do is pin the photo of whatever you want. Too bad for the rodent snowmobile! Grizzy replaces the photo of the vehicle with the portrait of the bear he fell in love with and remained in Canada. As soon as they arrive, the bear disappears, due to a cunning rodent. It's the start of a bitter argument ...
66b	14b	"Masked Powers" "(Pouvoirs masqués)"	Célestine Jacquel-Plays	Célestine Jacquel-Plays; Cédric Lachenaud; Victor Moulin	Agathe Marmion	October 8, 2021	N/A
Annoyed by the Lemmings' new magnetic train game, Grizzy throws the group away from the cabin. The rodents land in a nearby wizard's hut. A mysterious mask falls on one of them and grants him the power of telekinesis. The Lemmings are exulting! They return to the cabin and, with this magical power, fly all the furniture they sit on to complete their life-size flying train part!
66c	14c	"Roaring Lemmings" "(Lemmings vrombissants)"	Cédric Lachenaud	Célestine Jacquel-Plays; Cédric Lachenaud; Victor Moulin	Arthur Moncla	October 9, 2021	N/A
Grizzy runs after the Lemmings who have loaded a jar of Yummy into their RC car. At the gas station, the bear manages to destroy the vehicle and recover the spread. The rodents then find small carts and chase Grizzy to the edge of the cabin. They bring it down and intercept the coveted pot. Powerless, the bear sets off in pursuit of them, until they cross the road of a tanker full of Yummy ...
67a	15a	"Mini Troubles" "(Minis ennuis)"	Célestine Jacquel-Plays	Célestine Jacquel-Plays; Cédric Lachenaud; Victor Moulin	Magali Garnier	October 9, 2021	N/A
When they land on a sorcerer's hut, the Lemmings take possession of a magic scepter that has the ability to temporarily shrink objects. Now microscopic-sized, the rodents return to the cabin to get their paws on chocolate spread.
67b	15b	"For Peanuts" "(Pour des cacahuètes)"	Corentin Lecourt	Cédric Lachenaud; Corentin Lecourt; Victor Moulin	Fanny Marseau	October 9, 2021	N/A
Grizzy wakes up starving but the cupboards are empty. While the Lemmings play nearby with an elephant, the bear swipes their peanut reserves. Not at all pleased, the rodents decide to recover their bag of nuts.
67c	15c	"Within Snout's Reach" "(A portée de groin)"	Idriss Benseghir	Idriss Benseghir; Josselin Charier; Victor Moulin; Antoine Rodelet	Agathe Marmion	October 10, 2021	N/A
Grizzy and the Lemmings fight over a pack of crunch. The crunches fall to the ground and just then a pig enters the cabin and eats the whole package. They find another pack of crunch above the cabin, but Grizzy and the Lemmings get it to pigs, too. The pig sniffs and goes to another food source. Grizzy and the Lemmings realize that he is a sniffer and decide to follow him.
68a	16a	"Safari Express"	Cédric Lachenaud	Idriss Benseghir; Cédric Lachenaud; Victor Moulin	Ida Pulicani	October 10, 2021	N/A
To win a trophy full of Yummy candies, Grizzy and the Lemmings enter a photo contest with safari in an animal reserve. In this competition they need to photograph some wild animals, Grizzy and the Lemmings are determined to do it, but when it comes to the blue-necked super-speedy ostrich, it's not as easy as they think.
68b	16b	"False Children" "(Faux fils)"	Victor Moulin	Josselin Charier; Célestine Jacquel-Plays; Victor Moulin; Antoine Rodelet	Magali Garnier	October 10, 2021	N/A
Grizzy and the Lemmings were fighting over the Yummy jar. Grizzy grabs the jar and decides to eat it at a picnic spot not far from the cabin. Throws the Lemmings with a sand-soaked zorbing ball. An ostrich thinks this sandy ball is its own egg. That's why it thinks the Lemmings are his own nestlings. But will this event perhaps give the Lemmings an advantage?
68c	16c	"Game of Stone" "(Le trône de pierre)"	Idriss Benseghir	Idriss Benseghir; Josselin Charier; Victor Moulin; Antoine Rodelet	Axel De Lafforest; Magali Garnier	October 11, 2021	N/A
Grizzy and the Lemmings are ejected out of the hut and land on a small hill nearby, where they find a golden throne. Whoever sits on it will be king. Taking all African life under his command will benefit both Grizzy and the Lemmings. For the Lemmings, the elephant is a source of entertainment! Grizzy, on the other hand, wants to take advantage of this for comfort and pleasure. The armchair war begins!
69a	17a	"Tam-Tam Lemming"	Victor Moulin	Idriss Benseghir; Cédric Lachenaud; Victor Moulin	Jérémy Klein; Arthur Moncla	October 11, 2021	N/A
Grizzy is brutally awakened by four Lemmings who are giving a grand percussion concert near the cabin, while the rest of the group dances to the rhythm. The grumpy bear puts an end to the festivities.
69b	17b	"Ice Madness!" "(Complètement givré !)"	Idriss Benseghir	Idriss Benseghir; Cédric Lachenaud; Victor Moulin	Charlotte Chtati	October 11, 2021	N/A
In the midst of a heat wave, Grizzy and the Lemmings fight over the fridge. The rodents want to transform themselves into ice cubes to glide across their super curling ice slide, while Grizzy wishes merely to lie down inside the nice, cool appliance. After literally breaking the fridge in two, the Lemmings discover a container of refrigerant and create a new giant curling sheet in the savannah. But Grizzy has not given up the idea of resting in a cool spot!
69c	17c	"In Your Dreams" "(Dans tes rêves)"	Célestine Jacquel-Plays	Idriss Benseghir; Cédric Lachenaud; Corentin Lecourt	Marion Charve	October 12, 2021	N/A
The Lemmings turn the cabin into a fun skating rink with their new skates. Grizzy gets annoyed by this and takes the skates and runs away. Wanting the skates back, the Lemmings go after Grizzy. During the chase, they fall into the wizard's hut. Here the Lemmings find a historical helmet where you can control dreams any way you want. Grizzy realizes this and wants to try.
70a	18a	"Super-Voltaic Cabin" "(Cabane supervoltaïque)"	Victor Moulin	Josselin Charier; Cédric Lachenaud; Victor Moulin; Antoine Rodelet	Magali Garnier	October 12, 2021	N/A
Grizzy watches a documentary, but the Lemmings want to dance in the garage, nightclub style. TV versus music, the energy war has begun!
70b	18b	"1 + 1 = 1"	Idriss Benseghir	Idriss Benseghir; Corentin LeCourt; Victor Moulin	Florian Bouthinon Dumas	March 7, 2022	N/A
A confrontation between Grizzy and the Lemmings leads to a room in the castle tower. The bear accidentally sets off a mechanism and discovers a large medieval magic trunk. When placed inside, the trunk can blend two objects.
70c	18c	"Jelly Lemmings" "(Lemmings en gelée)"	Cédric Lachenaud	Célestine Jacquel-Plays; Cédric Lachenaud; Victor Moulin	Ida Pulicani	March 7, 2022	N/A
When the Lemmings spoil Grizzy's meal with their new game, the bear evicts them far from the cabin. They crash onto a faraway picnic table. All except one, who bounces off some jelly pudding which was left behind.
71a	19a	"Javelin Lemmings" "(Lancer de Lemmings)"	Célestine Jacquel-Plays	Josselin Charier; Célestine Jacquel-Plays; Victor Moulin; Antoine Rodelet	Ida Pulicani	March 7, 2022	N/A
The Lemmings are holding a log throwing competition that stops short when Grizzy sends them soaring into the distance. The rodents land upon an ancient Celtic site where they happen upon a magic bracelet that increases strength.
71b	19b	"Franken-Grizzy" "(FrankenGrizzy)"	Corentin LeCourt	Josselin Charier; Corentin LeCourt; Victor Moulin; Antoine Rodelet	Arthur Moncla	March 8, 2022	N/A
Grizzy and the Lemmings fight over the TV remote control. The argument leads the bear to the summit of the castle tower during a storm. In a secret room, he glimpses a human form by the light of a lightning bolt.
71c	19c	"Lemming on Canvas" "(Lemmings sur toile)"	Idriss Benseghir	Célestine Jacquel-Plays; Cédric Lachenaud; Victor Moulin	Florian Bouthinon Dumas	March 8, 2022	N/A
Grizzy wants to paint himself on the next painting and swipes the artwork along with the rodents' paint kit. The furious Lemmings are determined to recover their material. It's a dispute that could be qualified as... artsy.
72a	20a	"Musical Discord" "(Désaccord musical)"	Corentin Lecourt	Cédric Lachenaud; Corentin Lecourt; Victor Moulin	Charlotte Chtati	March 8, 2022	N/A
The Lemmings improvise a trampoline with bagpipes, only each jump is accompanied by a deafening outburst. Grizzy steps in and hurls the object far from the castle. The rodents catch up with it on a mystical nearby isle.
72b	20b	"A Bear in the Sheepfold" "(Un ours dans la bergerie)"	Célestine Jacquel-Plays	Josselin Charier; Célestine Jacquel-Plays; Cédric Lachenaud; Victor Moulin; Antoine Rodelet	Charlotte Chtati	March 9, 2022	N/A
Grizzy puts a stop to the Lemmings' furious rodeo game on a sheep. Annoyed, they decide to banish the bear to the bottom of the castle dungeons while he's taking a nap. In his prison, Grizzy finds a magic shepherd's crook.
72c	20c	"Jelly World" "(La communauté de la Jelly)"	Idriss Benseghir	Idriss Benseghir; Josselin Charier; Victor Moulin; Antoine Rodelet	Agathe Marmion	March 9, 2022	N/A
While fighting over a jelly cake, Grizzy banishes the Lemmings to the castle dungeons and the rodents discover a passageway leading to a secret elfin room.
73a	21a	"Pet Sheep" "(Mouton de compagnie)"	Cédric Lachenaud	Célestine Jacquel-Plays; Cédric Lachenaud; Victor Moulin	Fanny Marseau	March 9, 2022	N/A
The Lemmings take Polaroid snapshots of themselves disguised outside the castle along with a sheep who poses with them, and the little sheep warms up Grizzy's heart.
73b	21b	"Sheep Joust" "(Joutes Moutons)"	Victor Moulin	Idriss Benseghir; Josselin Charier; Victor Moulin; Antoine Rodelet	Jérémy Klein	March 10, 2022	N/A
Grizzy is pulled from his dreams by the noise made by the Lemmings, perched on sheep, and who oppose each other in jousting. The cunning bear gets rid of rodents by driving their mounts away with food. Angered, the Lemmings hatch a plan to keep the bear away from the castle during his nap and keep him from coming back. Furious at being thus banished, the bear, armed with a catapult, prepares to retaliate...
73c	21c	"Foodie Phantoms" "(Esprits gourmands)"	Corentin LeCourt	Josselin Charier; Corentin LeCourt; Victor Moulin; Antoine Rodelet	Ida Pulicani	March 10, 2022	N/A
Grizzy pursues the Lemmings throughout the castle to recover the jelly cake they stole from him.
74a	22a	"Bookfair" "(Foire aux bouquins)"	Célestine Jacquel-Plays	Josselin Charier; Célestine Jacquel-Plays; Victor Moulin; Antoine Rodelet	Agathe Marmion	March 10, 2022	N/A
Grizzy and the Lemmings fight over a giant jelly cake and discover a secret passage.
74b	22b	"Unpractical Cabin" "(Cabane pas commode)"	Corentin Lecourt	Josselin Charier; Cédric Lachenaud; Corentin Lecourt; Victor Moulin; Antoine Rodelet	Agathe Marmion	March 11, 2022	N/A
Grizzy chases the Lemmings throughout the castle to swipe the delicious jelly cake they were about to eat. He locks them inside a closet and makes off with the dessert. In the closet, the rodents discover a card to teleport.
74c	22c	"The Bear, the Frog, and the Mosquito" "(L'ours, la grenouille et le moustique)"	Idriss Benseghir	Idriss Benseghir; Cédric Lachenaud; Victor Moulin	Fanny Marseau	March 11, 2022	N/A
The Lemmings have fun bouncing on the backs of green frogs while Grizzy hunts mosquitoes.
75a	23a	"Musical Battle" "(Battle musicale)"	Corentin Lecourt	Célestine Jacquel-Plays; Corentin Lecourt; Victor Moulin	Magali Garnier	March 11, 2022	N/A
Grizzy comes home and discovers the Lemmings dancing.
75b	23b	"Day and Night" "(Décalage solaire)"	Cédric Lachenaud	Célestine Jacquel-Plays; Victor Moulin; Cédric Lachenaud	Magali Garnier	March 12, 2022	N/A
The Lemmings discover a spherical object that can control Earth's rotation.
75c	23c	"Tilted Lemmings" "(Lemmings tiltés)"	Célestine Jacquel-Plays	Josselin Charier; Célestine Jacquel-Plays; Victor Moulin; Antoine Rodelet	Charlotte Chtati	March 12, 2022	N/A
The Lemmings have got their hands on an old pinball machine which they are installing in the cabin. Their frenzied game interrupts Grizzy's nap, which threatens to break the machine. The bear gets locked in the garage by the rodents, but he finds a way to escape and get rid of the game and all of its players. Dropped into the jungle, the Lemmings stumble upon a rubber tree. By discovering its rebounding power, they have the idea of making a giant pinball machine in the middle of the trees...
76a	24a	"Recreational Botany" "(Botanique ludique)"	Célestine Jacquel-Plays	Célestine Jacquel-Plays; Cédric Lachenaud; Victor Moulin	Arthur Moncla	March 12, 2022	N/A
A Super Lemming transforms any plant he touches into a giant.
76b	24b	"Generation Conflict" "(Conflit de générations)"	Corentin Lecourt	Idriss Benseghir; Corentin Lecourt; Victor Moulin	Ida Pulicani	March 13, 2022	N/A
During a fight, Grizzy and the Lemmings discover a Mayan temple in the middle of the jungle. Inside, they trigger a magical reaction that causes duplicates of themselves to appear at a different age: a child Grizzy and old Lemmings. Grizzy tries to interest the young bear in the salmon documentary, while the Lemmings want to introduce their ancestors to the dance. But the age difference is heavily felt...
76c	24c	"Breathless" "(A bout de souffle)"	Idriss Benseghir	Idriss Benseghir; Josselin Charier; Victor Moulin; Antoine Rodelet	Florian Bouthinon Dumas	March 13, 2022	N/A
Grizzy discovers a magic blowpipe in a canoe filled with traditional fishing gear.
77a	25a	"Ancient Brainteaser" "(Casse-tête aztèque)"	Célestine Jacquel-Plays	Josselin Charier; Célestine Jacquel-Plays; Victor Moulin; Antoine Rodelet	Jérémy Klein	March 13, 2022	N/A
The Lemmings take off with the last jar of Yummy chocolate spread. Grizzy catches up with them, but they drop the jar, and it lands in a nearby sacred temple. While trying to get inside, they accidentally activate a mechanism.
77b	25b	"Couch Wrestling" "(Catch canap)"	Idriss Benseghir	Idriss Benseghir; Cédric Lachenaud; Victor Moulin	Magali Garnier	March 14, 2022	N/A
The Lemmings organize wrestling combats on the living room couch. Grizzy, weary of the clamor, stops the match. The displeased Lemmings retaliate, but during their fight the cabin's wood floor caves in.
77c	25c	"Goldrush" "(Ruée vers l'or)"	Corentin Lecourt	Célestine Jacquel-Plays; Corentin Lecourt; Victor Moulin	Magali Garnier	March 14, 2022	N/A
After a spat over a jar of Yummy, Grizzy and the Lemmings find gold leaf-wrapped chocolate bits scattered in the jungle. Delicious! On the backs of a bat and a tapir, the rodents and the bear fight over the harvest of candy.
78a	26a	"Theft Reactions" "(Vol à réaction)"	Idriss Benseghir	Josselin Charier; Cédric Lachenaud; Victor Moulin; Antoine Rodelet	Fanny Marseau	March 14, 2022	N/A
Grizzy and the Lemmings fight over the last spoonful of Yummy. Their brawl is interrupted when they happen upon a full crate of chocolate spread in the garage. The rodents snatch the crate and take off on a drone.
78b	26b	"High Tension Fireflies" "(Lucioles à haute tension)"	Célestine Jacquel-Plays	Josselin Charier; Célestine Jacquel-Plays; Victor Moulin; Antoine Rodelet	Marion Charve	March 15, 2022	N/A
The solar panels don't generate enough electricity for Grizzy's TV at night. He sees the Lemmings playing with fireflies and shoots them away. They land on a temple and find a magical tiara. Grizzy would like to have it.
78c	26c	"Skull of Discord" "(Crâne de discorde)"	Corentin LeCourt	Josselin Charier; Corentin Lecourt; Victor Moulin; Antoine Rodelet	Frank Monier	March 15, 2022	N/A
After stealing Grizzy's jar of Yummy chocolate spread, the Lemmings propel the bear far from the log cabin. Grizzy lands in a temple where he finds a crystal skull which gives you the power to sow discord within a group. When the lemmings take it, Grizzy finds another skull which gives you the power to make whoever is zapped fall in love with you. After a chase, the jar breaks, but a crate of Yummy gets dropped off, but the love skull breaks, causing Grizzy and the Lemmings to attract some rhinos who eat all of the Yummy jars, leaving the bear and the rodents fed up.

=== Season 4 (2024–25) ===
Season 4 takes Grizzy and the Lemmings to a rainforest jungle (picking up where they left off at the end of Season 3); snowy Antarctica; a tropical island in the Pacific Ocean; the African desert; the Great Wall of China; and the highlands of Scotland respectively before returning home to Canada in the season finale.

No. overall	No. in season	Title	Directed by	Written by	Storyboard by	Original release date	France viewers (millions)
79a	1a	"Star of the Day" "(Star du jour)"	Camille Scarella	Josselin Charier; Antoine Rodelet; Célestine Jacquel-Plays; Camille Scarella	Charlotte Chtati	May 15, 2024	N/A
While climbing back to the cabin carrying a load of delicious berries, Grizzy trips and falls over backwards. He performs a series of acrobatics worthy of a diving champ and resurfaces safe and sound despite himself.
79b	1b	"Diabolical Labyrinth" "(Dédale Infernal)"	Alexis De Jesus Costa; Timothée Mironneau	Josselin Charier; Antoine Rodelet; Célestine Jacquel-Plays; Victor Moulin	Jérôme Fardini	May 15, 2024	N/A
Grizzy and the Lemmings lose their jar of chocolate spread in a labyrinthian Temple. Determined to recover their favorite afternoon snack, they confront one another in the maze, but end up getting totally lost.
79c	1c	"Cozy Nest" "(Nid douillet)"	Camille Scarella	Josselin Charier; Antoine Rodelet; Célestine Jacquel-Plays; Camille Scarella	Fanny Marseau	May 16, 2024	N/A
Things start to disappear from the log cabin as if by magic. Grizzy is persuaded that the Lemmings are the culprits, but the Lemmings are also victims of inexplicable thefts. Grizzy and Lemmings join forces to infiltrate the nest.
80a	2a	"Strong Will" "(Volonté de Fer)"	Alexis De Jesus Costa; Timothée Mironneau	Josselin Charier; Antoine Rodelet; Cédric Lachenaud; Célestine Jacquel-Plays	Estelle Yven	May 16, 2024	N/A
A frog swallows an ancestral jewel that bestows it with the power of mind control. Grizzy uses the frog to swallow the flies that have proliferated in the cabin, and which now let themselves be docility caught.
80b	2b	"Desired Orientation" "(Orienté à Souhait)"	Camille Scarella	Josselin Charier; Antoine Rodelet; Célestine Jacquel-Plays; Camille Scarella; Camille Béatrix-Drouhet	Idriss Benseghir	May 17, 2024	N/A
A military convoy has an accident while transporting top-secret material. In the impact, a technological sphere flies out and rolls over to Grizzy, who was gathering berries. Grizzy realizes that the sphere is a sort of compass.
80c	2c	"24-Carat Chocolate" "(Chocolat 24 carats)"	Alexis De Jesus Costa; Timothée Mironneau	Josselin Charier; Antoine Rodelet; Célestine Jacquel-Plays; Victor Moulin; Alexis De Jesus Costa	Jérôme Fardini	May 17, 2024	N/A
Grizzy finds a hand-shaped scepter ornated with a gold nugget that covers anything it touches with gold. Grizzy uses the object to "gold leaf" the Lemmings and swipe their chocolate bar.
81a	3a	"Jungle Rhythm" "(Le Rythme dans le Pot)"	Camille Scarella	Célestine Jacquel-Plays; Cédric Lachenaud; Camille Scarella	Timothée Mironneau	May 18, 2024	N/A
The Lemmings organize a dance contest where the first prize is a jar of chocolate spread. Grizzy is hungry and decides to participate. Incapable of sharing, Grizzy and the Lemmings fight over the prize.
81b	3b	"The Grizming" "(Le Grizming)"	Alexis De Jesus Costa; Timothée Mironneau	Josselin Charier; Antoine Rodelet; Célestine Jacquel-Plays; Victor Moulin; Cédric Lachenaud	Florian Guivarch	May 18, 2024	N/A
Grizzy finds a strange creature fossilized in amber resin that resembles him. A natural science encyclopedia confirms that it's his ancestor. Grizzy wants to take the block of amber, but the Lemmings fight him for it.
81c	3c	"For Real" "(Pour de vrai)"	Alexis De Jesus Costa; Timothée Mironneau	Josselin Charier; Antoine Rodelet; Cédric Lachenaud; Victor Moulin	Jérôme Fardini	May 19, 2024	N/A
The Lemmings find a strange card game representing the elements. The idea is to pretend that the ground is on fire or of ice, like in the game "Floor is Lava." They transform the cabin into a giant adventure trail.
82a	4a	"Cocoa Tree Spread" "(Arbre à Tartiner)"	Camille Scarella	Josselin Charier; Antoine Rodelet; Victor Moulin; Camille Scarella; Camille Béatrix-Drouhet	Florian Guivrrch	May 19, 2024	N/A
The Lemmings discover a very particular cocoa tree with chocolate-spread sap! Reduced to eating canned Brussels sprouts, the only remaining food in the cabin, Grizzy is baffled when he sees the Lemmings parading past.
82b	4b	"Wild Mutations" "(Mutations sauvages)"	Camille Scarella	Célestine Jacquel-Plays; Victor Moulin; Camille Scarella	Estelle Yven	May 20, 2024	N/A
Grizzy expels the Lemmings from the cabin where they had built a cumbersome obstacle course. Peaceful at last and feeling lazy, he is determined not to leave his couch. The Lemmings discover a magic Mayan disc.
82c	4c	"Every Which Way" "(Dans tous les sens)"	Alexis De Jesus Costa; Timothée Mironneau	Célestine Jacquel-Plays; Victor Moulin; Cédric Lachenaud	Agathe Marmion	May 20, 2024	N/A
As they fight over the last jar of chocolate spread, Grizzy and the Lemmings accidentally send it flying deep into the jungle. They both set out in search for the jar, but in a forest that dense, it's an impossible mission.
83a	5a	"Cabin in the Moon" "(Cabane dans la lune)"	Alexis De Jesus Costa; Timothée Mironneau	Josselin Charier; Antoine Rodelet; Victor Moulin; Célestine Jacquel-Plays; Alexis De Jesus Costa	Charlotte Chtati	May 21, 2024	N/A
Just as Grizzy is about to go to bed, he ousts the Lemmings who are holding a surprise party in the cabin. The Lemmings land in a Mayan Temple devoted to the moon. While toying with an ancestral console.
83b	5b	"Grizzy Academy" "(Grizzy académie)"	Alexis De Jesus Costa	Josselin Charier; Antoine Rodelet; Célestine Jacquel-Plays; Alexis De Jesus Costa	Laura Pannetier; Charlotte Chtati	May 22, 2024	N/A
Grizzy does his best to get rid of the Lemmings and enjoy some peace and quiet in the cabin, but each time they come back with a new even more-disturbing activity. He sees some penguins marching in a perfectly disciplined line.
83c	5c	"Well Deserved" "(Biens mérités)"	Camille Scarella	Josselin Charier; Antoine Rodelet; Célestine Jacquel-Plays; Victor Moulin; Camille Scarella	Timothée Mironneau	May 23, 2024	N/A
Grizzy and the Lemmings fight once again and cause an accident with Santa Claus' sled. The Lemmings rush to the crash site and get their hands on Santa's magic bag. While Grizzy is tidying up the cabin after their fight.
84a	6a	"Program on Demand" "(Programme à la demande)"	Alexis De Jesus Costa	Josselin Charier; Antoine Rodelet; Célestine Jacquel-Plays; Alexis De Jesus Costa; Erwan Nosal	Timothée Mironneau	May 26, 2024	N/A
Grizzy and the Lemmings do not agree on which program to watch on TV. Grizzy confiscates the remote-control device. He thinks he's won the battle, but the Lemmings find another one at the research station.
84b	6b	"Frosty Cup" "(Coupe givrée)"	Camille Scarella	Josselin Charier; Antoine Rodelet; Victor Moulin; Célestine Jacquel-Plays	Timothée Mironneau	May 27, 2024	N/A
The Lemmings have a blast racing down the ice slope in competition with the stuffed Bear-Ranger and manage to win each time. Grizzy cannot stand seeing his avatar humiliated and he decides to enter the competition to help him.
84c	6c	"Choco Granito" "(Choco Granito)"	Alexis De Jesus Costa	Josselin Charier; Antoine Rodelet; Célestine Jacquel-Plays; Erwan Nosal	Cédric Byll	May 28, 2024	N/A
Grizzy watches the Lemmings shave ice from the icefield and whip it into granita, but the result is flavorless. He decides to make granita in an empty jar of Yummy so that the chocolate left over will flavor the dessert.
85a	7a	"Quick Meal" "(Boulottage express)"	Camille Scarella	Josselin Charier; Antoine Rodelet; Célestine Jacquel-Plays; Camille Scarella; Erwan Nosal	Cédric Byll	May 29, 2024	N/A
Grizzy and the Lemmings are starving for their reserves are depleted and their fishing has been unsuccessful. Fortunately, a truck delivers a crate of edibles to the research station that contains compact food cubes.
85b	7b	"Digital Taming" "(Dressage digital)"	Alexis De Jesus Costa; Arthur Moncla	Cédric Lachenaud; Célestine Jacquel-Plays; Victor Moulin	Estelle Yven	May 30, 2024	N/A
The Lemmings pace around the log cabin searching for virtual animals to capture with their tablet game. Annoyed by their behavior, Grizzy throws them outside. Determined to continue playing, the Lemmings trick the bear.
85c	7c	"Glacial Carrot" "(Carotte glacière)"	Camille Scarella	Célestine Jacquel-Plays; Cédric Lachenaud; Camille Scarella	Jerôme Fardini	June 2, 2024	N/A
A snowstorm rips the solar panels off the log cabin and Grizzy can no longer watch TV or enjoy the comforts of home! But he has a brilliant idea. He produces electricity by making a caribou run on a treadmill.
86a	8a	"Evil Spirit" "(Mauvais esprit)"	Alexis De Jesus Costa; Timothée Mironneau	Josselin Charier; Antoine Rodelet; Victor Moulin	Charlotte Chtati	June 3, 2024	N/A
Grizzy discovers in shock that the TV has been replaced with a trompe-l'oeil image. Furious, he flushes the Lemmings out of their hiding place where they'd hoped to watch their favorite cartoon in peace and propels them
86b	8b	"Sounds and Visions" "(Sons et visions)"	Alexis De Jesus Costa; Arthur Moncla	Josselin Charier; Antoine Rodelet; Victor Moulin; Erwan Norsal	Timothée Mironneau	June 4, 2024	N/A
Not easy to enjoy a DVD about salmon when the Lemmings are having a disco party right there. Grizzy sends them packing with such force that they land at the research station, where they discover a state- of-the-art U.V. cabin.
86c	8c	"Iced Grizzy" "(Grizzy des glaces)"	Camille Scarella	Célestine Jacquel-Plays; Cédric Lachenaud; Camille Scarella	Florian Guivarch	June 5, 2024	N/A
The Lemmings have fun destroying ice towers. When Grizzy sees them, it inspires him to sculpt statues of himself. The Lemmings cannot resist the temptation to destroy the statues of Grizzy, who does everything to protect them.
87a	9a	"Yummy Indigestion" "(Indigestion de stock)"	Alexis De Jesus Costa; Timothée Mironneau	Josselin Charier; Antoine Rodelet; Victor Moulin; Alexis De Jesus Costa	Ida Pulicani	June 6, 2024	N/A
A container adrift along the icefield will change the lives of Grizzy and the Lemmings: it's an inexhaustible stock of chocolate spread! There is so much, that for the first time the enemies have no need to fight over the treat.
87b	9b	"Yeti Cabin" "(Cabane à yéti)"	Camille Scarella	Josselin Charier; Antoine Rodelet; Victor Moulin; Camille Scarella	Estelle Yven	June 9, 2024	N/A
Grizzy uses a fire extinguisher to chase the Lemmings from the living room so that he can take a nap, but the gadget accidentally flies out the window. It lands at the top of an ice cliff, and the peak of the cliff topples.
87c	9c	"Nutty Family" "(Famille à la noix)"	Camille Scarella	Josselin Charier; Antoine Rodelet; Victor Moulin; Camille Scarella	Charlotte Chtati	July 22, 2024	N/A
Grizzy and the Lemmings are bored; a coconut rolls over to Grizzy's feet, pulling him out of his state of torpor.
88a	10a	"Badly Sprained Bear" "(Ours mal foulé)"	Alexis De Jesus Costa; Timothée Mironneau	Josselin Charier; Antoine Rodelet; Victor Moulin; Alexis De Jesus Costa	Roland Sé	July 22, 2024	N/A
While bickering with the Lemmings over control of the TV, Grizzy sees an illustration that gives him an idea; in a medical book, a person whose leg is in a cast is being served dinner in front of a TV.
88b	10b	"Winning Tokens" "(Bons jetons)"	Camille Scarella	Josselin Charier; Antoine Rodelet; Célestine Jacquel-Plays; Camille Scarella	Guillaume Bracciali	July 23, 2024	N/A
The Lemmings set up a mini fair, but Grizzy steals the Lemmings' tickets.
88c	10c	"Game of Marbles" "(Bille en tête)"	Alexis De Jesus Costa; Timothée Mironneau	Célestine Jacquel-Plays; Cédric Lachenaud; Alexis De Jesus Costa	Estelle Yven	July 23, 2024	N/A
The Lemmings discover that oysters can make pearls almost instantaneously.
89a	11a	"Five-Star Bowl" "(Bocal 5 étoiles)"	Camille Scarella	Josselin Charier; Antoine Rodelet; Célestine Jacquel-Plays; Erwan Nosal	Roland Sé	July 24, 2024	N/A
Grizzy exchanges his indifferent fish with the Lemmings' affectionate and lively fish.
89b	11b	"Lost Object" "(Objet perdu)"	Alexis De Jesus Costa; Timothée Mironneau	Célestine Jacquel-Plays; Cédric Lachenaud; Alexis De Jesus Costa	Agathe Marmion	July 24, 2024	N/A
The Lemmings use all the cans and tins they can get their hands on to build a beach slide, which annoys Grizzy.
89c	11c	"Crab Crush" "(J'en pince pour toi)"	Camille Scarella	Célestine Jacquel-Plays; Cédric Lachenaud; Camille Scarella	Guillaume Bracciali	July 25, 2024	N/A
The Lemmings take a liking to an endangered crab on the beach and decide to shelter it. They bring it home to a disgruntled Grizzy, who wants to watch TV in peace.
90a	12a	"Pirates in Sight" "(Pirates en vue)"	Alexis De Jesus Costa; Timothée Mironneau	Josselin Charier; Antoine Rodelet; Alexis De Jesus Costa; Erwan Nosal	Timothée Mironneau	July 25, 2024	N/A
The Lemmings play pirates on a beached boat. Grizzy, who is fishing further down, realises that with the Lemmings' boat, he could come closer to a zone that's teeming with fish.
90b	12b	"Crab Basket" "(Panier de crabe)"	Camille Scarella	Josselin Charier; Antoine Rodelet; Victor Moulin; Erwan Nosal	Jerôme Fardini	July 26, 2024	N/A
Grizzy sets sail with his fishing gear, but he has no intention of fishing: it's a scheme to enjoy a jar of Yummy chocolate spread alone in peace. However, the Lemmings sense the subterfuge and sink his boat to get the treat.
90c	12c	"Grizzy's Odyssey" "(L’Odyssée de Grizzy)"	Alexis De Jesus Costa; Timothée Mironneau	Josselin Charier; Antoine Rodelet; Victor Moulin; Alexis De Jesus Costa	Timothée Mironneau	July 26, 2024	N/A
The Lemmings find the cabin upside down and upon closer inspection, it looks like an epic battle took place there. When they discover that Grizzy is missing, the curious Lemmings imagine what could have happened, visualising the most improbable.
91a	13a	"Flying Sands" "(Sables volants)"	Camille Scarella	Josselin Charier; Antoine Rodelet; Camille Scarella; Alexis De Jesus Costa	Jerôme Fardini	July 29, 2024	N/A
Grizzy dreams of drinking some nice coconut milk on the couch, but he first needs to get rid of the Lemmings who are having fun flying through the living room. Next, he must find coconuts that haven't been emptied of their nectar.
91b	13b	"Symphony for Lemmings" "(Symphonie pour lemmings)"	Arthur Moncla	Victor Moulin; Camille Scarella; Erwan Nosal	Charlotte Chtati	July 29, 2024	N/A
Grizzy wants to watch TV in peace; the Lemmings have other plans: they want to have fun playing music with homemade instruments; exasperated by the racket they're making in the garage, Grizzy destroys the instruments.
91c	13c	"Interplanetary Cabin" "(Cabane intersidérale)"	Arthur Moncla	Josselin Charier; Antoine Rodelet; Victor Moulin	Florian Guivarch	July 30, 2024	N/A
Grizzy can't sleep because it's too hot, so he decides to confiscate the fans the Lemmings use to power their fake spaceship. Totally into their Space Opera game, the Lemmings try to repel the alien Grizzy with a laser.
92a	14a	"Ready, Set, Bam!" "(Jeu, set et paf)"	Alexis De Jesus Costa; Timothée Mironneau	Josselin Charier; Antoine Rodelet; Alexis De Jesus Costa; Erwan Nosal	Clémence Liberge	September 16, 2024	N/A
The Lemmings find a racket game linked to a prize distributor on a petrol station parking lot.
92b	14b	"Termitator" "(Termitator)"	Camille Scarella	Josselin Charier; Antoine Rodelet; Alexis De Jesus Costa; Camille Scarella; Erwan Nosal	Estelle Yven	September 16, 2024	N/A
The Lemmings adopt a cute insect that eats wood, but the cabin is also made of wood.
92c	14c	"Dad Despite Himself" "(Papa malgré lui)"	Arthur Moncla	Josselin Charier; Antoine Rodelet; Victor Moulin; Alexis De Jesus Costa	Florian Guivarch	September 17, 2024	N/A
Grizzy feels too hot and proposes an exchange to the Lemmings: their ventilator, which they use to propel their skateboard in the air, for a baby ostrich Grizzy found outside the cabin that can tow them.
93a	15a	"Illuminated Lemmings" "(Lemmings illuminés)"	Alexis De Jesus Costa; Timothée Mironneau	Josselin Charier; Antoine Rodelet; Alexis De Jesus Costa; Erwan Nosal	Agathe Marmion	September 17, 2024	N/A
Grizzy has played for too many hours on the console. His eyes are so fatigued that he cannot stand a single ray of light. The Lemmings choose this very moment to throw a big birthday party with as many lights as possible.
93b	15b	"Hide-and-Seek Lemmings" "(Cache-cache lemmings)"	Camille Scarella	Josselin Charier; Antoine Rodelet; Alexis De Jesus Costa; Camille Scarella	Charlotte Chtati	September 18, 2024	N/A
Grizzy watches the Lemmings play hide-and-seek and cannot refrain from sabotaging their game by revealing their hiding places. The Lemmings challenge him to play against them, and the two sides then try to outdo each other in cunning and trickery.
93c	15c	"Nocturnal Din" "(Tapage de nocturnes)"	Arthur Moncla	Camille Scarella; Célestine Jacquel-Plays; Erwan Nosal	Estelle Yven	September 18, 2024	N/A
The Lemmings have organized a mega party at the cabin. This is obviously not to Grizzy's liking and the bear throws them out. The Lemmings discover a cave where the party is even more fun, but their ruckus drives out the bats.
94a	16a	"A Love for Fridges" "(Un amour de frigo)"	Alexis De Jesus Costa; Timothée Mironneau	Camille Scarella; Célestine Jacquel-Plays; Erwan Nosal	Guillaume Bracciali	September 19, 2024	N/A
The Lemmings activate the air conditioner's AI, causing it to fall in love with the fridge.
94b	16b	"Bear Family" "(Famille d'ours)"	Camille Scarella	Josselin Charier; Antoine Rodelet; Camille Scarella; Erwan Nosal	Clémence Liberge	September 19, 2024	N/A
Grizzy finds a white bear that fell out of a zoo's refrigerated truck.
94c	16c	"The Ten Plagues of Grizzy" "(Les dix plaies de grizzy)"	Alexis De Jesus Costa; Timothée Mironneau	Josselin Charier; Antoine Rodelet; Alexis De Jesus Costa; Erwan Nosal	Estelle Yven	September 20, 2024	N/A
The Lemmings' hard rock concert is drives Grizzy mad; after kicking them out, Grizzy requisitions their ghetto blaster and listens to a relaxation cassette to calm down; the Lemmings discover an ancestral tree that casts maledictions.
95a	17a	"Sandbox Games" "(Jeux de bac à sable)"	Camille Scarella	Josselin Charier; Antoine Rodelet; Camille Scarella; Erwan Nosal	Charlotte Chtati	September 20, 2024	N/A
Taking inspiration from a magazine, Grizzy decides to redo the cabin's interior design; to make sure everything is perfect, he ousts the Lemmings and their electric train; the Lemmings discover an underground futuristic premises.
95b	17b	"Chocolate Deposit" "(Gisement chocolaté)"	Alexis De Jesus Costa; Timothée Mironneau	Josselin Charier; Antoine Rodelet; Erwan Nosal; Victor Moulin; Alexis De Jesus Costa	Guillaume Bracciali	September 23, 2024	N/A
The Lemmings find a magic stick that functions as a Yummy divining rod, but Grizzy steals their stick and finds a Yummy deposit in the savannah. To take control over Grizzy's discovery, the Lemmings set a trap to draw the bear.
95c	17c	"Firefly Party" "(Luciole party)"	Camille Scarella	Josselin Charier; Antoine Rodelet; Erwan Nosal; Camille Scarella; Cédric Lachenaud	Agathe Marmion	September 23, 2024	N/A
An eclipse prevents the solar panels from supplying the cabin with electricity and Grizzy is disgruntled because he can't watch TV.
96a	18a	"Keyring Cabin" "(Cabane porte-clés)"	Arthur Moncla	Josselin Charier; Antoine Rodelet; Victor Moulin	Florian Guivarch	September 24, 2024	N/A
The Lemmings recover a jar of Yummy from an automatic distributor. However, before they can enjoy it, Grizzy confiscates the treat. In exchange, he leaves them the key ring that came as a gift.
96b	18b	"Great Wall Disco" "(Muraille disco)"	Arthur Moncla	Célestine Jacquel-Plays; Camille Scarella; Erwan Nosal	Agathe Marmion	November 11, 2024	N/A
Grizzy is jealous of the Lemmings' new game: an interactive dance mat connected to the TV where the idea is to jump around and perform dance sequences. Later, Grizzy and the Lemmings end up discovering a hidden mechanism on the Great Wall of China.
96c	18c	"Choco Noodles" "(Choco-nouilles)"	Alexis De Jesus Costa; Timothée Mironneau	Célestine Jacquel-Plays; Alexis De Jesus Costa; Erwan Nosal	Clémence Liberge	November 11, 2024	N/A
While fighting over a jar of Yummy chocolate spread, the jar is destroyed. So Grizzy discovers an ingenious way to recover the remains of another Yummy jar, using instant Chinese noodles.
97a	19a	"Tough Cookie" "(Durs à cuire)"	Arthur Moncla	Josselin Charier; Antoine Rodelet; Erwan Nosal; Alexis De Jesus Costa	Roland Sé	November 12, 2024	N/A
Grizzy and the Lemmings, who are both starving, discover a temple dedicated to an ancestral brioche recipe. To make it, you must gather three golden ingredients and place them on the altar so that a perfect brioche is cooked.
97b	19b	"Artificial Intelligence, Natural Idiocy" "(Intelligence artificielle, bêtise naturelle)"	Arthur Moncla	Josselin Charier; Antoine Rodelet; Alexis De Jesus Costa; Arthur Moncla	Roland Sé	November 12, 2024	N/A
An AI accidentally connects to Grizzy's stuffed teddy bear, which comes to life.
97c	19c	"All Out for Silk" "(Chacun pour soie)"	Alexis de Jesus Costa; Timothée Mironneau	Josselin Charier; Antoine Rodelet; Célestine Jacquel-Plays; Alexis de Jesus Costa	Charlotte Chtati	November 13, 2024	N/A
Grizzy and the Lemmings fight over a large silkworm that produces a very soft but strong thread.
98a	20a	"Hello Grizzy? Here Lemmings!" "(Allo Grizzy ? Ici Lemmings !)"	Arthur Moncla	Josselin Charier; Antoine Rodelet; Victor Moulin; Camille Scarella	Guillaume Bracciali	November 13, 2024	N/A
The Lemmings find a crate of cell phones: there's one for everyone; but before being able to play with their new toys, they need to charge the batteries; this operation uses all the electricity stored in the cabin's solar battery.
98b	20b	"Grasshopper Bounty" "(Criquet d'abondance)"	Camille Scarella	Josselin Charier; Antoine Rodelet; Célestine Jacquel-Plays; Camille Scarella	Agathe Marmion	November 14, 2024	N/A
The Lemmings catch a grasshopper that can give anyone whatever their heart desires in abundance.
98c	20c	"Sound and Light" "(Bruit et lumière)"	Alexis De Jesus Costa; Timothée Mironneau	Josselin Charier; Antoine Rodelet; Erwan Nosal; Célestine Jacquel-Plays; Alexis De Jesus Costa	Clémence Liberge	November 14, 2024	N/A
The Lemmings discover a new passion: magic Chinese lanterns that they use for sound and light performances; Grizzy is not very enthusiastic about this new electric activity which keeps him from sleeping.
99a	21a	"Hero Despite Himself" "(Héros malgré lui)"	Arthur Moncla	Josselin Charier; Antoine Rodelet; Victor Moulin; Arthur Moncla	Florian Guivarch	November 15, 2024	N/A
The Lemmings lay hands on an ancient console that lets one play life-sized games in the real world; the console emits magical streams of energy that randomly pick avatars to confront one another; Grizzy is chosen as the hero.
99b	21b	"Mask Time" "(Haut les masques !)"	Arthur Moncla	Josselin Charier; Antoine Rodelet; Erwan Nosal; Victor Moulin; Arthur Moncla	Roland Sé	November 15, 2024	N/A
The Lemmings find a mask that terrifies anyone who looks at it.
99c	21c	"Drawer Puzzles" "(Problème à tiroirs)"	Arthur Moncla	Josselin Charier; Antoine Rodelet; Célestine Jacquel-Plays; Alexis De Jesus Costa	Florian Guivarch	November 18, 2024	N/A
Grizzy and the Lemmings crack the codex system of a mysterious box and are sucked into it.
100a	22a	"Double Trouble" "(Doubles ennuis)"	Arthur Moncla	Josselin Charier; Antoine Rodelet; Camille Scarella; Arthur Moncla	Clémence Liberge	November 18, 2024	N/A
Grizzy finds a home cinema screen that transforms his favourite documentary film into a different light and sound experience, but the Lemmings' fiesta ruins his pleasure.
100b	22b	"Happy Birthday Grizzy!" "(Happy birthday Grizzy !)"	Camille Scarella	Josselin Charier; Antoine Rodelet; Erwan Nosal; Victor Moulin; Alexis De Jesus Costa	Timothée Mironneau	November 19, 2024	N/A
Grizzy has anticipated everything for his birthday and plans on spending a peaceful day in the cabin doing his favorite activities; but when the lemmings find out it's Grizzy's birthday, they devise other plans.
100c	22c	"War of the Lambs" "(La guerre des moutons)"	Camille Scarella	Josselin Charier; Antonie Rodelet; Camille Scarella; Erwan Nosal	Charlotte Chtati	January 20, 2025	N/A
Grizzy has adopted a lamb and wants to give it a proper education; Grizzy is forced to play policeman and lock the Lemmings in one of the tower rooms.
101a	23a	"Ultra Wool" "(Laine plus ultra)"	Timothée Mironneau	Josselin Charier; Antonie Rodelet; Erwan Nosal; Camille Scarella; Alexis De Jesus Costa	Guillaume Bracciali	January 20, 2025	N/A
The Lemmings have fun jumping up and down on the wool of the sheep; the game turns into a nightmare when Grizzy's hindquarters accidentally get shaved because of the Lemmings.
101b	23b	"Lemming Hoods" "(Lemmings des bois)"	Arthur Moncla	Josselin Charier; Antonie Rodelet; Célestine Jacquel-Plays; Victor Moulin	Clémence Liberge	January 21, 2025	N/A
Grizzy finds a crate of Yummy flavored jelly; in order to enjoy the treat alone, he throws the Lemmings into the dungeon; the Lemmings discover a book on Robin Hood and use it as inspiration to free themselves.
101c	23c	"Good Fairy, Bad Fairy" "(Bonne fée, mauvaise fée)"	Camille Scarella	Josselin Charier; Antonie Rodelet; Camille Scarella; Erwan Nosal	Edouard Yven	January 21, 2025	N/A
The Lemmings organize a magic show in the cabin living room but Grizzy wants to get comfy and watch TV; he evicts the Lemmings who find a strange alignment of menhirs in the Scottish moor by standing in a certain spot.
102a	24a	"Odd Twists" "(Drôle de rebondissement)"	Arthur Moncla	Josselin Charier; Antonie Rodelet; Erwan Nosal; Camille Scarella; Célestine Jacquel-Plays	Guillaume Bracciali	January 22, 2025	N/A
Grizzy does not know how to put an end to the Lemmings' new ball game.
102b	24b	"The Battle of the Sacred Crown" "(La bataille de la couronne sacrée)"	Camille Scarella	Camille Scarella; Alexis De Jesus Costa; Erwan Nosal	Florian Guivarch	January 22, 2025	N/A
Grizzy and the Lemmings are fighting over a crown.
102c	24c	"Were-Lemming" "(Lemming Garou)"	Camille Scarella	Josselin Charier; Antonie Rodelet; Erwan Nosal; Camille Scarella; Cédric Lachenaud	Agathe Marmion	January 23, 2025	N/A
After touching a mysterious tooth, a lemming turns into a were-lemming!
103a	25a	"Hold-Up, Hens and Yummy" "(Braquage, poule et yummy)"	Camille Scarella	Josselin Charier; Antonie Rodelet; Erwan Nosal; Camille Scarella; Alexis De Jesus Costa	Roland Sé	January 23, 2025	N/A
Grizzy uses a hen to protect some Yummy jars from the Lemmings.
103b	25b	"Ever Higher" "(Toujours plus haut)"	Timothée Mironneau	Josselin Charier; Antonie Rodelet; Alexis De Jesus Costa; Erwan Nosal	Edouard Yven	January 24, 2025	N/A
Grizzy and the Lemmings fight over a jar of jelly that gets stuck in a high-up spot.
103c	25c	"Witchcraft Game" "(Sorcellerie du jeu)"	Cédric Lachenaud	Josselin Charier; Antonie Rodelet; Victor Moulin; Cédric Lachenaud	Agathe Marmion	January 24, 2025	N/A
Grizzy and the Lemmings play a game; it's the Lemmings Knights vs. the Bear Magician.
104a	26a	"Monstrous Costumes" "(Monstrueux déguisements)"	Camille Scarella	Josselin Charier; Antonie Rodelet; Erwan Nosal; Célestine Jacquel-Plays; Camille Scarella	Charlotte Chtati	January 27, 2025	N/A
To celebrate Halloween, the Lemmings disguise themselves and decorate the cabin.
104b	26b	"The Crime Was Almost Yummy" "(Le crime était presque Yummy)"	Camille Scarella	Josselin Charier; Antonie Rodelet; Erwan Nosal; Camille Scarella; Cédric Lachenaud	Guillaume Bracciali	January 27, 2025	N/A
Grizzy's sample of Yummy is mysteriously crushed, but who is the culprit?
104c	26c	"Cabin, My Love" "(Cabane, mon amour)"	Arthur Moncla	Josselin Charier; Antonie Rodelet; Erwan Nosal; Victor Moulin; Arthur Moncla	Florian Guivarch	January 28, 2025	N/A
The cabin comes to life and wants to return to Canada without Grizzy or the Lemmings. Note: In this episode the scenes are shown on the cabin's TV screen, which were from the intro, and the other episodes like "Fireworks Cabin", "Outboard Cabin", "Cabin On Ice", "Super-Voltaic Cabin" and "Unpractical Cabin". In the end of the episode , Grizzy and The Lemmings along with the cabin, return to Canada, after 156 episodes (Season 3 & 4) of the World Tour where the last episode ("Hocus Pocus Lemmingus") of season 2 was ended. This is the only time in the whole series to have Grizzy and the Lemmings getting a happy ending unlike every season of them with bad endings.

== Shorts (2019–20) ==
External videos
- 1000 000 Subscribers Celebration
- Covid-19 Short

Title	Written by	Original release date
"Grizzy & the Lemmings are Celebrating Their 1,000,000 Subscribers!"	Unknown	September 4, 2019
This episode takes place in a bare white room. Grizzy is taking a nap until the Lemmings use ropes to tie him up. He can't move. The Lemmings eject him from the couch into an upright position. A Lemming with a cap tells other Lemmings to form shapes of 0. Another Lemming comes with a sign that reads "SUBSCRIBERS!!!". The Lemmings and Grizzy, excited to have reached this milestone, dance. Then a screen saying "Thank you all! We are now a family of a million people!" comes up.

A special episode titled "COVID-19 Alert" was aired on March 27, 2020, on the official YouTube channel during the COVID-19 pandemic. This video was created as a warning to children to protect themselves from the Coronavirus disease and to avoid catching it.

Title	Written by	Original release date
"COVID-19 Alert"	Antoine Rodelet; Josselin Charier	March 27, 2020
When Grizzy comes in the cabin, he sees that the Lemmings are standing in a queue but 6' away from each other to eat Yummy XL turn wise. Grizzy comes closer to beat them, but they warn him of the Coronavirus disease and tell him to use social distancing. Grizzy makes a plan and increases the size of his beating stick and throws all of them out. He then starts eating the chocolate spread. But Lemmings again come in the cabin wearing masks and also give a mask to Grizzy. During their fight, the Yummy XL falls down from the cabin and lands on a rock and breaks, much to their dismay.
