= ThermoSpas =

ThermoSpas Hot Tub Products, Inc.
- Founded: 1983; 43 years ago
- Headquarters: Wallingford, Connecticut, U.S.
- Area served: United States
- Products: hot tubs
- Brands: ThermoSpas Hot Tub Products
- Parent: Jacuzzi Group Worldwide
- Website: www.thermospas.com

ThermoSpas is an American brand of hot tubs, headquartered in Wallingford, Connecticut. Founded in 1983, it was purchased by a subsidiary of Jacuzzi Group Worldwide in 2012 and now operates under the name ThermoSpas Hot Tub Products, Inc.

== History ==
ThermoSpas was founded in 1983 and began in a 30,000 square foot facility in Shelton, Connecticut. It continued to expand and relocated to a 140,000 square foot manufacturing plant a few years later in Wallingford.

ThermoSpas originally sold through hot tub dealers in the mid-1980s. In 1995, the company cut ties with most dealers in favor of a new approach to hot tub sales. The company's business model became unique in the industry. While major hot tub companies sold through independent dealers, ThermoSpas used a direct-to-consumer model and performed everything from the initial site inspection through installation of its tubs. Its best lead system was from infomercials which generated hundreds of thousands of leads for the company.

ThermoSpas ran into financial difficulty in 2008-2009 during the United States recession. It became unable to manage every aspect of its business, reporting $2.6 million in assets with almost $18 million in debt, eventually filing bankruptcy. A subsidiary of Jacuzzi Group Worldwide purchased some of the assets of ThermoSpas, giving ThermoSpas the resources and improved infrastructure to continue it use of the direct-to-consumer business model. Although considered a subsidiary of Jacuzzi Group Worldwide, ThermoSpas operates as an independent company officially named ThermoSpas Hot Tub Products, Inc.

Since its inception, the ThermoSpas has been known for development and use of technology such as a patented control therapy system that allows each person in a hot tub to have a personalized therapeutic experience in addition to various filtration systems that help purify water used in a hot tub.

== Products ==
ThermoSpas sells pre-designed hot tubs as well as personally designed hot tubs for personal use. In addition to personal hot tubs, ThermoSpas is known for healing spas and swim spa trainers. It is also attributed as the first to develop a healing spa specifically for arthritis sufferers, a design that they partnered with the Arthritis Foundation to complete.
