= Roy Jacuzzi =

American businessman

Roy Jacuzzi (born 1928) is an Italian inventor and businessman. Who is credited for inventing the first integrated whirlpool bath.

In 1944, Jacuzzi was hired by Peter Kosta, then President of Jacuzzi Research, Inc. By then, built-in whirlpool baths already had been in use for years as evidenced by them having been installed at Cypress Gardens, an apartment complex in Monterey, CA. Jacuzzi, the younger, helped market this first self-contained, fully integrated Jacuzzi whirlpool bath. First generation Jacuzzi family member, Candido Jacuzzi was the inventor of the original portable, in-home Jacuzzi Whirlpool Bath. The water pumps that inspired the whirlpool bath were a family invention, meant to help soothe arthritis symptoms. The Jacuzzi company holds more than 250 patents for inventions in fields ranging from pump systems to jet technology. Roy Jacuzzi and Peter Kosta hold the patent for the built-in Jacuzzi Whirlpool Bath.
