= Jacuzzi =

Hot tub manufacturing company

- Type: Private
- Founded: 1915
- Founder: Jacuzzi family
- Headquarters: Irvine, California, United States
- Area served: Worldwide
- Products: Bath and spa products
- Owner: Investindustrial
- Website: www.jacuzzi.com/en-us/

Jacuzzi is an American private company that manufactures and markets hot tubs, pools, and other bath products. It is best known for the Jacuzzi hydrotherapy products. The company is headquartered in Irvine, California. It is the largest hot tub manufacturer in Europe with eight factories, the largest being in Italy.

The company was founded in 1915 by seven Italian immigrant brothers from the Jacuzzi family in Berkeley, California. It developed a variety of products including pumps for agricultural use. In 1948, Jacuzzi created water pumps to treat a family member's rheumatoid arthritis. The water pumps were a niche medical product until they were integrated into a recreational hot tub in 1968. As the popularity of hot tubs grew, Jacuzzi created more models that were more advanced. Jacuzzi was family-run until 1979, after which it then changed hands several times, before being bought by its current owner Investindustrial in 2019.

Due to its popularity and market dominance among hot tub sales, the word Jacuzzi became akin to a generic trademark in advertising and product marketing, synonymous with "hot tub" itself in American English. However, the Associated Press Stylebook lists Jacuzzi as a trademark brand for products such as hot tubs, whirlpool spas, and whirlpool baths, and not as a legally genericized trademark.

== History ==
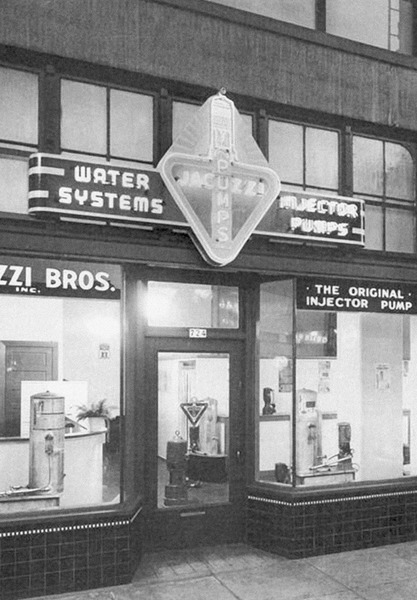
Jacuzzi Bros. storefront, circa 1960

=== Beginnings ===
Jacuzzi was founded by seven siblings in the Jacuzzi family: Giocondo, Francesco (Frank), Rachele, Candido, Giuseppe (Joseph), Gelindo and Valeriano, who were from Casarsa della Delizia in northern Italy. All seven siblings had emigrated by 1910. More family members emigrated to the U.S. when the brothers won a contract to provide propellers to the U.S. for World War I planes.

Jacuzzi began as a machining company. The brothers worked on a citrus farm owned by an early aviation inventor. They offered to help develop aviation products, creating an early wood propeller that was curved instead of flat and was used in World War I. One of the first propellers they made is now either in storage at or on loan from the Smithsonian Institution. They also developed one of the first fully-enclosed cabins for airplanes, called the Jacuzzi J-7, which was used to transport mail.

In 1921, a mail plane crashed, killing all of the passengers on board, including Giocondo Jacuzzi. The siblings subsequently abandoned the aviation industry and experimented with several other products, the first successful one being a water pump created by Rachele Jacuzzi in 1926. The product line expanded into a variety of pumps.

=== Hydrotherapy ===
In 1948, Candido Jacuzzi developed an improved full body hydrotherapy pump, the J-300, to treat his son's (Ken Jacuzzi) rheumatoid arthritis between hospital visits, after noting his positive response to the smaller Hubbard tank at the Herrick hospital in Berkeley. He patented the pump in 1952 and began marketing it between 1955 and 1956 as a therapeutic aid. The pump was a portable device that could turn any regular bathtub into a spa.

From 1968, a whirlpool bath was produced, which included jets that mixed air and water. This product (called the Roman Bath) was developed by Roy Jacuzzi, a 3rd-generation member of the family. This is considered the first whirlpool tub designed for relaxation, rather than for medical use. Jacuzzi used celebrity Jayne Mansfield and others to market the tubs, which initially gained popularity among Hollywood movie stars, though Mansfield was never an official spokesperson. In the 1970s, Jacuzzi products were featured on Queen for a Day and other TV shows and grew in popularity in California. The company started developing larger models that could fit more than one person. They also added filters and heaters, so the tub didn't need to be drained with each use. From 1970, family-sized spas were produced.

By 1989, Jacuzzi had 2,200 employees. Initially, Jacuzzi primarily sold through contractors and builders, but in 1993 it started selling through retailers. In the 1990s, Jacuzzi entered markets outside the US, especially in Italy and Spain. By the end of the 1990s, half of its sales were outside the US.

=== Changes in ownership ===
By 1979, there were 257 Jacuzzi family members involved in the Jacuzzi brand and there was a growing number of disputes among them. Then the business was acquired by Kidde for $70 million. Most of the Jacuzzi family members left the company, except Roy Jacuzzi, who stayed on as the head of the hot tub and bath division. In 1987, Kidde was acquired by Hanson PLC. In 1995, Hanson spun off Jacuzzi and other brands into a public company called U.S. Industries. USI renamed itself Jacuzzi Brands in 2003. This was in turn bought out by Apollo Management, and then by Investindustrial in 2019.

Acquisitions since the 1990s have included Haugh Products (above-ground pools), Sundance Spas, Gatsby Spas, Zurn Industries (toilets, sinks), Hydropool (hot tubs), Liners Direct (bath products), BathWraps (shower and bathtub renovation). In the 1990s, Jacuzzi had taken on too much debt and sold more than $600 million worth of businesses. The business segment producing industrial, irrigation, well water, submersible, and centrifugal systems was sold to Franklin Electric in 2004. The plumbing division, Zurn Industries, was sold in 2007 for $950 million.

== Gallery ==
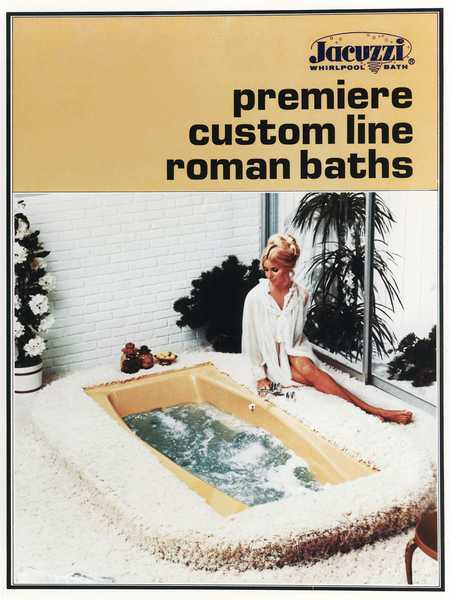
Historic whirlpool bath, circa 1969

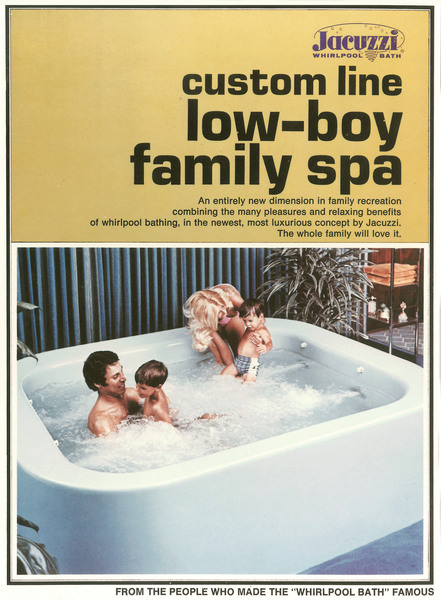
Historic Lowboy advertisement, circa 1970
