= Derrière le miroir =

French art magazine

DERRIÈRE LE MIROIR
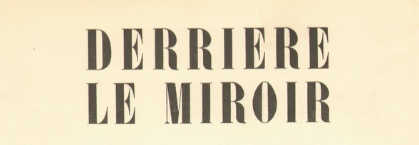
- Editor: Aimé Maeght
- Categories: Art magazine
- Frequency: Variable (4 to 7 issues per year)
- Publisher: Aimé Maeght
- Founder: Aimé Maeght
- Founded: 1946; 80 years ago
- First issue: December 1946
- Final issue: August 1982
- Company: Maeght Editeur
- Country: France
- Based in: Paris
- Language: French
- Website: Maeght
- ISSN: 0011-9113

Derrière le Miroir (French pronunciation: [dɛʁjɛʁ lə miʁwaʁ], lit. 'Behind the Mirror') is a French art magazine created in 1946 and published until 1982. Art galleries, auction houses and booksellers often refer to this art magazine simply as D.L.M. or DLM. Aimé Maeght is the founder, editor and publisher.

== History ==
In October 1945, the French art dealer Aimé Maeght opened his art gallery at 13 Rue de Téhéran in Paris. The opening of the gallery coincided with the end of World War II and the return of a number of exiled artists back to France. The magazine was created in October 1946 (n°1) and published without interruption until 1982 (n°253). Its original articles and illustrations (mainly original color lithographs by the gallery artists) were famous at the time. The magazine covered only the artists exhibited by Maeght gallery either through personal or group exhibitions. Among them are: Henri-Georges Adam, Pierre Alechinsky, Bacon, Jean Bazaine, Georges Braque, Pol Bury, Alexander Calder, Marc Chagall, Roger Chastel, Eduardo Chillida, Alberto Giacometti, Vassily Kandinsky, Ellsworth Kelly, Fernand Léger, Lindner, Henri Matisse, Joan Miró, Jacques Monory, Pablo Palazuelo, Paul Rebeyrolle, Jean-Paul Riopelle, Saul Steinberg, Pierre Tal-Coat, Antoni Tàpies, Raoul Ubac, Bram van Velde.

Among the authors publishing essays and poems are (in alphabetical order): Guillaume Apollinaire, Marcel Arland, André Balthazar, Yves Bonnefoy, André du Bouchet, André Breton, Joan Brossa, Jean Cassou, René Char, Pierre Descargues, Jacques Dupin, Georges Duthuit, Frank Elgar, Claude Esteban, Charles Estienne, André Frénaud, Stanislas Fumet, Jean Grenier, Marcel Jouhandeau, Jacques Kober, Michel Leiris, Georges Limbour, Henri Maldiney, Jean Paulhan, Gaëtan Picon, Francis Ponge, Jacques Prévert, Raymond Queneau, Pierre Reverdy, Michel Seuphor, Jean Tardieu, Lionello Venturi, Pierre Volboudt, Christian Zervos.

Following the death of Aimé Maeght in September 1981, the Derrière le Miroir n°250 was designed as a tribute to the work of Aimé Maeght and his wife Marguerite (who had died before him in 1977). This special 112-pages issue was named "Hommage à Aimé et Marguerite Maeght" and was intended to be the last one. As it summarised all contents of the previous issues, it was finalised only in August 1982. In the meantime, n° 251 to 253 (the very last number) were published respectively in February, May and June 1982.

== Numbering system and identification ==
Although the issue numbers go from n°1 to n°253, only 200 issues were published. From the 200 issues, 157 were single issues, 33 are double-issue (n°11–12 Bram et Geer van Velde, n°14–15 Joan Miró,...) and 10 triple issues (n°36-37-38 Sur quatre murs, n°57-58-59 Miró,...)

For the issue identification:

- The first 6 issues (December 1946 to November 1947) show no printed issue number.
- The issue n° 7 (February 1948) is the first one showing an issue number (on the cover page).
- From issue n°23 (October–November 1949), the issue numbers appear in the internal pages (mainly on the back side of the last cover).
- All issues from n°213 (March 1975) to the last one (n°253) display an ISBN.

== List of the 200 issues with titles (per year) ==
=== Year 1946–1947: n°1 → n°6 ===
- n°1 Le noir est une couleur
- n°2 Sur 4 murs (On Four Walls)
- n°3 Rigaud
- n°4 G. Braque
- n°5 Les mains éblouies (The Dazzled Hands)
- n°6 Baya

=== Year 1948: n°7 → n°14–15 ===
- n°7 Jean Villeri
- n°8 Jean Peyrissac
- n°9 Pierre Pallut
- n°10 E. Béothy
- n°11–12 Bram et Geer van Velde
- n°13 Germaine Richier
- n°14–15 Joan Miró

=== Year 1949: n°16 → n°24 ===
- n°16 Hans Hofmann
- n°17 Paul Eluard – Roger Chastel
- n°18 Chauvin
- n°19 Kurt Seligmann
- n°20–21 L'art abstrait (The Abstract Art)
- n°22 Les mains éblouies (The Dazzled Hands)
- n°23 Jean Bazaine
- n°24 Adam

=== Year 1950: n°25–26 → n°34 ===
- n°25–26 G. Braque
- n°27–28 Chagall
- n°29–30 Miró
- n°31 Calder
- n°32 Les mains éblouies (The Dazzled Hands)
- n°33 Arp
- n°34 Raoul Ubac

=== Year 1951: n°35 → n°42 ===
- n°35 Hirshfield
- n°36-37-38 Sur quatre murs (On Four Walls)
- n°39–40 Alberto Giacometti
- n°41 Tendance: Germain-Kelly-Palazuelo-S.Poliakoff
- n°42 Kandinsky 1900–1910

=== Year 1952: n°43 → n°51 ===
- n°43 Bram van Velde
- n°44–45 Chagall
- n°46–47 Matisse
- n°48–49 G. Braque
- n°50 Tendance Octobre 1952 (Trends October 1952)
- n°51 Geer van Velde

=== Year 1953: n°52 → n°60–61 ===
- n°52 Lam
- n°53–54 Steinberg 1953
- n°55–56 Bazaine
- n°57-58-59 Miró
- n°60–61 Kandinsky

=== Year 1954: n°62–63 → n°71–72 ===
- n°62–63 Dessins indiens du Tumuc-Humac (Drawings by the Aboriginal Tumuc-Humac people)
- n°64 Tal-Coat
- n°65 Giacometti
- n°66-67-68 Marc Chagall: Paris
- n°69–70 Calder
- n°71–72 G. Braque

=== Year 1955: n°73 → n°79-80-81 ===
- n°73 Palazuelo 55
- n°74-75-76 Raoul Ubac
- n°77–78 Kandinsky: Période dramatique 1910–1920 (Kandinsky: Dramatic Period: 1910–1920)
- n°79-80-81 F. Léger

=== Year 1956: n°82-83-84 → n°92–93 ===
- n°82-83-84 Tal-Coat
- n°85–86 Braque
- n°87-88-89 Miró – Artigas
- n°90–91 Chillida
- n°92–93 10 ans d'éditions: 1946–1956

=== Year 1957: n°94–95 → n°101-102-103 ===
- n°94–95 Derain
- n°96–97 Bazaine
- n°98 Alberto Giacometti
- n°99–100 Chagall
- n°101-102-103 Kandinsky

=== Year 1958: n°104 → n°111 ===
- n°104 Palazuelo
- n°105–106 Ubac
- n°107-108-109 Sur 4 murs (On Four Walls)
- n°110 Kelly
- n°111 Derain

=== Year 1959: n°112 → n°117 ===
- n°112 Editions Maeght 1958 (Maeght Editions 1958)
- n°113 Calder
- n°114 Tal-Coat
- n°115 G. Braque
- n°116 Fiedler
- n°117 Maeght Editeur 1959 (Maeght Editor 1959)

=== Year 1960: n°118 → n°121–122 ===
- n°118 Kandinsky: 1921–1927
- n°119 Poètes, Peintres Sculpteurs (Poets, Painters, Sculptors)
- n°120 Tal-Coat: Dessins d'Aix 1947–1950 (Tal-Coat: Drawings from his time in Aix-en Provence 1947–1950)
- n°121–122 Maeght Editeur 1960 (Maeght Editor 1959)

=== Year 1961: n°123 → n°130 ===
- n°123 Miró: Céramiques Murales pour Harvard (Miró: The Ceramic Mural for Harvard)
- n°124 Chillida
- n°125–126 Miró
- n°127 Giacometti
- n°128 Miró: Peintures murales (Miró: Wall paintings)
- n°129 F. Fiedler
- n°130 Ubac

=== Year 1962: n°131 → n°135–136 ===
- n°131 Tal-Coat
- n°132 Chagall
- n°133–134 Der Blaue Reiter (The Blue Rider)
- n°135–136 Georges Braque – Pierre Reverdy

=== Year 1963: n°137 → n°141 ===
- n°137 Palazuelo
- n°138 Georges Braque: Papiers collés 1912–1914
- n°139–140 Miró – Artigas
- n°141 Calder

=== Year 1964: n°142 → n°149 ===
- n°142 Ubac
- n°143 Chillida
- n°144-145-146 Hommage à Georges Braque (Homage to Georges Braque)
- n°147 Chagall
- n°148 La Fondation Marguerite et Aimé Maeght à St.Paul (The Marguerite and Aimé Maeght Foundation in Saint-Paul, France)
- n°149 Kelly

=== Year 1965: n°150 → n°155 ===
- n°150 5 peintres et 1 sculpteur (5 painters and 1 sculptor)
- n°151–152 Miró: Cartons
- n°153 Tal-Coat
- n°154 Kandinsky: Bauhaus de Dessau 1927–1933
- n°155 Fondation Maeght

=== Year 1966: n°156 → n°162 ===
- n°156 Calder
- n°157 Steinberg
- n°158–159 La Revue Blanche
- n°160 Riopelle
- n°161 Ubac
- n°162 Francis Bacon

=== Year 1967: n°163 → n°169 ===
- n°163 Rebeyrolle
- n°164–165 Miró: l'oiseau solaire, l'oiseau lunaire, étincelles (Miró: Solar bird, Lunar bird, Sparks)
- n°166 Georges Braque: derniers messages ('Georges Braque: last messages)
- n°167 François Fiedler
- n°168 Tàpies
- n°169 Aquarelles, album femmes, Hai-ku (Watercolours, Portfolio Women, Haiku)

=== Year 1968: n°170 → n°175 ===
- n°170 Bazaine
- n°171 Riopelle
- n°172 Kemény
- n°173 Calder
- n°174 Chillida
- n°175 Tàpies

=== Year 1969: n°176 → n°182 ===
- n°176 Le Yaouanc
- n°177 Rebeyrolle
- n°178 Pol Bury
- n°179 Kandinsky: Période parisienne 1934–1944 (Kandinsky: The Parisien Period 1934–1944)
- n°180 Tàpies
- n°181 Artigas
- n°182 Chagall

=== Year 1970: n°183 → n°189 ===
- n°183 Chillida
- n°184 Palazuelo
- n°185 Riopelle 70
- n°186 Miró: sculptures
- n°187 Rebeyrolle
- n°188 Adami
- n°189 Le Yaouanc

=== Year 1971: n°190 → n°195 ===
- n°190 Calder
- n°191 Pol Bury
- n°192 Steinberg
- n°193–194 Miró: peintures sur papiers, dessins (Miró: paintings on papers, drawings)
- n°195 Maeght éditeur (Maeght Editor)

=== Year 1972: n°196 → n°200 ===
- n°196 Ubac
- n°197 Bazaine
- n°198 Chagall
- n°199 Tal-Coat
- n°200 Tàpies: objets et grands formats (Tàpies: objects and large formats)

=== Year 1973: n°201 → n°206 ===
- n°201 Calder
- n°202 Rebeyrolle
- n°203 Miró
- n°204 Chillida
- n°205 Steinberg 73
- n°206 Adami

=== Year 1974: n°207 → n°211 ===
- n°207 Cinq livres gravés
- n°208 Riopelle 74
- n°209 Pol Bury: sculptures à cordes
- n°210 Tàpies: monotypes
- n°211 Fiedler

=== Year 1975: n°212 → n°216 ===
- n°212 Calder
- n°213 Garache, ISBN 2-85587-002-X
- n°214 Adami, ISBN 2-85587-006-2
- n°215 Bazaine, ISBN 2-85587-011-9
- n°216 Bram van Velde, ISBN 2-85587-013-5

=== Year 1976: n°217 → n°221 ===
- n°217 Monory, ISBN 2-85587-018-6
- n°218 Riopelle 76, ISBN 2-85587-020-8
- n°219 Rebeyrolle: natures mortes et pouvoir, (Rebeyrolle: Still lifes and power), ISBN 2-85587-022-4
- n°220 Adami, ISBN 2-85587-025-9
- n°221 Calder, ISBN 2-85587-026-7

=== Year 1977: n°222 → n°226 ===
- n°222 Garache, ISBN 2-85587-028-3
- n°223 Arakawa, ISBN 2-85587-029-1
- n°224 Steinberg, ISBN 2-85587-033-X
- n°225 Chagall, ISBN 2-85587-037-2
- n°226 Lindner, ISBN 2-85587-038-0

=== Year 1978: n°227 → n°231 ===
- n°227 Monory, ISBN 2-85587-042-9
- n°228 Pol Bury, ISBN 2-85587-046-1
- n°229 Palazuelo, ISBN 2-85587-040-2
- n°230 Gérard Titus-Carmel: suite Narwa, ISBN 2-85587-051-8
- n°231 Miró, ISBN 2-85587-052-6

=== Year 1979: n°232 → n°236 ===
- n°232 Riopelle, ISBN 2-85587-054-2
- n°233 Alberto Giacometti': Les murs de l'atelier et de la chambre (Alberto Giacometti: The Walls from his Studio and from his Bedroom), ISBN 2-85587-056-9
- n°234 Tàpies, ISBN 2-85587-059-3
- n°235 Marc Chagall, ISBN 2-85587-064-X
- n°236 Kienholz, ISBN 2-85587-066-6

=== Year 1980: n°237 → n°242 ===
- n°237 Garache, ISBN 2-85587-068-2
- n°238 Klapheck, ISBN 2-85587-069-0
- n°239 Adami, ISBN 2-85587-071-2
- n°240 Bram van Velde, ISBN 2-85587-078-X
- n°241 Lindner-Steinberg, ISBN 2-85587-079-8
- n°242 Chillida, ISBN 2-85587-080-1

=== Year 1981: n°243 → n°249 ===
- n°243 Gérard Titus-Carmel, ISBN 2-85587-082-8
- n°244 Monory, ISBN 2-85587-083-6
- n°245 Noguchi: granits, basaltes, obsidiennes (Noguchi: granites, basalts, obsidians), ISBN 2-85587-088-7
- n°246 Chagall: lithographies originales (Chagall: Original lithographs), ISBN 2-85587-089-5
- n°247 Alechinsky, ISBN 2-85587-092-5
- n°248 Calder, ISBN 2-85587-094-1
- n°249 Takis, ISBN 2-85587-096-8

=== Year 1982: n°250 → n°253 ===
- n°250 Hommage à Aimé et Marguerite Maeght (Homage to Aimé and Marguerite Maeght), ISBN 2-85587-097-6
- n°251 Ubac, ISBN 2-85587-098-4
- n°252 Arakawa, ISBN 2-85587-103-4
- n°253 Tàpies, ISBN 2-85587-104-2

== Deluxe editions ==
From the 200 issues, 98 were also published in a deluxe edition (in French: "éditions de tête") on heavy paper such as chiffon de la Dore, chiffon de Mandeure, vélin d'Arches, vélin de Lana ou vélin de Rives. The majority of the deluxe editions were signed by the artist on the justification page. The deluxe editions are normally limited to 150 numbered copies (and a few hors commerce), excepting for the following issues:

- n°14–15 Joan Miró: 100 deluxe copies, numbered and signed on the justification page.
- n°66-67-68 Marc Chagall: Paris: 50 deluxe copies, numbered and signed on the justification page.
- n°144-145-146 Hommage à Georges Braque: 350 deluxe copies numbered only.
- n°158–159 Autour de la Revue Blanche, 250 deluxe copies numbered only.
