= Claude Garache =

French artist

- Born: 1929 or 1930; Paris, France
- Known for: Painting, drawing, sculpture, printmaking

Claude Garache (1929-2023) is a French artist. He has worked in painting, sculpture, illustration and engraving. His principal subject is the female nude. Much of his work uses a single colour on a monochrome background, very often blood-red on white.

== Biography ==
Garache was born in Paris on 20 January 1929. Between 1949 and 1959, he studied sculpture and drawing under the sculptor Robert Coutin. He spent time in the studios of Andre Lhote and Fernand Léger, and also visited Alberto Giacometti and worked in the sculpture studio of the École nationale supérieure des Beaux-Arts.. He travelled frequently in the 1950s, in Europe and to the Middle East and the United States. In 1955, he worked as an artistic advisor to Vincente Minnelli during the filming of Lust for Life, his biography of Vincent van Gogh. Garache later made sculptures for L'Année dernière à Marienbad (1961), directed by Alain Resnais.

== Retrospectives ==
- 1966-1982 (oil on canvas), Musée Grobet-Labadié (Marseille), 1983
- 1965-1985 (etchings), Zilkha Gallery (Wesleyan University, Middletown, Connecticut), 1985

== Public collections ==
- Museum of Modern Art, New York, New York City
- Hirshhorn Museum and Sculpture Garden, Washington DC
- Davison Art Center, Wesleyan University, Middletown, Connecticut
- Madison Art Center, Madison, Wisconsin
- Evehjem Museum of Art, Madison, Wisconsin
- Cincinnati Museum
- Musée d’Art Moderne de la Ville de Paris
- Musée national d'art moderne, Paris
- Fondation Maeght, Saint-Paul-de-Vence
- Fonds national d'art contemporain, Paris
- Musée Cantini, Marseille
- Bibliothèque nationale de France, Paris
- Bibliothèque littéraire Jacques-Doucet, Paris
- Musée Jenisch, Vevey, Switzerland
- Bibliothèque nationale suisse, Berne
- Museum Het Rembrandthuis, Amsterdam

== Further reading and listening ==
=== Interviews and lectures ===
- Interview with Valère Bertrand, "Les arts et les gens", France-Culture, Radio France, 20 juillet 1992
- Interview with Alin Avila, "Les arts et les gens", France-Culture, Radio France, 22 novembre 1993
- Florian Rodari, Marie du Bouchet, Alain Madeleine-Perdrillat, Interviews with Claude Garache, Hazan, 2010.
- Yves Bonnefoy, at Wesleyan University, Wesleyan University, Middletown, CT, 31 octobre 1985
- Jacques-Louis Binet, École du Louvre, 10 janvier 2002

=== Books and essays ===
- Dictionary Bénézit, Oxford Press University, 2011
- Jean Starobinski, Claude Garache, Flammarion, 1988
- Jacques Dupin, Garache, Dessins, Paris, Conférence et Adam Biro éditeurs, 1999
- Garache face au modèle (texts of Raoul Ubac, Florian Rodari, Yves Bonnefoy, Philippe Jaccottet, Roger Munier, Emmanuel Laugier, Alain Madeleine-Perdrillat, Jacques Dupin, Anne de Staël, Nicolas Pesquès, François Trémolières, Michael Edwards, Jean Starobinski, John E. Jackson, Pierre Alain Tâche), La Dogana (Genève), 2006
- Dora Vallier, "Claude Garache", Derrière le miroir, Paris, Maeght, n 150, 1965
- Yves Bonnefoy, "In Garache's Color", Garache, février-mars 1974, Exhibition catalogue, Saint Paul de Vence, Fondation Maeght, 1974.
- Jacques Thuillier, "Notes brèves sur Claude Garache", Derrière le miroir, Paris, Maeght, n 213, mars 1975
- Jean Starobinski, Garache, Exhibition Catalogue, Maeght, 1976.
- Piero Bigongiari, "Arriva Nuvola Rossa : il pittore Claude Garache", L'Approdo Letterario, éditions della RAI, n 77-78, XXIII, juin 1977
- Alain Veinstein, "Archéologie de la mère", Derrière le miroir, Paris, Maeght, n° 237, janvier 1980.
- Jean Frémon, "Une version du réel", Garache, novembre 1983-janvier 1984, Exhibition catalogue, Marseille, Musée Grobet-Labadié, 1983
- Richard Stamelman, "The Incarnation of Red", Exhibition catalogue, Prints 1965-1985, 17 October-24 November 1985, Ezra and Cecile Zilkha Gallery, Wesleyan University.
- Marc Fumaroli, "Depuis longtemps, Vénus...", Repères. Cahiers d'art contemporain, Paris, galerie Lelong, n°50, 1988
- James McAllister, "The Image and the Furrow: Yves Bonnefoy and Claude Garache," Symposium 45 (1991), 97-108.
- Andrew Weiner, "Claude Garache", Spaightwood Newsletter, Madison, Wisconsin, 15 novembre 1991
- Georges Duby, Garache, juillet-août 1992, Exhibition catalogue, Orange, Musée d'Orange, 1992
- Michael Edwards, "Claude Garache: Painting and Repetition," an exhibition catalogue published by the Galerie Matisse, Institut Français, London, 1994.
- Peter Schofer, "Painting Rewrites Poetry: Baudelaire Through the Eyes of Claude Garache," Graven Images 2 (1995), 21-27.
- Judith G. Miller, "Bloodstone: Claude Garache and His Models," Graven Images 2 (1995), 7-10.
- Andrew D. Weiner, Claude Garache, Exhibition catalogue published on the occasion of the release of Bleue V and Bleue VI by Spaightwood Galleries, 1995
