= François Fiedler =

French painter

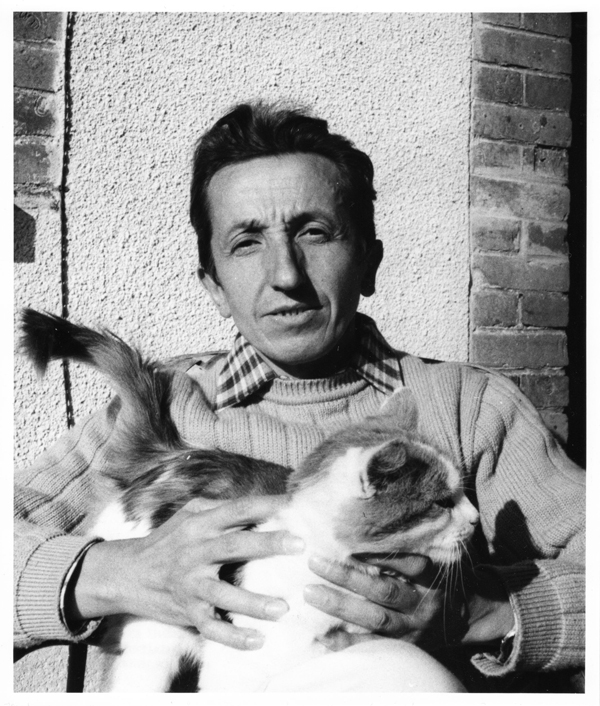
- Born: February 15, 1921; Košice, Czechoslovakia (now Slovakia)
- Died: 2001 (aged 79–80); Saint-Germain-Laval, Seine-et-Marne, France
- Known for: Painting; printmaking

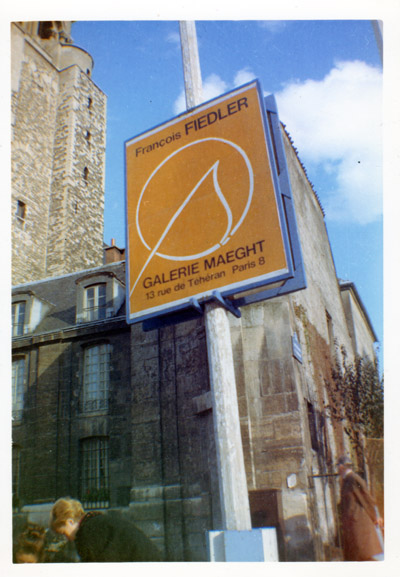
A sign promoting a Fiedler show on the streets of Paris, in front of the Church of Saint-Germain-des-Prés

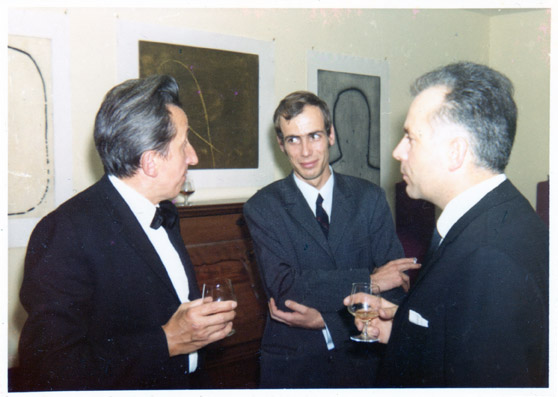
Fiedler speaks to some patrons at a salon show

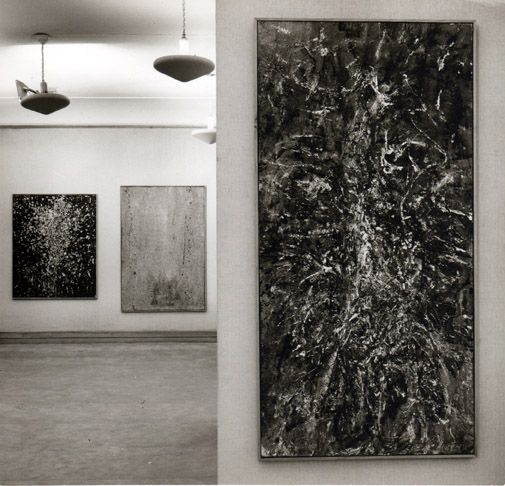
Some Fiedler works on display in Paris in the 1960s

François Fiedler (1921–2001), born Fiedler Ferenc, was a Czechoslovakia-born French painter and printmaker. He was an artist in the Aimé Maeght stable, which included Marc Chagall, Alberto Giacometti and Joan Miró.

== Biography ==
Fiedler was born in Košice, Czechoslovakia (now Slovakia), in 1921.

After receiving a Masters in Fine Arts degree from the Academy of Budapest, François Fiedler moved to Paris with his first wife in 1946. She died six months later, leaving him alone in a country where he barely spoke the language and had no friends. To make money, he made sanctioned reproductions of famous paintings for museums, as well as small figurative paintings of his own.

Fiedler met his second wife, Claire, with whom he lived in a small house in the forest south of Paris. One day while looking at a pot of house paint, crackled by the sun, he decided to reproduce this process on canvas. After this move, he ceased his figurative painting, finding expression in his new technique.

Joan Miró saw one of Fiedler's paintings in a gallery and was impressed. He sought out the artist, and so met Fiedler; they became close friends, and Miró presented him to the prominent gallerist and art dealer Aimé Maeght. Through Maeght, he became close with Giacometti, Braque, César, Ubac, Tal-Coat, Miró, Chagall, and many other artists of this era.

During his long career, Fiedler was regularly featured in salon shows alongside his contemporaries, and his works were a regular feature in the Maeght Foundation publication Derrière le miroir.

As many young collectors did not have the money to buy an oil painting, Fiedler tried to find a way to convey in etchings that which he had achieved in oils. He started a series of etchings, some in very limited editions.

Aimé Maeght had told Fiedler that he was "next in line" to be made famous; in 1981 Maeght died before Fiedler could reach that level of fame. Following the death of Maeght, Fiedler found a patron in the art photographer Daniel Kramer, who supplied Fiedler with paint and canvases, while also serving as Fiedler's manager, photographer and publicist.

Fiedler died in Saint-Germain-Laval, Seine-et-Marne, France, in 2001, leaving behind a body of work including oil paintings, monotype prints, and etchings.

Fiedler's works can still be seen in museums and galleries, including the Maeght Foundation in Paris and the Guggenheim Museum in New York City.

== Work ==
François Fiedler is one of the most important artists in the post-war Modernist School of Paris. After World War II, he settled in France, where he became fascinated with Lyrical Abstraction. He was discovered by Joan Miró, who called Fiedler "the painter of light". Miró, Georges Braque, Marc Chagall, Alexander Calder, Eduardo Chillida, Fiedler, Alberto Giacometti, Fernand Léger, Henri Matisse, Jean-Paul Riopelle, Antoni Tàpies a great circle gathered and was joined by a new generation of artists. Fiedler created a unique style in lyrical abstraction.

The only European artist, Francois Fiedler was represented in the exhibition "The Persistence of Pollock” celebrating the 100th anniversary of the birth of Jackson Pollock, the titan of Abstract Expressionism. The exhibition was held at the Pollock-Krasner House and Studio, which is the house where Jackson Pollock lived and created the 20th-century abstract expressionism masterpieces, so-called drip painting. “I entered the painting... I felt the dramatic force. The pictorial energy of canvas enchanted me. I felt the full freedom of the rhythms. I recognized the duality in Pollock’s works - improvisation and precise interpretation at the same time. I was fascinated by the works of Pollock and definitely influenced my own working methods.” said Fiedler on the occasion of “Pollock Retrospective” held at Centre Georges Pompidou in 1981, Paris.

== Francois Fiedler Foundation ==
The Francois Fiedler Foundation was established in 2006 to safeguard the life-work of Fiedler. Furthermore, its mission is to spread the study and understanding of modern art and contemporary art.
