= Claude Esteban =

French poet (1935–2006)

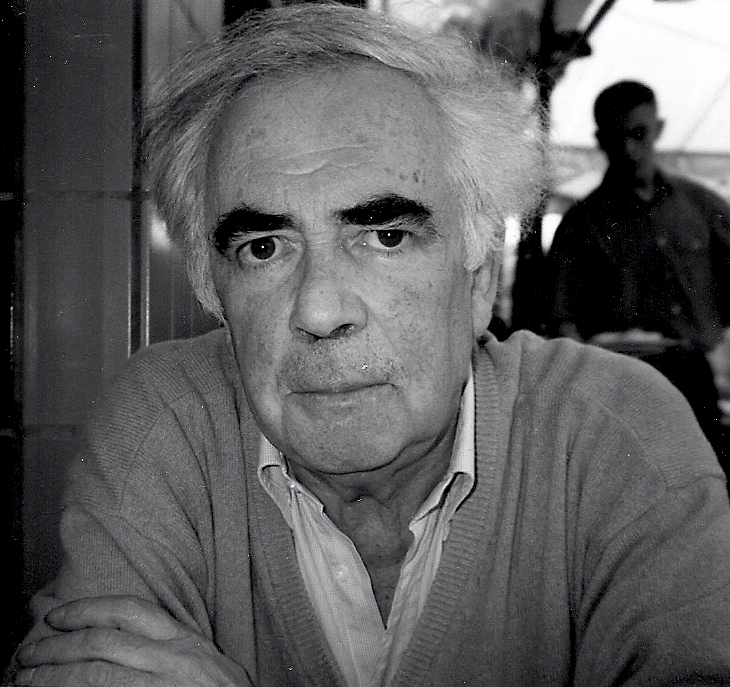
- Claude Esteban in 2003
- Born: 26 July 1935; Paris, France
- Died: 10 April 2006 (aged 70); Paris, France
- Occupation: Poet

Claude Esteban (26 July 1935, Paris – 10 April 2006, Paris) was a French poet.

Author of a major poetic œuvre of this last half-century, Claude Esteban wrote numerous essays on art and poetry and was the French translator, inter alia, of Jorge Guillén, Octavio Paz, Borges, García Lorca, or again, Quevedo.

== Biography ==
Of Spanish father and French mother, divided between two idioms, Claude Esteban was marked by the painful feeling of a division and an exile in the language, which was at the source of his poetic vocation. He recalled this experiment in Le Partage des mots (The Division of Words), a kind of autobiographical essay about language and the impossible bilingualism, which led him to poetry and to the choice of French as his poetic language. Dominated by this feeling of a "partage", he had as a concern for "gathering the scattered", exceeding separations, and thus joining together poetry and painting, translating foreign poetries into French, writing to find an immediate bond between oneself and the sensitive world.

He was a contributor to the Mercure de France from 1964, then to the Nouvelle Revue Française, in which he wrote many articles on poets and painters. In 1973, he founded the literary magazine Argile, at Maeght, with the moral support of René Char: its twenty-four issues testified to the complicity between poetry and painting, while granting a new space to translated foreign poetry. He also dedicated a monograph to Chillida, and to Palazuelo, and wrote prefaces for many exhibitions catalogs of painters such as Raoul Ubac, Vieira da Silva, Arpad Szenes, Castro, Fermín Aguayo, Giorgio Morandi, Josef Sima, Bacon, Giacometti, Braque, Le Brocquy, Chagall, etc. (Most of these texts were published again in volumes, see infra).

In 1968, he published his first book of poems, La Saison dévastée (The Season of Devastation), quickly followed by other books made with artists such as Arpad Szenes, Jean Bazaine and Raoul Ubac. These books were gathered in his first large collection of poems, published by Flammarion in 1979, Terres, travaux du cœur (Earthes, works of heart). At the same time, he published Un lieu hors de tout lieu (A Place out of any Place), an essay on poetry which, starting from the initial evocation of Virgil's Georgics, builds a reflection on poetry and a manifesto for new poetics, marked by the nostalgia of "a place out of any place" and by "a duty to seek" a new "conjuncture" between words and things.

He experienced very early on a deep admiration for the work of the great Spanish poet Jorge Guillén; they became friends, and he translated in 1977 most of Guillén's major book, Cántico for Éditions Gallimard — Guillén himself translated into Spanish some of Esteban's poems, which he inserted in his last book, Final (1982). Esteban also translated many Octavio Paz's works, such as El Mono gramático (The Monkey Grammarian). In 1980, under the title of Poèmes parallèles, he published an anthology of his translations, of which the preface, "Traduire", sets down the principles of an original reflection on poetics and on the translation of poetry. In 1987, he collected his essays on poetry and poetics in Critique de la raison poétique (Critique of Poetic Reason).

In 1984, he received the Mallarmé prize for the prose poems of Conjoncture du corps et du jardin (Conjuncture of Body and Garden). The same year, he founded the Poésie collection at the Editions Flammarion, in which he published a new generation of poets.

In 1989, three years after the death of his wife —the painter Denise Esteban—, he wrote Elégie de la mort violente (Elegy of the Violent Death), poems about mourning and memory. In 1993, he wrote Sept jours d'hier (Seven Days of yesterday), a remarkable suite of dense short poems that follow the "routes of mourning" and opens up the way of an appeasement. Deeply marked by the figure of King Lear, he published in 1996 Sur la dernière lande (On the last Heath), poems of wandering that evoke the figures of Shakespeare's tragedy. The year after, the Société des gens de lettres (SGDL) awarded him the Grand Prix of poetry for his whole work.

Painting remained for him a major interest. In 1991, he received the France Culture Prize for Soleil dans une pièce vide (Sun in an empty Room), poetic narrations inspired by Edward Hopper's paintings. He continued to write essays on art and published some luminous approaches of Velázquez, Goya, El Greco, Claude Lorrain, Rembrandt, Murillo..., until his last essay dedicated to Caravaggio, L'Ordre donnée à la nuit (The Order given to the Night), in which he draws the outlines of his art approach.

It is still painting, that of the Faiyum portraits, which caused the writing of a splendid suite of poems, Fayoum, published in 2001 by Gallimard in Morceaux de ciel, presque rien (Pieces of sky, hardly anything), that earned him the Prix Goncourt of poetry. In 2004, he published his ultimate reflections on poetry in Ce qui retourne au silence (What returns to silence), which also includes an essay on Robert Bresson and another on Varlam Shalamov's Kolyma Tales.

He had been a student of the prestigious École Normale Supérieure of Paris, and was professor of Spanish literature at the Paris-Sorbonne University until 1996, and then he became President of the Maison des Ecrivains (the French Writers House) from 1998 to 2004.

Shortly before his death, an anthology of his poems came out — Le Jour à peine écrit (1967-1992) (The Day scarcely written) — while the manuscript of his last book and poetic legacy was completed under the title of La Mort à distance (Death at a distance); it was published by Gallimard in May 2007.

== Awards ==
Each year links to its corresponding "[year] in poetry" article:

- 1984: Mallarmé prize, for Conjoncture du corps et du jardin
- 1991: France Culture prize, for Soleil dans une pièce vide
- 1997: Grand Prix of poetry of the Société des gens de lettres, for his whole work
- 2001: Prix Goncourt of poetry, for his whole work

== Works ==
=== Poetry, translated into English ===
- A Smile between the stones, transl. by John Montague, Agenda Editions (Mayfield, UK), 2005.
- On the Last Heath, transl. by John Montague, in Poetry (Chicago, Oct.-Nov. 2000), p. 78-83.
- Conjuncture of Body and Garden, in Poetry Network 1 (Claude Esteban and Bernard Noël), collective translation (organized by The Tyrone Guthrie Centre and Poetry Ireland/Eigse Éireann, supervised by Theo Dorgan and John Montague), Dublin, Dedalus, 1992.
- Conjuncture of Body and Garden – Cosmogony, transl. by James Phillips, Larkspur (CA, USA), Kosmos, Modern Poets in Translation Series, vol. 4, 1988.
- The Season of Devastation, transl. by Stanley Cavell, Pequod, 16-17 (San Francisco, 1984), p. 240-242.
- Transparent God, transl. by David Cloutier, Larkspur (CA, USA), Kosmos, Modern Poets in Translation Series, vol. 2, 1983.
- White Road, Selected Poems of Claude Esteban, transl. by David Cloutier, Washington DC, The Charioteer Press, 1979.

=== In French ===
==== Poetry ====
Each year links to its corresponding "[year] in poetry" article:

- 2007: La Mort à distance, Gallimard
- 2006: Le Jour à peine écrit (1967-1992), Gallimard
- 2001: Morceaux de ciel, presque rien, Gallimard
- 2001: Etranger devant la porte, I. Variations, Farrago
- 1999: Janvier, février, mars. Pages, Farrago
- 1996: Sur la dernière lande, Fourbis
- 1995: Quelqu'un commence à parler dans une chambre, Flammarion
- 1993: Sept jours d'hier, Fourbis
- 1991: Soleil dans une pièce vide, Flammarion; reissue Farrago, 2003; Éditions Unes, 2026
- 1989: Elégie de la mort violente, Flammarion
- 1985: Le Nom et la Demeure, Flammarion
- 1983: Conjoncture du corps et du jardin suivi de Cosmogonie, Flammarion
- 1979: Terres, travaux du cœur, Flammarion

==== Essays on poetry, literature and language ====
- Ce qui retourne au silence, Farrago, 2004 (essays on French poetry, poetics, Stanley Cavell, Yves Bonnefoy, Robert Bresson and Varlam Shalamov)
- Etranger devant la porte, II. Thèmes, Farrago, 2001 (essays on Stéphane Mallarmé, Pierre Reverdy, René Char, André du Bouchet, Jacques Dupin, poetic translation and collective translation.)
- D'une couleur qui fut donnée à la mer, Fourbis, 1997 (essays on poetic language, on Gérard de Nerval as Heine's translator, on García Lorca, and translations of Virgil and T. S. Eliot into French).
- Le Partage des mots, Gallimard, 1990.
- Critique de la raison poétique, Flammarion, 1987 (3 essays on poetry, another about translation, others on Hölderlin, Antonio Machado, Saint-John Perse, Jorge Guillén, Gaston Bachelard, Yves Bonnefoy, Philippe Jaccottet, Bernard Noël, Adonis and Octavio Paz).
- Un lieu hors de tout lieu, Galilée, 1979.

==== Essays on art and monographs ====
- Par-delà les figures. Écrits sur l'art, 1964-2006, edited by Xavier Bruel and Paul-Henri Giraud, preface by Pierre Vilar, L'Atelier contemporain, 2024.
- L'Ordre donné à la nuit, Verdier, 2005.
- La Dormition du Comte d'Orgaz, Farrago, 2002 (essays on Greco, Le Lorrain, Saenredam, Velázquez, Rembrandt, Murillo, Goya, Picasso).
- Traces, figures, traversées. Essais sur la peinture contemporaine., Galilée, 1985 (essays on Braque, Chagall, Morandi, Sima, De Kooning, Fernández, Aguayo, Lam, Szenes, Bazaine, Ubac, Tal-Coat, Hayter, Bacon, Le Brocquy, Nasser Assar, Palazuelo, Appel and Alechinsky).
- Palazuelo, Maeght, 1980.
- Ubac, Maeght, 1978.
- L'Immédiat et l'Inaccessible, Galilée, 1978 (essays on Baudelaire and painting, Matisse, Morandi, Giacometti, Vieira da Silva, Szenes, Ubac, Aguayo, Picasso, Dubuffet, Paulhan, Bacon, Breton and surrealism, Yves Bonnefoy and painting).
- Veilleurs aux confins (Fernández, Morandi, Sima, Szenes, Tal-Coat, Ubac, Vieira da Silva), Fata Morgana, 1978.
- Chillida, Maeght, 1972.
