= Fondation Maeght =

Modern art museum in Saint-Paul de Vence, France

Coordinates: 43°42′02″N 7°06′54″E

The Fondation Maeght building in Saint-Paul de Vence, France.

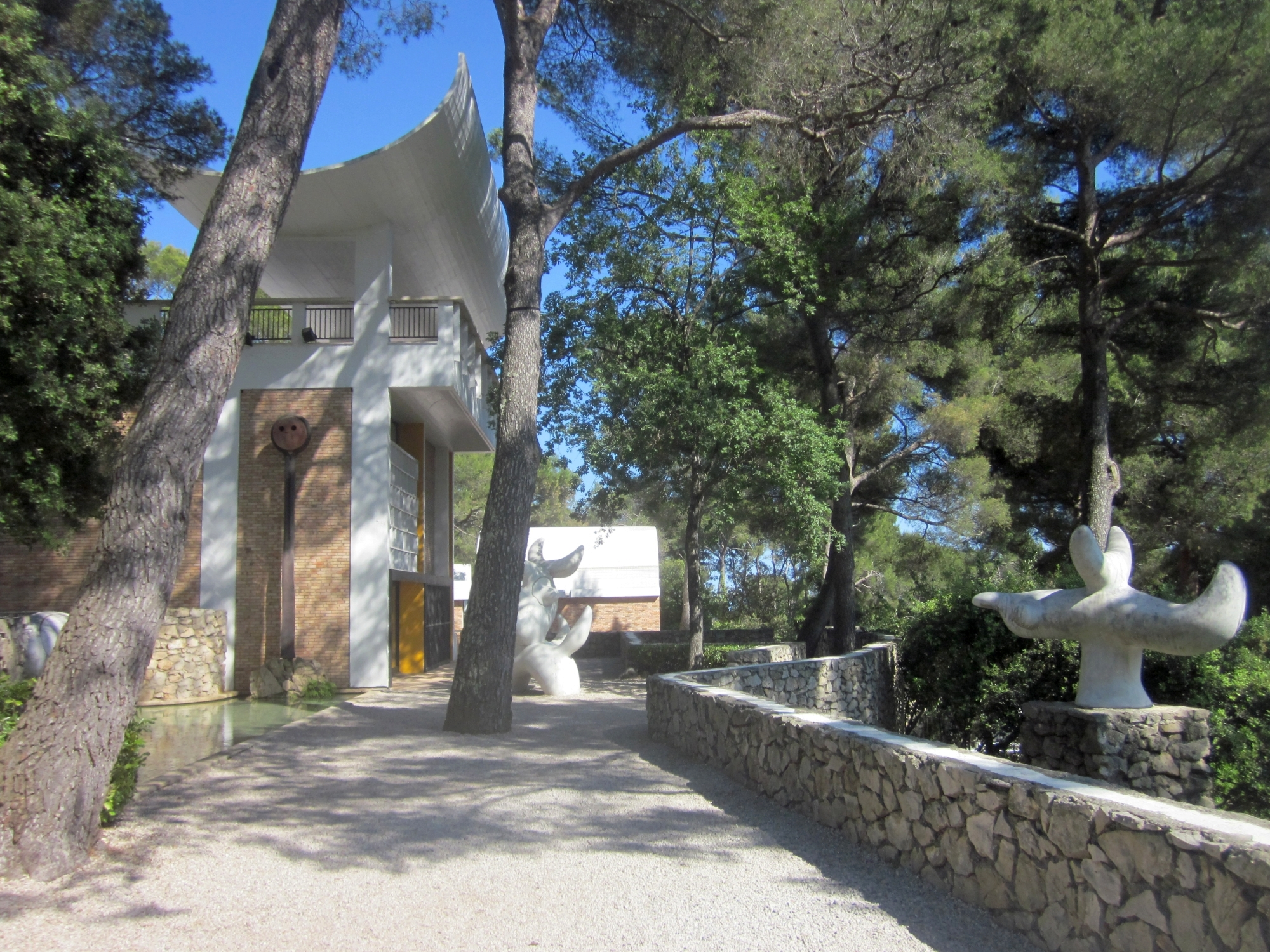
View of the sculpture garden at The Fondation Maeght in Saint-Paul de Vence, France.

The Maeght Foundation or Fondation Maeght (pronounced [mɑɡ]) is a museum of modern art on the Colline des Gardettes, a hill overlooking Saint-Paul de Vence in the southeast of France about 25 km (16 mi) from Nice. It was established by Marguerite and Aimé Maeght in 1964 and houses paintings, sculptures, collages, ceramics and all forms of modern art.

The collection includes works by many important 20th-century artists including Jean Arp, Pierre Bonnard, Georges Braque, Alexander Calder, Marc Chagall, Sam Francis, Alberto Giacometti, Wassily Kandinsky, Ellsworth Kelly, Fernand Léger, Anne Madden and Joan Miró among others.

The building was designed by the Spanish architect Josep Lluís Sert, houses more than 12,000 pieces of art and attracts "on average, 200,000 visitors ... every year". There is a small chapel dedicated to Saint Bernard, in memory of Bernard, the son of Aimé and Marguerite Maeght who died of leukemia, aged eleven.

The foundation is entirely independently funded with no reliance on state subsidies. Adrien Maeght is the chairman of the foundation's administrative council, which also includes Isabelle Maeght and her sister Yoyo Maeght.

As of 2024, the museum is home to 13,000 objects. It celebrated its 60th anniversary with a new expansion that was designed by Paris-based firm Silvio d’Ascia Architecture. The expansion adds over 5,000 square feet to the footprint and has been done without disturbing any of the original architecture by Josep Lluís Sert.

== History ==
=== The Maeght Gallery ===
In December 1945, Aimé and Marguerite Maeght opened the Maeght Gallery in Paris, which quickly became a gathering place for artists, poets, and writers. Among them were painters like Matisse, Bonnard, and Braque, who supported Aimé Maeght’s projects. The group expanded with the addition of artists such as Fernand Léger, Joan Miró, Bram and Geer Van Velde, and later, between 1946 and 1951, with Marc Chagall, Alexander Calder, Raoul Ubac, Alberto Giacometti, and Wassily Kandinsky, who exhibited at the Maeght Gallery for the first time. In 1947, this visionary couple organized the first surrealist exhibition centered on André Breton and Marcel Duchamp.

=== The Creation of the Maeght Foundation ===
Georges Braque, supported by André Malraux—then Minister of Cultural Affairs—suggested that Marguerite and Aimé Maeght embark on an ambitious project: the creation of a new type of cultural space in the south of France, in Saint-Paul-de-Vence, where the Maeghts already owned a home.

Following Braque’s advice, the Maeghts traveled to the United States in 1955 to visit American foundations such as the Barnes Foundation, the Phillips Collection, and the Guggenheim Museum.

Inspired by these models, the Maeght Foundation opened its doors on July 28, 1964, in Saint-Paul-de-Vence. It was inaugurated by André Malraux, who declared, "Here, an attempt is being made to do something that has never been attempted before: to create a universe in which modern art can find both its place and that background once called the supernatural."

The foundation was entirely funded by Aimé and Marguerite Maeght, ensuring its financial independence and enabling it to freely choose its program and exhibitions.

The board of directors currently consists of 11 members, including three representatives from the supervisory ministries. The director is responsible for administration, conservation of the works, and exhibitions.

Recognized as a public utility, the foundation is authorized to receive donations, bequests, and sponsorships, allowing it to preserve and expand its collection, maintain its architectural heritage, and develop cultural activities.

== Collections ==
The Maeght Foundation holds one of the largest collections of modern and contemporary paintings, sculptures, drawings, and graphic works in Europe, with over 13,000 items.

The foundation’s collection includes over 1,000 paintings and sculptures, 600 drawings, 6,000 prints, and more than 30,000 books. It is composed of works from Aimé and Marguerite Maeght’s personal collection, along with commissions and purchases from artists. The collection aims to be diverse, bringing together multiple generations of artists.

Alberto Giacometti is one of the most prominently featured artists at the foundation. The collection includes 35 sculptures, 25 drawings, and 60 prints and lithographs, including rare bronzes from the 1930s like The Cube, The Invisible Object, and The Fountain. The Maeght Foundation notably owns both versions of Walking Man and both versions of Standing Woman.

The collection also encompasses a substantial portion of Joan Miró’s work, with eight paintings, 140 sculptures, 75 drawings, around 100 collages and models, and over a thousand lithographs and engravings.

== Exhibitions ==
Since its opening in 1964, the Maeght Foundation has organized over 140 thematic, monographic, and contemporary artist exhibitions, including:

- Thematic exhibitions: Living Art in the United States, Art in Motion, The Nude in the 20th Century, Russia and the Avant-Gardes, The Adventures of Truth, At the Heart of Abstraction.
- Monographic exhibitions: Kandinsky, Chagall, Alexander Calder, Matisse, de Staël, Bonnard, Giacometti, Miró, Braque, Dubuffet.
- Contemporary artist exhibitions: Yan Pei-Ming, Pier Paolo Calzolari, Takis, Jacques Monory, Gérard Garouste, Christo et Jeanne-Claude, Eduardo Arroyo, Lee Bae, Bernard Moninot.

The Foundation has also hosted exhibitions dedicated to writers, their role in art, and the painters they supported. Examples include shows for Pierre Reverdy in 1970, René Char in 1971, and André Malraux in 1973.

The Foundation also organizes exhibitions abroad in museums or private foundations in cities such as Tehran, Granada, Brussels, Madrid, Turin, and Stockholm.

== Architecture ==
=== Building Layout ===
The building housing the foundation’s collections was designed by Catalan architect Josep Lluís Sert, recommended by Joan Miró. The initial idea was to create an artists’ village, not a museum.

Sert based his design on that of a Mediterranean village, with everything organized around a central point: the chapel. Each building serves a unique function, such as the library, café, bookstore, office, exhibition halls, and engraving and ceramics workshops—much like a village.

The building’s rhythm is set by white claustra walls and glass facades, inviting visitors to view the woods, sea, patio, or the pool decorated by Braque. Sert retained the natural slope of the land, arranging exhibition rooms, patios, and gardens on various terrace levels, which gives the building its distinctive character.

The chapel, dedicated to Saint Bernard, is a consecrated space housing a 12th-century Spanish Christ figure gifted by Cristóbal Balenciaga, as well as a slate-carved Stations of the Cross by Raoul Ubac. Ubac also created the stained glass The Cross and the Rosary, while White Bird was created by Georges Braque.

An exhibition on architect Josep Lluís Sert was held in 2014 to celebrate the foundation’s 50th anniversary.

=== An HQE Building ===
The Maeght Foundation is the first building to achieve Haute Qualité Environnementale (HQE, High Environmental Quality) certification. Sert designed a space where light, natural ventilation, airflow, water, and plant shading were essential components, making it a pioneer of sustainable architecture.

The issue of exhibition hall lighting was addressed by using semi-vaulted roofs, actual “light traps” that capture and diffuse sunlight through glass panels.

Sert aimed for indirect natural light to preserve the artworks. This natural light connects the interior with the outside surroundings.

To the dismay of some architectural advocates, several openings envisioned by Sert, including skylights, had to be closed off to better protect the artwork inside.

The foundation’s two large white impluvium are iconic. They serve dual purposes: collecting rainwater to fill pools and providing coolness to the exhibition rooms through the shade they cast.

In 2008, Italian architect Silvio d’Ascia led restoration and expansion efforts.

=== The Artists' Contribution ===
Painters and sculptors collaborated with Josep Lluís Sert on the architecture by creating works integrated into the building and nature: the Giacometti courtyard, the Miró Labyrinth filled with sculptures and ceramics, wall mosaics by Marc Chagall and Pierre Tal Coat, the pool and mosaic by Braque, the chapel's stained glass window based on the Birds theme created by Georges Braque for the ceiling of the Louvre museum, and Pol Bury's animated fountain.

The building has been labeled as “20th Century Heritage” by the Ministry of Culture.

==== Joan Miró ====
Each year, Joan Miró spent several months in Saint-Paul with the Maeghts, where he worked in the engraving and ceramics studios. As a token of gratitude, he donated several hundred works to the foundation. In 1979, the foundation celebrated the artist’s 85th birthday, unveiling a monumental stained glass window designed by Miró for the foundation.

===== Miró's Labyrinth =====
Aimé Maeght invited Joan Miró to use the foundation's gardens. Alongside his childhood friend from Barcelona, Josep Llorens Artigas, Miró reinvented monumental sculpture, blending it with nature and architecture. For the Labyrinth, he created a dreamlike world populated by fantastic animals.

The Catalan artist explored various materials, mainly using ceramics: the Lizard climbs the patio wall, the Wall consists of 468 ceramic panels, The Sundial sculpture, and his most significant piece, The Goddess of Fertility. The main building’s brick wall supports The Personage, a brown ceramic face perched atop a tall iron rod.

The Tower is crowned by an iron bird, The Solar Bird and The Lunar Bird are made of Carrara marble, and The Fork, crafted from iron and bronze, echoes the symbol of the raised fist of Spanish peasants during the civil war. The Great Arch, made of concrete, features Miró’s recurring signs engraved with a jackhammer.

In the center of a pool stands The Woman with Disheveled Hair in white marble, and another pool hosts three of the artist's gargoyles.

One can also see Ariadne’s Thread, a white line painted by Miró on low walls, guiding visitors through their walk.

==== Alberto and Diego Giacometti ====
The Giacometti courtyard lies at the bottom of the main building with its pagoda roofs. This courtyard hosted the Foundation’s Nights as well as concerts and large events.

All decorative elements of the foundation, such as benches, doors, lamps, and streetlights, were designed by Alberto Giacometti and Diego Giacometti. The entire café’s furniture, called Café Diego, is a special creation by Diego for the foundation. He designed the shelves, counters, lamps, chairs, and tables in bronze and wrought iron.

==== Georges Braque ====
Georges Braque created the south stained glass window of the Saint-Bernard chapel in 1962, where his white bird embodies the sacred. He also designed a mosaic pool depicting fish.

==== Raoul Ubac ====
Raoul Ubac created the north stained glass window of the Saint-Bernard chapel as well as the fourteen Stations of the Cross in sculpted slate in 1961. Also, on one of the exterior walls of the foundation, is the artist's largest wall sculpture.

==== Marc Chagall ====
Marc Chagall specifically created for the foundation a wall mosaic titled 'The Lovers' or 'Welcome.' It depicts the Maeght couple welcoming visitors. He also signed The Life, a painting that summarizes his own life up to that point."

== A multicultural structure ==
=== The Nuits de la fondation ===
The Maeght Foundation does not see itself as a museum, but as a large workshop where all the living arts can come together.

The Nuits de la fondation Maeght took place every summer from 1965 to 1970. Here, the public could discover pioneering experimental music artists such as Terry Riley, Pierre Boulez and Cecil Taylor. The foundation also played host to contemporary music, dance and avant-garde theatre.

=== The library ===
The Maeght Foundation has had a public library since 1972. It contains around 10,000 volumes on art, complete collections of the main art magazines and catalogues of the world's leading museums. It is open by appointment to researchers and students.

=== The cinema ===
The foundation included an art cinema that ran every day in the summer and three days a week during the rest of the year. Around fifty films about the artists, most of them produced by Maeght, were shown there on an alternating basis.

== See also ==
- Galerie Maeght
- Labyrinth (Joan Miró) — sculpture installation at the museum.
- Nuits de la Fondation Maeght Vol. 1 (1970) by Albert Ayler
- Fondation Maeght Nights, Volume 1 & 2 (1970) by Sun Ra Arkestra
