= Hervé Télémaque =

French painter (1937–2022)

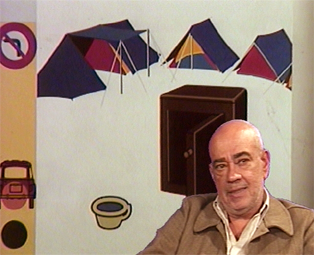
- Born: 5 November 1937; Port-au-Prince, Haiti
- Died: 10 November 2022 (aged 85)
- Known for: Painting, graphic designer
- Awards: Ordre des Arts et des Lettres (1995); Legion of Honour (2006)

Hervé Télémaque (5 November 1937 – 10 November 2022) was a French painter of Haitian origin, associated with the surrealism and the narrative figuration movements. He lived and worked in Paris from 1961 on.

== Biography ==
Télémaque was born in Port-au-Prince, Haiti. Following a health problem, he had to give up his hopes of competing in sports. In 1957, when François Duvalier came to power, he left Haiti for New York City and joined the Art Student's League until 1960, when his teacher, the painter Julian Levi, encouraged his artistic vocation. During his stay in the United States, where he frequented museums, he was simultaneously intellectually nourished by abstract expressionism, then surrealism, as used and reinterpreted by American artists (De Kooning, Lam, etc.), and in particular by the influence of Arshile Gorky. As early as 1959, his painting entitled Sirène (Musée Sainte-Croix) marked his uniqueness. Télémaque wanted to be reality-based and escape abstraction: even the title refers to his daily life, evoking the boats sirens he heard from his room in Brooklyn Heights. With L'Annonce faite à Marie (Musée des beaux-arts de Dole, FNAC), which recalls his marriage the same year with Maël Pilié, the theme of sexuality, especially present at the beginning of his work, is announced (Histoire sexuelle, 1960; Ciel de lit n°3, 1962, Musée d'art moderne et d'art contemporain de Nice; Femme merveille, 1963, Institut d'art contemporain de Villeurbanne).

He was disappointed by the segregationist atmosphere in the United States¹. (Toussaint Louverture in New York, 1960, Dole Museum). In 1961, he came to France and settled in Paris. He frequented the surrealists there, without formally joining the group. But it was in the precepts of population art (comic strip, use of the episcope, then in 1966 use of acrylic) that he truly found his very particular way, while defending European creation, more critical of society. Since 1962, he took part in the adventure of Narrative Figuration, bringing together artists such as Bernard Rancillac, Eduardo Arroyo, Peter Klasen, Öyvind Fahlström, and Jacques Monory, which the critic Gérald Gassiot-Talabot gathered in 1964, at the request of Télémaque and Rancillac, in an exhibition entitled "Mythologies quotidiennes". From 1962 to 1964, he produced one of his most original series, in particular in the form of diptychs, where pieces of anatomy², accompanied by visual metaphors named "fictions"; (cross, arrow, weapon, underwear, urn, mask) and comments, sometimes simply written in chalk or pencil, flow on an initially white background (Le voyage, 1962; Portrait de famille, 1962, Fondation Gandur pour l'Art; Etude pour une carte du tendre, 1963;My Darling Clementine, 1963, MNAM, etc.).

"In the sixties, I settle down in the stripping, I become part of the Arte povera movement. This is a real break with the Baroque enumeration that is taking place there. The cane appears in my work in 1968. Especially with Le Désert, a cane broken into two pieces, cut from a sphere, a derisory stick for an improbable walking."

A statement made to art critic Alexia Guggémos in a long interview published by Somogy Editions (Confidence, published in 2015).

Télémaque intended to compose his own vocabulary, going beyond a narrative speech with a socio-political aim (One of 36,000 Marines, 1963, Gandur Foundation), from which he moves away from 1967, to the benefit of an inner poetic and jubilant universe, more hermetic, enriched by the experience of his own psychoanalysis started in 1958 with Georges Devereux, and this time inspired by the works of De Chirico, René Magritte or Marcel Duchamp. Thus, in his paintings are found evocative everyday objects, notably of his lived experience in Haiti, and of multiple interpretations at the will of the spectator, complex reading images such as riddles to be deciphered (toothless head, Baron Samedi's white cane, sports shoes and equipment, camping furniture, and tents, etc.), despite the exegesis performed by the art critic Anne Tronche in 2003.

"I have always represented tents. Is it a sign from an artist who lives like an exile? For me, that's no. It

is just a strictly metaphysical sign of the human dwelling. In fact, it is a painting on the human

home."

In 1964, the artist adopted the clear line; inspired by Hergé (Petit Célibataire un peu nègre et assez joyeux, 1964, MNAM), then introduced objects on the canvas in 1966 with his series of "Combine paintings", evoking those of Robert Rauschenberg (1953–1964) and even more, those contemporary to Martial Raysse (Confidence, 1965, Fondation Gandur; Touareg, pèlerinage avec ressemblances, Lille Métropole Musée d'art moderne, d'art contemporain et d'art brut, 1966. Between 1968 and 1969, he stopped painting to practice only assemblage with his "lean sculptures", like Duchamp's ready-made sculptures. In sculpture, as in painting, it is a question of making ordinary things or objects surprising, of opening up possibilities of multiple meanings to icons or fragments of icons, originally univocal. Télémaque, returned to painting in 1970, with his series "Les Passages" and "Suites à Magritte", adopting a refined style formed by solid colours (Caca-Soleil !, 1970, MNAM, of duchampian spirit), and indulged in drawing and collages from 1974, with his series "Selles" in 1977, then "Maisons rurales" in 1980.

In 1973, he returned for the first time to Haiti to see his mother, where he resourced his imaginary. Then in 1976 he began large acrylic paintings, mainly with new shapes in ellipse or tondo, in view of the exhibition organized in 1976 by the ARC at the Musée d'art moderne de la Ville de Paris. In 1985 he became a naturalized French citizen and, among other public purchasing orders Hôpital de la Salpêtrière in 1984, RER station of the Musée d'Orsay in 1986), he received an order for a 13 meters long monumental mural Vallée de l'Omo, created in 1986 for the Cité des sciences et de l'industrie de La Villette and that also for Maman at the Hôpital de la Salpêtrière. In 1986, he also had his first solo exhibition in the Caraïbe with about twenty paintings exhibited at the Casa de las Americas, during the 2nd Biennale de La Havana.

From the 1990s onwards, Télémaque continued his research through large-format charcoal drawings, initiated in 1992, and surprising low-reliefs, where the jigsaw replaces the pencil. Marked by the illness, then the death of his mother in 1993, and undoubtedly by the memory of the voodoo that was reigning in Haiti, he approached the theme of mourning in a darker way (bat, skull) and did his own magic in creating blends mixing coffee grounds with coloured pigments, to give them a sensual heaviness.

After the exhibition "Charcoal and coffee grounds – Mourning: drawing, the object", at the Louis Carré & Cie gallery in 1994 (catalogue prefaced by Yves Michaud), Télémaque exhibited "Works after nature"; (catalogue prefaced by Philippe Curval), at the Electricité de France foundation in 1995. His double exhibition at the Foire internationale d'art contemporain (Louis Carré & Cie gallery stand and Marwan Hoss gallery stand) was followed by four retrospectives, first at Electra – EDF Foundation in Paris, at the "Electrical Workshop"; in Johannesburg (South Africa) in 1997, at IVAM in Valence (Spain) in 1998, then at the Tanlay Art Centre (Yonne) in summer 1999.

The 2000s saw a return to African sources, which the "negritude"; movement claims to be its own, and to a fresh look at French political events, possibly tinged with humour. In 2000, he returned to an activity that he had not practiced for many years, book illustration. After several stays in Africa, Télémaque produced a series of acrylic paintings entitled "Trottoirs d'Afrique", presented in 2001 at the Louis Carré & Cie gallery (catalogue prefaced by Gérard Durozoi). Nevertheless, and despite a career path which was naturally part of the evolution and intellectual questioning of 20th century modern art, the evocation of his country and origins, even metaphorically indirect, never departed from his work (Afrique et Toussaint Louverture à New York, 1960; Venus Hottentote et Comics pour Harlem, 1962; My Darling Clementine and Black Magic, 1963; Voir ELLE et Banania 1, 1964; Convergence, 1966; Port-au-Prince, le fils prodigue, 1970; Le Silence veille à Saint-Marc (Haiti), 1975; Afrique, 1980; La Mère-patrie, 1981; Mère Afrique, 1982; Le Voyage d'Hector Hyppolite en Afrique n°1, 2000; Deep South, 2001, etc.). Fonds d'actualité n°1 (at the MNAM) is an indirect tribute to the satirical cartoonists Plantu and Pancho, with the figure of Jacques Chirac, then "elected as in Africa" with 82.21% of the votes. In 2002, the IUFM of Lyon made an exhibition around this large painting and coffee grounds objects.

On the occasion of the publication of a first monograph by Anne Tronche at Flammarion, in "La Création contemporaine"; collection, Louis Carré & Cie gallery presents on its stand at Fiac 2003 an exhibition bringing together a set of major works from the 1960s, entitled "Paris 1961". In 2005, he created a cycle of three monumental murals for the courtroom of the Court House in Laval. In 2010, following the 2010 Haiti earthquake of January 12, Télémaque sponsored the "Haiti Action Artists" auction, which aimed to give Haitian artists the means to rework and to create durable solutions.

A retrospective exhibition of his work dedicated was held by the Musée national d'art moderne at the Centre Pompidou from February 25, 2015, to May 18, 2015, with 74 paintings, drawings, collages, objects, and assemblages, replicated at the Musée Cantini, then in 2016 at the Fondation Clément in Martinique, with a selection of about 50 paintings directly related to the West Indies and Africa.

The MoMA (Museum of Modern Art) acquired a painting from the New York years No Title (The Ugly American) 1962/64 thanks to the patronage of Marie-Josée and Henry Kravis in honour of Jerry Speyer, three personalities close to the New York Museum. A painting of his was exhibited at the Guttklein Fine Art Gallery in Paris in 2018. In this exhibition entitled "Jalons", Télémaque for the first time exhibited Témoins (1998) a mural painting symbolizing a return to his Haitian roots. In 2019, he created a surprise at the Rabouan Moussion gallery in Paris where, in the exhibition "L'inachevée conception", he presented an imposing canvas of ten meters long. Produced in the calm of his workshop in Verneuil-sur-Avre in Normandy, the painting Al l'en Guinée (2016–18) evokes the fantasized journey of a long-distance walker. "It's a hike on life" laughed the painter known for his metaphorical images, steep wefts, and diversionary beacons. In "randonnée"; infuses the idea of a long-distance trip. Is it death or a joyful return to the land of the ancestors?

== Collective exhibitions (selection) ==
- 1962: Paris, Musée d'art moderne de la ville de Paris, Art latino-américain à Paris, with Jorge Camacho, Simona Ertan, Joaquin Ferrer, Eduardo Jonquieres, Wifredo Lam, Roberto Matta, Jesus Rafael Soto...
- 1964: He participates in the exposition Mythologies quotidiennes, organised at musée d'Art moderne de la Ville de Paris, associating him with the Narrative Figuration,
- 1968: Cassel (Hesse), Documenta IV et Venise, Biennale de Venise,
- 1972: Paris, Grand Palais, exposition Douze ans d'art contemporain,
- 1976: Paris, MAMVP, rétrospective à l'ARC,
- 1980: Recherche Art et Industrie de Renault,
- 1982: Paris, Grand Palais, Foire internationale d'art contemporain (FIAC), galerie Adrien Maeght,
- 1996: Foire internationale d'art contemporain, galerie Louis Carré & Cie et galerie Marwan Hoss,
- 2006: Paris, Grand Palais, La Force de l'art,
- 2006: Paris, galeries nationales du Grand Palais, Il était une fois Walt Disney. Aux sources de l'art des studios Disney,
- 2008: Paris, galeries nationales du Grand Palais, Figuration narrative. Paris, 1960–1972,
- 2009: Paris, La Maison rouge, fondation Antoine de Galbert, Vraoum ! trésors de la bande dessinée et art contemporain
- 2009: Paris, Musée d'art moderne de la Ville de Paris, Dans l'œil du critique. Bernard Lamarche-Vadel et les artistes
- 2011: Paris, musée du Louvre, salle de la Chapelle, Musée Monde (dans le cadre de l'exposition Le Louvre invite Jean-Marie G. Le Clézio)
- 2014: Paris, Grand Palais, Haïti, deux siècles de création artistique, 19 November 2014 – 15 February 2015
- 2016: Munich, Haus der Kunst, Ockwui Enwezor Post War
- 2022: Paris, Musée de l'Histoire de l'immigration, « Paris and nowhere else »

== Solo exhibitions (selection) ==
- 1964: London, Hanover Gallery
- 1964: Paris, galerie Mathias Fels
- 1965: Rome, L'Attico
- 1967: Paris, galerie Mathias Fels
- 1971: Paris, galerie Mathias Fels "Passage" (Achat d'une œuvre par le Président Pompidou).
- 1979: Paris, Zurich, galerie Maeght "Selles"
- 1981: Paris, galerie Adrien Maeght
- 1986: Casa de las Americas, dans le cadre de la IIe biennale de La Havana.
- 1989: Paris, galerie Jacqueline Moussion, first personal exposure, New York 1960.
- 1991: Paris, galerie Jacqueline Moussion, retrospective from 1973 and series La Chambre noire.
- 1994: Paris, galerie Louis Carré, Fusain et marc de café – Deuil : le dessin, l'objet.
- 1995: Retrospective at Electra Fondation in Paris, Œuvres d'après nature.
- 1997: Johannesburg, retrospective at Electrical workshop.
- 1998: Valencia, retrospective at Institut Valencià d'Art Modern of Valencia.
- 1999: Centre d'art de Tanlay, Hervé Télémaque: des Modes & Travaux et creation of an original work for the stamp of France commemorating the abolition of slavery, issued in April.
- 2001: Paris, galerie Louis Carré & Cie, Trottoirs d'Afrique.
- 2005: Paris, musée de la Poste, Hervé Télémaque. Du coq à l'âne (rétrospective).
- 2009: Paris, galerie Louis Carré & Cie, Combine painting 1965–1969
- 2010: Baie-Mahault (Guadeloupe), Hervé Télémaque is the guest of honor of the 2nd edition of "Art Bemao", a modern and contemporary art event that presents a current look at the visual arts in Guadeloupe
- 2011: Paris, galerie Louis Carré & Cie, La Canopée, The Brown paper bag
- 2013: Paris, galerie Louis Carré & Cie, Passages et autres (1970–1980)
- 2015: Paris, Centre Pompidou, 25 February-18 May
- 2015: Musée de Louviers
- 2015: Marseille, Musée Cantini
- 2016: Le François, Martinique, Fondation Clément
- 2018: Paris, galerie Guttklein Fine Art, "Jalons" 1, 2
- 2019: Paris, galerie Rabouan Moussion, "L'inachevée conception"
- 2021: Londres, Serpentine Gallery, "A Hopscotch of the Mind"
- 2023: Etats-Unis, Musée d'art d'Aspen, "A Hopscotch of the Mind"

== Acquisitions (selection) ==
The Centre Pompidou's National Museum of Modern Art owns 18 artworks by Télémaque. Among them, 8 paintings and one sculpture added in 2014 thanks to a donation from the artist. The MOMA possess three of Télémaque's artworks including No title (The Ugly American) 1962/64.

== Publications (selection) ==
- Hervé Télémaque – Monographie, by Anne Tronche, Groupe Flammarion (2003)
- Confidence d'Hervé Télémaque, interviewed by Alexia Guggémos, Somogy Éditions d'Art (maison d'édition) (2015)
- Télémaque, by Gérard Durozoi, David Lemaire, Alexia Guggémos, Flammarion (2015)

== Archives ==
- (in French) Archives, Hervé Télémaque, list of creations from 1958 to 1978, Galerie Louis Carré & Cie

== Sources ==
- (in French) Hervé Télémaque, video interview, encyclopédie audiovisuelle de l'art contemporain
- (in French) Hervé Télémaque, galerie Louis Carré & Cie, Galerie Louis Carré & Cie
- (in French) Hervé Télémaque, Bernard Vasseur, éditions Cercle d'art, 2013, 128 pages, cercledart.com
- (in French) Hervé Télémaque, Résultats de ventes aux enchères passées, artnet.com
- (in French) Hervé Télémaque, exposition au Centre Pompidou du 25 février au 18 mai 2015, centrepompidou.fr
- (in French) "Curator Yasmil Raymond discusses what was so “ugly” about Télémaque's America.", moma.org
- (in French) Hervé Télémaque, Rabouan Moussion Gallery, artist page]
