= Jacques Gamblin =

French actor

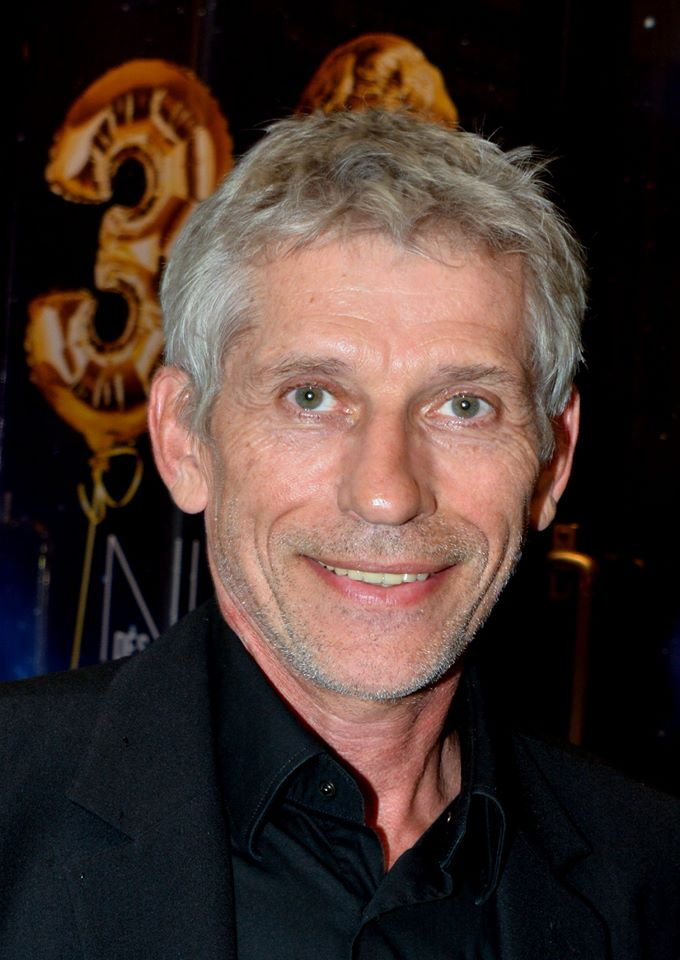
- Jacques Gamblin in 2018
- Born: Granville, Manche, France
- Occupation: Actor
- Years active: 1977-present

Jacques Gamblin is a French actor.

== Life and career ==
Gamblin studied at the Centre dramatique de Caen (Caen Dramatic Arts Centre).

He was a professional technician in a theater company before he studied at the Comédie de Caen and acted on stage in Brittany at the Totem Theatre in Saint-Brieuc before joining the National Theatre, directed by Pierre de Rennes Debauche. H

He worked with theatre directors including Pierre Claude Yersin, Michel Dubois, Jeanne Champagne, Philippe Adrien, Alfredo Arias, Charles Tordjman, Jean-Louis Martinelli, Gildas Bourdet, and Anne Bourgeois.

He is also the author of plays including The Touch Hardware and hip (1997).

== Theater ==
Year	Title	Author	Director	Notes
1977	George Dandin ou le Mari confondu	Molière	Bernard Lotti	
1978	La Ballade de Billy Peau	Argile	Bernard Lotti	
1979	Le Cid	Pierre Corneille	Pierre Debauche	
1980	Marion du Faouët	Robert Angebaud	Robert Angebaud	
1981	Borgnefesse	Louis-Adhémar-Timothée Le Golif	Jean-Paul Audrain	
1981	Le Fétichiste	Michel Tournier	Anne Pekoslawska	
1982	L'Étang gris	Daniel Besnehard	Claude Yersin	
1983	La Silhouette et l'effigie	Théophile de Viau & Georges Perec	Jean-Pierre Sarrazac	
1983	La Ballade de Billy Peau	Argile	Bernard Lotti	
1983	La Rosalie, Printemps 17	Jean-Claude Frissung	Jean-Claude Frissung	
1983	Where the Cross Is Made	Eugene O'Neill	Claude Yersin	
1983	Actes relatifs à la vie, à la mort et à l'œuvre de Monsieur Raymond Roussel, homme de lettres	Raymond Roussel & Leonardo Sciascia	Michel Dubois	
1984	La Tour d'amour	Rachilde	Jeanne Champagne	
1984	Double Inconstancy	Pierre de Marivaux	Michel Dubois	
1986	La Chasse à l'amour	Violette Leduc	Agnès Célérier	
1986	A Sorrow Beyond Dreams	Peter Handke	Jeanne Champagne	
1987	La Ronde	Arthur Schnitzler	Alfredo Arias	
1988	La Reconstitution	Bernard Noël	Charles Tordjman	
1989	Le Prince travesti	Pierre de Marivaux	Jean-Louis Martinelli	
1990-1991	Bérénice	Jean Racine	Jacques Lassalle	
1991	L'Annonce faite à Marie	Paul Claudel	Philippe Adrien	
1991-1993	Quincailleries	Jacques Gamblin	Yves Babin	
1992	Vendredi, jour de liberté	Hugo Claus	Catherine de Seyne	
1992	The Playboy of the Western World	John Millington Synge	Philippe Adrien	
1994	Est-ouest	Georges Bensoussan	Jacques Gamblin	
1994	Gustave n'est pas moderne	Armando Llamas	Philippe Adrien	
1996	The Castle	Franz Kafka	Giorgio Barberio Corsetti	
1997	Le Toucher de la hanche	Jacques Gamblin	Jean-Michel Isabel	
1999-2001	Raisons de famille	Gérald Aubert	Gildas Bourdet	Nominated - Molière Award for Best Actor
2002	Maladie	Tanguy Viel	Jacques Gamblin	
2002	Clémence, à mon bras	Pierre Notte	Jacques Gamblin	
2003	Images	Armando Llamas	Jacques Gamblin	
2004-2006	Entre courir et voler y a qu'un pas papa	Jacques Gamblin	Claude Baqué	
2007	Confidences trop intimes	Jérôme Tonnerre	Patrice Leconte	Nominated - Molière Award for Best Actor
2007-2009	Les Diablogues	Roland Dubillard	Anne Bourgeois	
2008	Léger au front	Fernand Léger	Patrice Alexandre, David Chaillou, ...	
2010-2012	La nuit sera calme	Romain Gary	Jacques Gamblin	
2010-2012	Tout est normal, mon cœur scintille	Jacques Gamblin	Anne Bourgeois	
2011-2012	Gamblin jazze, de Wilde sextete	Jacques Gamblin	Jacques Gamblin	
2015	1 heure 23’14 et 7 centièmes	Bastien Lefèvre & Jacques Gamblin	Jacques Gamblin	Molière Award for Best Actor; Nominated - Molière Award for Best One-Man-Show
2015-2017	Ce que le djazz fait à ma djambe !	Jacques Gamblin	Jacques Gamblin	
2017-2018	Je parle à un homme qui ne tient pas en place	Jacques Gamblin	Jacques Gamblin	

== Filmography ==
Year	Title	Role	Director	Notes
1985	Hell Train		Roger Hanin	
1986	L'été 36	Alain Mercier	Yves Robert	TV movie
1989	Périgord noir	Rémi	Nicolas Ribowski	
1990	There Were Days... and Moons	Husband	Claude Lelouch	
1990	Le vagabond des mers		José Varela	TV Mini-Series
1991	Terre rouge	Tom	Jérôme Colin & Ève Heinrich	
1991	Années de plumes, années de plomb	Mahler	Nicolas Ribowski	TV movie
1992	Adeus Princesa	Helmut	Jorge Paixão da Costa	
1992	La Belle Histoire	The young cop	Claude Lelouch	
1992	Pont et soupirs	The man	Gilles Maillard	Short
1992	C'est mon histoire	Julien Delorme	Pierre Joassin	TV series (1 episode)
1993	Fausto	Fausto's father	Rémy Duchemin	
1993	La femme à abattre	Cow-Boy	Guy Pinon	
1993	Tout ça... pour ça !	Jacques Grandin	Claude Lelouch	
1993	Un cercueil pour deux		Jean-Louis Fournier	TV movie
1994	Les Braqueuses	Thierry	Jean-Paul Salomé	
1994	Naissances		Frédéric Graziani	Short
1994	Les brouches	Pierre	Alain Tasma	TV movie
1994	Couchettes express	Antoine	Luc Béraud	TV movie
1995	Les Misérables	The beadle	Claude Lelouch	
1995	Au petit Marguery	Barnabé	Laurent Bénégui	
1995	À la vie, à la mort!	Patrick	Robert Guédiguian	
1995	Sans souci		Jean-Michel Isabel	Short
1996	My Man	4th Client	Bertrand Blier	
1996	Pédale douce	Adrien Lemoine	Gabriel Aghion	Nominated - César Award for Best Supporting Actor
1996	Une histoire d'amour à la con	Gérard Delmont	Henri-Paul Korchia	
1996	La bougeotte	Pierre	Jean-Claude Morin	TV movie
1996	Les clients d'Avrenos	Bernard de Jonsac	Philippe Venault	TV movie
1997	Mauvais genre	Martial Bok	Laurent Bénégui	
1997	Tenue correcte exigée	Richard Poulenc	Philippe Lioret	
1997	Le leçon de Monsieur Paillasson		Michel Fessler	Short
1998	Dr. Akagi	Pete	Shohei Imamura	
1999	The Color of Lies	René Sterne	Claude Chabrol	
1999	The Children of the Marshland	Garris	Jean Becker	Cabourg Film Festival - Best Actor
2001	Bella ciao	Orfeo Mancini	Stéphane Giusti	
2001	Mademoiselle	Pierre Cassini	Philippe Lioret	
2002	Carnage	Jacques	Delphine Gleize	
2002	Safe Conduct	Jean Devaivre	Bertrand Tavernier	Berlin International Film Festival - Silver Bear for Best Actor
2003	Dissonances	Nat	Jérôme Cornuau	
2003	The Car Keys	Himself	Laurent Baffie	
2003	À la petite semaine	Francis	Sam Karmann	
2004	Holy Lola	Dr. Pierre Ceyssac	Bertrand Tavernier	
2004	25 degrés en hiver	Miguel	Stéphane Vuillet	
2004	Le voyageur sans bagage	Gaston	Pierre Boutron	TV movie
2005	Hell	Pierre	Danis Tanović	
2006	Serko	Fragonard	Joël Farges	
2006	Les irréductibles	Michel	Renaud Bertrand	
2006	Les Brigades du Tigre	Jules Bonnot	Jérôme Cornuau	
2007	Fragile(s)	Vince	Martin Valente	
2007	Nos retrouvailles	Gabriel	David Oelhoffen	
2007	The Merry Widow	Léo Labaume	Isabelle Mergault	
2007	Les oubliées	Captain Christian Janvier	Hervé Hadmar	TV Mini-Series
2008	The First Day of the Rest of Your Life	Robert Duval	Rémi Bezançon	Nominated - César Award for Best Actor
2009	Bellamy	Noël Gentil	Claude Chabrol	
2009	Moi, Van Gogh	Vincent van Gogh	François Bertrand	Short
2010	Nous trois	The father	Renaud Bertrand	
2010	The Names of Love	Arthur Martin	Michel Leclerc	Nominated - César Award for Best Actor
2011	The First Man	Jacques Cormery	Gianni Amelio	
2011	Holidays by the Sea	Monsieur Cerf-volant	Pascal Rabaté	
2011	L'infiltré	Michel Carrat	Giacomo Battiato	TV movie
2011	Une vie française	Paul Blick	Jean-Pierre Sinapi	TV movie
2012	Blind Man	Commandant Lassalle	Xavier Palud	
2013	The Finishers	Paul Amblard	Nils Tavernier	
2013	Le jour attendra	Victor	Edgar Marie	
2014	24 Days	Commandant Delcour	Alexandre Arcady	
2014	Hippocrate	Professor Barois	Thomas Lilti	
2014	Weekends in Normandy	Jean	Anne Villacèque	
2015	En sortant de l'école	Narrator	Charlotte Cambon, Alix Fizet, ...	TV series (13 episodes)
2016	Père Fils Thérapie!	Charles Perronet	Émile Gaudreault	
2016	Blaise	Jacques	Dimitri Planchon	TV series (30 episodes)
2018	L'incroyable histoire du facteur Cheval	Joseph-Ferdinand Cheval	Nils Tavernier	
