= Monory =

Monory may refer to:

- René Monory (1923–2009), French centre-right politician
- Jacques Monory (1924–2018), French painter, living in Cachan
