= Richard Lindner (painter) =

American painter (1901–1978)

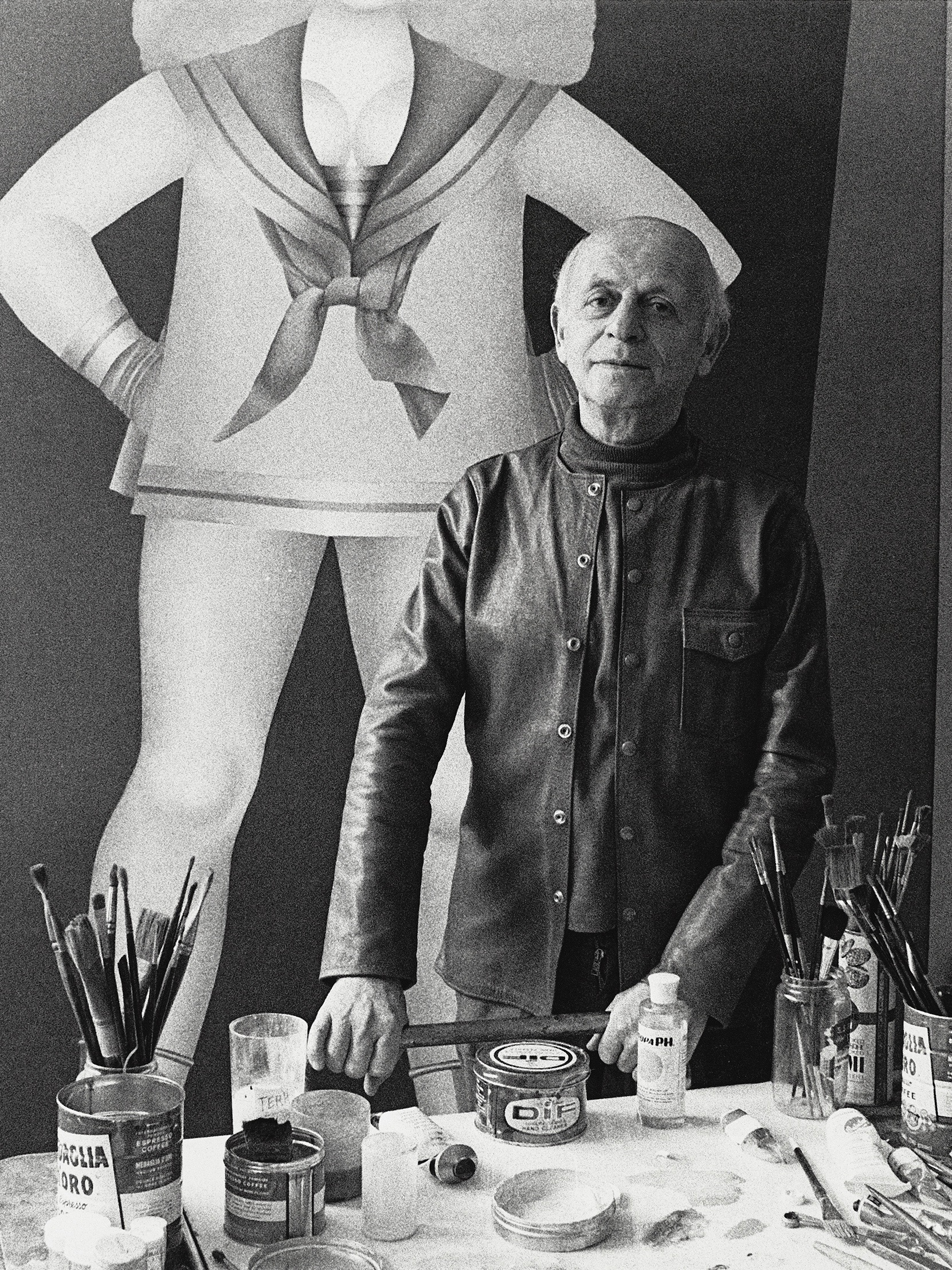
- Painter Richard Lindner posing in his studio, in front of his current work, Girl with Green Hair, 1972.
- Born: November 11, 1901; Hamburg, Germany
- Died: April 16, 1978 (aged 76)
- Education: Kunstgewerbeschule (Arts and Crafts School), Kunstakademie.
- Known for: Painting

Richard Lindner (November 11, 1901 – April 16, 1978) was a German-American painter.

== Biography ==
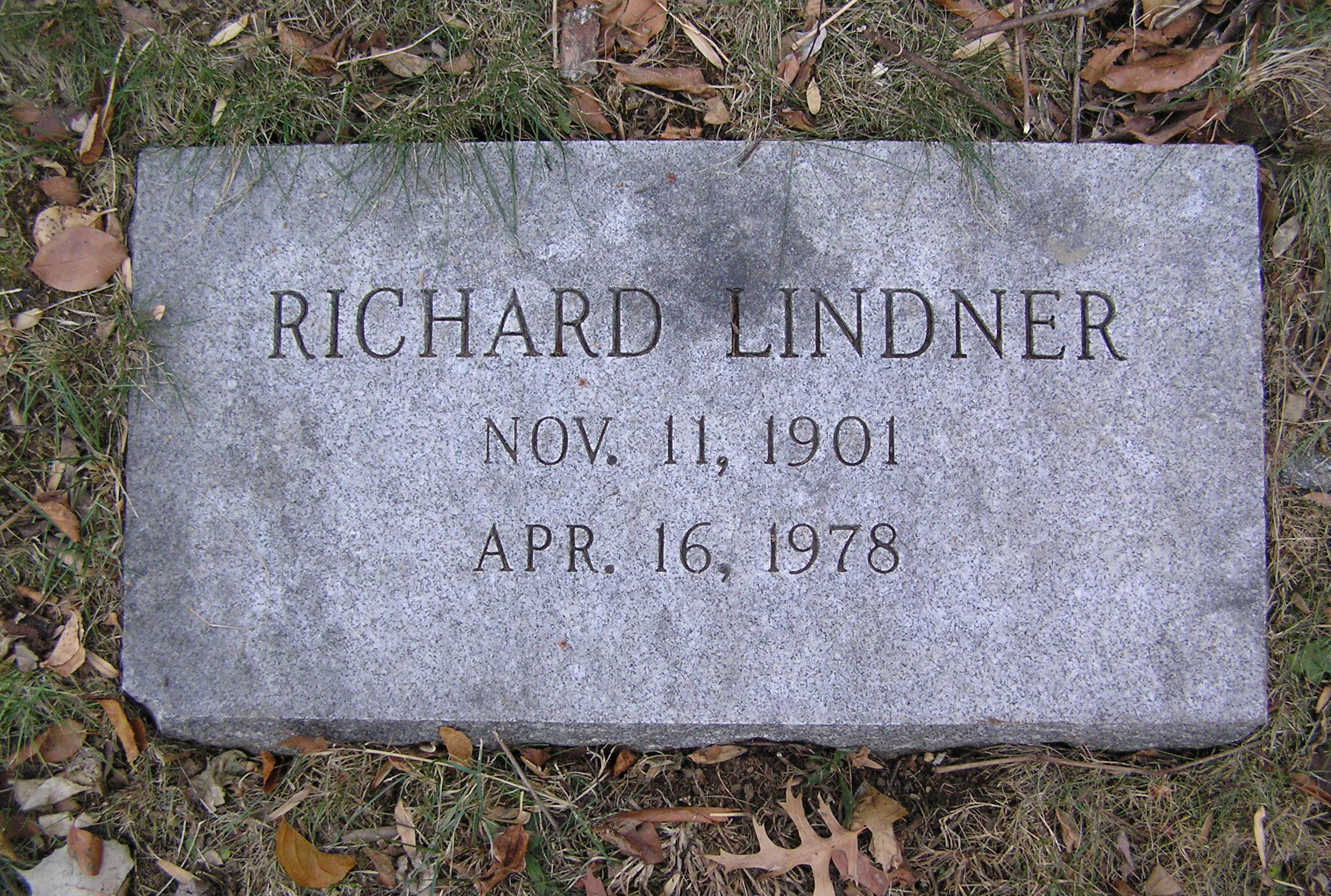
Richard Lindner's headstone

Richard Lindner was born in Hamburg, Germany. His mother Mina Lindner was American and born in New York as the daughter of German parents.

In 1905, the family moved to Nuremberg, where Lindner's mother was owner of a custom-fitting corset business and Richard Lindner grew up and studied at the Kunstgewerbeschule (Arts and Crafts School), now the Academy of Fine Arts Nuremberg. From 1924 to 1927, he lived in Munich and began studies there at the Kunstakademie in 1925. In 1927, Lindner moved to Berlin and stayed there until 1928, when he returned to Munich to become art director of a publishing firm. He remained in Munich until 1933, when he was forced to flee to Paris. Once in Paris, Lindner became politically engaged, sought contact with French artists, and earned his living as a commercial artist. He was interned when World War II broke out in 1939 and later served in the French Army.

In 1941, Lindner moved to the United States and worked in New York City as an illustrator of books and magazines. There he made contact with New York artists and German emigrants such as Albert Einstein, Marlene Dietrich, and Saul Steinberg. In 1948, Lindner became an American citizen.

In 1952, Lindner started teaching at the Pratt Institute, Brooklyn. In 1957, Lindner received the William and Norma Copley Foundation Award. In 1965, he became a guest professor at the Hochschule für Bildende Künste in Hamburg. His paintings at this time used the sexual symbolism of advertising and investigated definitions of gender roles in the media. In 1967, Lindner moved to Yale University School of Art and Architecture, New Haven.

Richard Lindner died in 1978. He was buried at Westchester Hills Cemetery in Hastings-on-Hudson, New York.

== Art ==
"The artistic universe of Richard Lindner is unique: he is highly genuine, he is full of urban energy, and he is driven by weird eroticism.... Richard Lindner started his career as an artist eventually at the age of 40 in New York. In this metropolitan jungle Lindner created his oeuvre: exciting and powerful images of robot like figures, amazons and heroines, harlequins of self-styled heroes — his artistic panorama of the unruly '60s and '70s of the 20th century" (sic) (Claus Clement quoted in Richard Lindner –Paintings, Works on Paper, Graphic, Nuremberg 2001). One of Lindner's paintings, Boy With Machine, 1954, appears on the cover of Deleuze's Anti-Oedipus and thus the image has formed part of many readers' introduction to Deleuze's later and more accessible philosophy.

== In popular culture ==
- Richard Lindner appeared in the second row on The Beatles's Sgt. Pepper's Lonely Hearts Club Band album cover.
- Richard Lindner's Boy with Machine is the first quote of Gilles Deleuze's Anti-Oedipus.
- The Couple appears in the video for Bob Dylan's "Jokerman."

== (selected) Bibliography ==
- Sidney Tillim, Lindner, London, 1961.
- Dore Ashton, Richard Lindner, New York, 1969.
- Rolf Gunter Dienst, Richard Lindner, New York, 1969.
- Hilton Kramer, Richard Lindner, New York Graphic Society, Boston, 1975. ISBN 0-8212-0513-7.
- James Lord, Regard vers l'invisible / Looking at the invisible in: Derrière le miroir, n°226, Paris: Maeght Editeur, December 1977, ISBN 2-85587-038-0. (Text in French and English.)
- Eugène Ionesco, Saul Steinberg, Richard Lindner, in: Derrière le miroir, n°241, Paris: Maeght Editeur, October 1980, ISBN 2-85587-079-8. (Text in French and English.)
- Richard Lindner, Catalogue Raisonné of Paintings, Watercolours, and Drawings, edited by Werner Spies, compiled by Claudia Loyall, Munich, London, New York, 1999 (ISBN 3-7913-2085-8).
- Richard Lindner: Paintings, Works on Paper, Graphic, edited by Klaus D. Bode, Nuremberg 2001, ISBN 3-934065-07-4.
- Daniel Marchesseau, Richard Lindner – Adults Only, exhibition catalogue, Musée de la Vie romantique, Paris-Musées, 2005, (ISBN 978-2-87900-870-7).
- Jean-François Lyotard, "Lindner's Crazy Girls" in: Jean-François Lyotard, Miscellaneous Texts II: Contemporary Artists (Leuven University Press, 2012) ISBN 978-90-586-7886-7.
