= Argile =

French poetry and art magazine

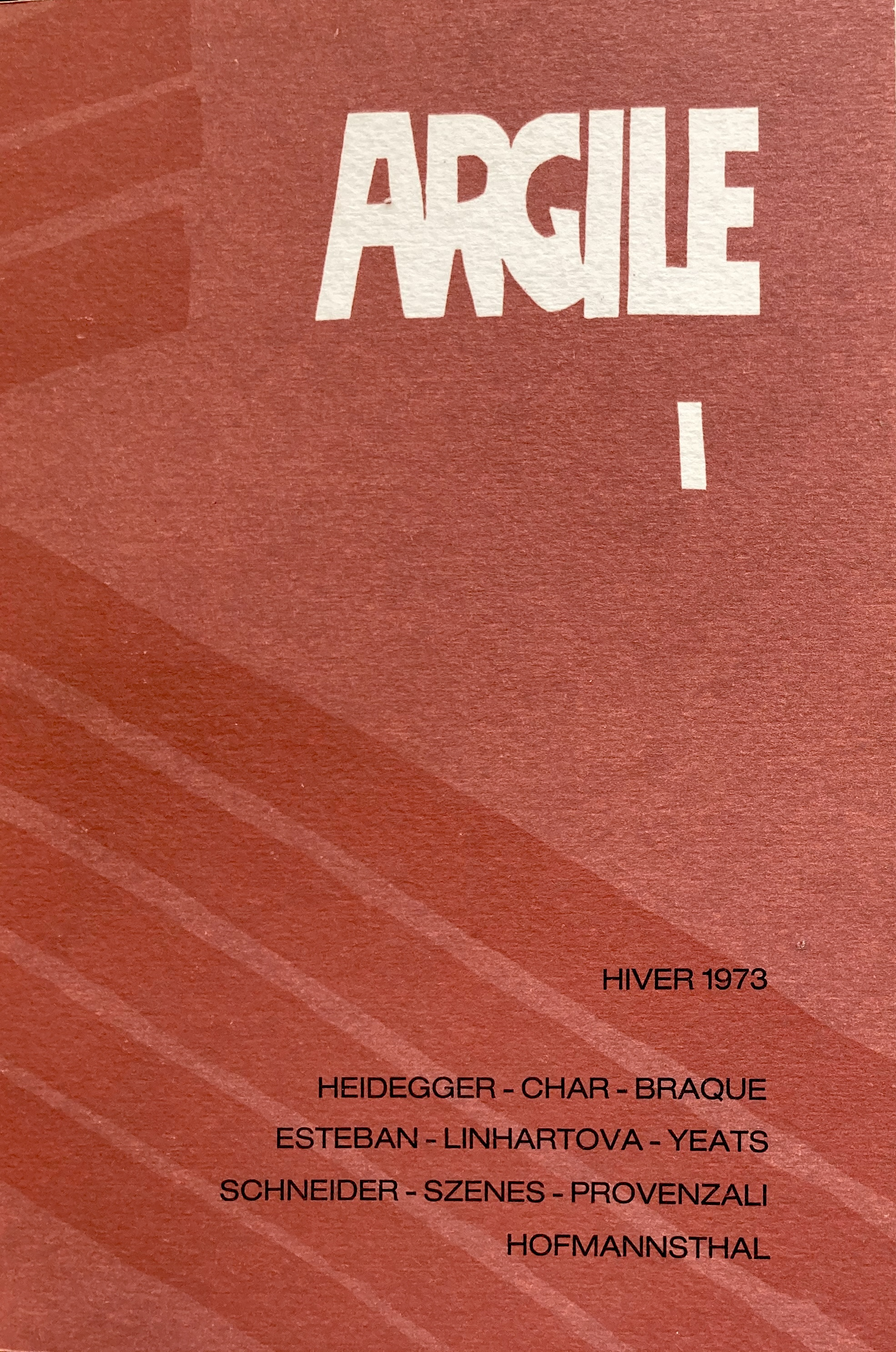

Argile was a French poetry and art magazine, which was published by Maeght between 1973 and 1981 in Paris, France.

== History and profile ==
Argile was founded in Paris in 1973 by Claude Esteban at the request of Aimé Maeght after the magazine L'Éphémère had ceased publication in 1972. Argile was published from winter 1973 to its 24th issue in 1981.
