= Blind Man (film) =

- Film poster
- French: À l'aveugle
- Directed by: Xavier Palud
- Written by: Éric Besnard; Luc Besson
- Produced by: Luc Besson
- Starring: Jacques Gamblin; Lambert Wilson
- Cinematography: Michel Amathieu
- Edited by: Julien Rey; Stéphane Garnier
- Music by: Laurent Couson
- Release date: 7 March 2012
- Running time: 94 minutes
- Country: France
- Language: French

Blind Man (French: À l'aveugle) is a 2012 French thriller film directed by Xavier Palud.

== Cast ==
- Jacques Gamblin as Commandant Lassalle
- Lambert Wilson as Narvik
- Raphaëlle Agogué as Héloïse
- Arnaud Cosson as Vermulen
- Antoine Levannier as Simon
- Frédéric Kontogom as Briand
- Pascal Demolon as Warnas
