= István Beöthy =

Hungarian sculptor and architect

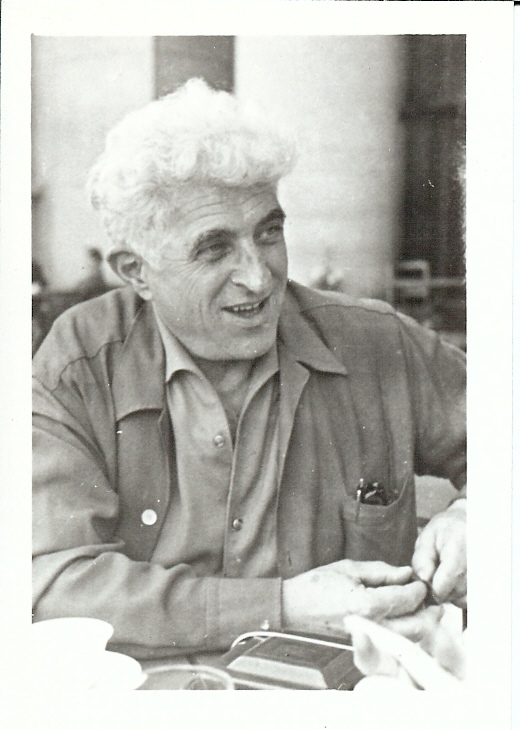
- Movement: constructivist Abstraction-Creation

István (Etienne) Beöthy (1897 – 27 November 1961) was a Hungarian sculptor and architect who mainly lived and worked in France.

== Biography ==
After the First World War, in which he served, Beöthy began to study architecture in Budapest. There he was in contact with the avant-garde poet and painter Lajos Kassák, who familiarized him with the tenets of constructivism and suprematism. His earliest work as an architectural draftsman, from 1919, displayed constructivist tendencies. In that same year he would write the manifesto "Section d'Or" (The Golden Section), which did not appear in Paris until 1939.

From 1920 to 1924, Beöthy studied under János Vaszary at the Hungarian University of Fine Arts. He travelled on a grant to Vienna, from where he undertook other travels to western Europe, until in 1925 he settled in Paris. Beöthy found a place in the Parisian art scene and took part in the exhibit of the Salon des Indépendants. In 1927 he married Anna Steiner, and in 1928 he had his first one-man show in the Galerie Sacre-Printemps.

In 1931, Beöthy co-founded the group Abstraction-Creation with sculptor Georges Vantongerloo and painter Auguste Herbin, and was its vice-president for a time. From 1931 to 1939, he had an exclusive contract with Leonce Rosenberg's Galerie de l'Effort Moderne, and in 1938 he organized an exhibit in Budapest, which was the first exposure of his nonfigurative art to the public in Hungary. Like Herbin, he later explored parallels to other forms of self-expression, particularly music. His sculptures after this point develop along the lines of harmonies, which interact with each other like musical notes.

During World War II Beöthy designed fliers for the French Resistance. In 1946, he became a founding member of the Salon des Réalités Nouvelles, and the Galerie Maeght in Paris showed a retrospective of his work. In 1951, he became a founding member of another group, "Espace", and founded the journal "Formes et Vie", with Fernand Léger and Le Corbusier. For a short time between 1952 and 1953, he gave lectures on color and proportion to architecture classes at the École des Beaux-Arts, and in his subsequent years he worked together with architects and was otherwise part of the planning for the expansion of Le Havre.

Beöthy died in Paris on 27 November 1961.

== Exhibits ==
- 1928: Galerie Sacre du Printemps, Paris
- 1929: Galerie Zak, Paris
- 1930: Galerie Bonaparte, Paris
- 1931: Salon Kovács Á., Budapest
- 1934: Abstraction-Création, Paris
- 1942: Centre d'Etudes Hongroises, Paris
- 1946: Galerie Denise René, Paris
- 1948: Galerie Maeght, Paris
- 1952: La Librairie des Archers, Lyon
- 1953: Galerie Ex-Libris, Antwerp, Brussels
- 1958: Berri-Lardy, Paris
- 1974: Galerie Gmurzynska-Bagera, Köln
- 1979: Skulpturen-Museum, Marl
- 1983: Janus Pannonius Múzeum, Pécs
- 1985: Beothy et l'avant-garde hongroise, Galerie Franka Berndt, Paris
- 1990: Musée d'Art Moderne, Grenoble
- 1991: Galerie Franka Berndt, Paris
