= Staël =

Staël is a surname. Notable people with the surname include:

- Anne Louise Germaine de Staël (“Madame de Staël”) (1766–1817), French woman of letters and political theorist
- Nicolas de Staël (1914–1955), French painter of Russian origin
- Staël von Holstein, Baltic German baronial family
