= Pierre Tal-Coat =

French artist (1905–1985)

- Born: Pierre Louis Jacob; 12 December 1905; Clohars-Carnoet, France
- Died: 12 June 1985 (aged 79); Saint-Pierre de Bailleul
- Known for: Painting, printmaking
- Movement: Tachisme

Pierre Tal-Coat (real name Pierre Louis Jacob; 1905–1985) was a French artist considered to be one of the founders of Tachisme.

== Life and work ==
He was born the son of a fisherman, in the village of Clohars-Carnoët, Finistère in 1905. He attended primary school from 1912 to 1914. In 1915, during World War I, his father was killed in fighting at the Argonne front. Apprenticed as a blacksmith in 1918, he began designing and sculpting and was rewarded with a national scholarship and entered the Upper primary school at Quimperlé. He started his working life as clerk to a notary in 1923 in Arzano. In 1924, he found work as a decorator at the Keraluc porcelain factory in Quimper in 1924, creating characters and landscapes of the Brittany countryside.

Arriving in Paris in 1924, Tal-Coat modelled for the Académie de la Grande Chaumiere, was a moulder at the Manufacture de Sèvres and met with the painter Émile Compard. In 1925 and 1926 he fulfilled his military service in Paris in the cuirassiers. He met Auguste Fabre and Henri Bénézit and exhibited in their gallery under the name of Tal-Coat (Wood Face in Breton) which he used all his life to avoid homonymy with the poet Max Jacob. Back in Paris in 1930, after a stay back home in Brittany from 1927 to 1929, he mixed with such notables as Francis Gruber, André Marchand, Gertrude Stein, Francis Picabia, Ernest Hemingway, Giacometti, Balthus, Artaud, Tzara and Paul-Émile Victor. From 1932 he was a member of the Forces Nouvelles group. In 1936, he protested against the Spanish Civil War with his “Massacres” series.

He was conscripted into the army in 1939 at Saint-Germain-en-Laye and later Ermenonville and demobilized in 1940 in Montauban. Setting himself up in Aix-en-Provence, which had become the refuge of many artists, including André Marchand, Charles Albert Cingria and Cendrars, he participated in the exhibition "Twenty young painters of French tradition" organized by Jean Bazaine in 1941 and later exhibited at the Galerie de France in 1943. Returning to Paris in 1945, he participated in the first exhibition of the Salon de Mai.

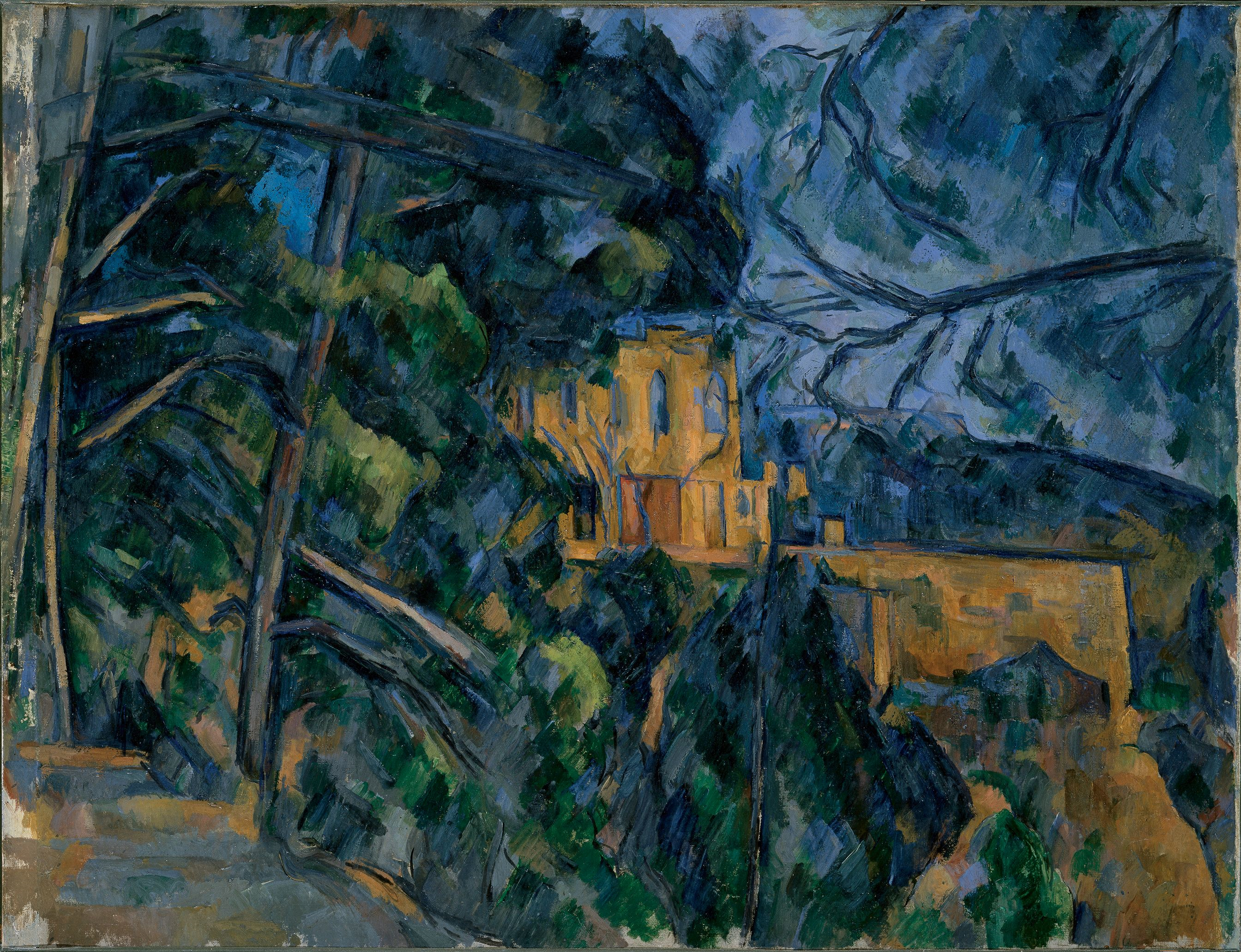
Paul Cézanne, Le Château Noir (1900-1904), where Tal Coat lived in 1946.

He returned the following year to Aix, staying at the Chateau Noir, where Cézanne stayed when painting at Tholonet and met André Masson, philosopher Henri Maldiney and the poet André du Bouchet who became his close friends. His paintings by now had become non-figurative.

Along with the artists of the new School of Paris, the Galerie de France (from 1943 to 1965), the Galerie Maeght (from 1954 to 1974), Benador (from 1970 to 1980), the HM gallery, the Clivage gallery and the Berthet-Aittouarès gallery all regularly exhibited his paintings. In 1956 six of his paintings were shown at the Venice Biennale with those of Jacques Villon and Bernard Buffet. In 1963 he collaborated alongside Joan Miró and Ubac in the creation of the Maeght foundation. He designed a wall mosaic for the entrance in 1968 and received the Grand Prix National des Arts. A large retrospective exhibition devoted to his work, was held at the Grand Palais in Paris in 1976.

== Death ==
In 1961, Tal-Coat bought the Dormont Carthusian building at Saint-Pierre-de-Bailleul near Vernon in Normandy. He died there in the summer of 1985.

== Works ==
Tal-Coat worked in a number of series, notably:

- 1936-1937 : Séries des Massacres (Spanish Civil War)
- 1938-1939 : Séries de Paysages (Bretagne, Bourgogne,Île de France)
- 1942 : Séries de Natures mortes
- 1945-1946 : Séries des Poissons et des Aquariums
- 1946 : Séries des Mouvements d'eau et des Rochers
- 1952-1953 : Séries des Passages et des Signes
- 1958 : Séries des Lignes de pierre et de silex, des Troupeaux et des Vols
- 1961 : Séries des Colzas et des Coquelicots
- 1983 : Séries des Portraits d'oiseaux
- 1984 : Séries des Sols

Book illustrations include the following authors:

- André du Bouchet (Cette surface, 1956; Sur le pas, 1959; Laisses, 1975; Où le soleil, 1978; Sous le linteau en forme de joug, 1978; Une tache, 1988; Deux traces vertes, 1991),
- Pierre Schneider (Traverse d'un plateau, 1963),
- Pierre Torreilles (Espace déluté, 1974),
- Philippe Jaccottet (A travers un verger, 1975),
- Claude Esteban (Veilleurs aux confins, 1978),
- Maurice Blanchot (Le Dernier à parler, 1984),
- Yves Peyré (Le Lointain foyer du jour, 1984), Pierre Lecuire (Bestiaire, 1985),
- Jacques Chessex (La Bête de Tal Coat, 1998; Sur une gravure de Tal-Coat, 1998).

== Bibliography ==
- Tal-Coat, texte de Jacques Lassaigne, Galerie de France, Paris, 1943.
- "Three Dialogues." The first one is on Tal Coat. Text by Samuel Beckett. Paris, 1949. In Samuel Beckett, Disjecta, ed. Ruby Cohn (London, 2001).
- Tal-Coat, texte de Henri Maldiney, Galerie de France, Paris, 1950.
- Tal-Coat, texte de Henri Maldiney et André du Bouchet, « Derrière le miroir », n° 64, Maeght éditeur, Paris, 1954.
- Tal-Coat, textes de Georges Duthuit et Georges Limbour, « Derrière le miroir », n° 82-84, Maeght éditeur, Paris, 1956.
- Tal-Coat, texte de Henri Maldiney, « Derrière le miroir », n° 114, Maeght éditeur, Paris, 1959.
- Tal-Coat, dessins d'Aix, texte de Pierre Schneider, « Derrière le miroir », n° 120, Maeght éditeur, Paris, 1960.
- Georges Charbonnier, Entretien avec Pierre Tal Coat, dans « Le Monologue du peintre », vol. II, Julliard, Paris, 1960; réédition Guy Durier, 1980.
- Tal-Coat, texte de Charles Estienne, « Derrière le miroir », n° 131, Maeght éditeur, Paris, 1962.
- Pierre Tal Coat, dessins, galerie Beno d’Incelli, Paris, 1964.
- Tal-Coat, texte de Henri Maldiney, « Derrière le miroir », n° 153, Maeght éditeur, Paris, 1965.
- Tal-Coat, 30 ans de dessins, Palais de l’Europe, Menton, 1969.
- Tal-Coat, peintures, dessins, gravures, galerie Benador, Genève, 1970.
- Tal-Coat, textes de Pierre Tal Coat, "Derrière le miroir", n° 199, Maeght éditeur, Paris, 1972
- Tal-Coat, peintures, galerie Maeght, Zürich, 1974.
- Tal-Coat, textes de Raoul-Jean Moulin et André Du Bouchet, notes de Tal-Coat, Grand Palais, Centre Georges Pompidou, Paris, 1976, 128 p. ISBN 2-85850-006-1.
- Tal-Coat, extrait de la correspondance de Tal Coat, Galerie de France et du Bénélux, Bruxelles, 1976.
- Tal-Coat, parcours 1945-1983, musée d’Évreux,1983.
- Tal-Coat, galerie Patrice Trigano, Paris, 1983.
- Michel Dieuzaide, Vers la courbure : l’atelier de Pierre Tal-Coat, Clivages, Paris, 1983.
- Christine Martinent, L’oeuvre de Pierre Tal-Coat de 1950 à 1980, thèse de doctorat de 3e cycle sous la direction de Fanette Roche, université de Paris I-Panthéon-Sorbonne, 1983.
- Tal-Coat, 1964-1984, texte de Raoul-Jean Moulin, Centre culturel Noroit, Arras, 1984.
- Claude Esteban, « Démarches de la nudité », dans Traces, figures, traversées : essais sur la peinture contemporaine, Paris, Galilée, 1985, p. 171-176.
- Tal-Coat, gravures 1970-1984, Cabinet des estampes du Musée d’art et d’histoire, Genève, 1985.
- Hommage à Pierre Tal Coat, musée des Beaux-Arts, Quimper, 1985.
- Tal-Coat, lavis, peintures, maison de la Culture, Bourges, 1987.
- Tal-Coat, rétrospective des dessins et oeuvres sur papier, Musée municipal et Bibliothèque municipale, Rennes, 1988.
- Tal-Coat, oeuvres de 1926 à 1946, galerie Fanny Guillon-Laffaille, Paris, 1989.
- Tal-Coat, oeuvres de 1948 à 1965, galerie Fanny Guillon-Laffaille, Paris, 1990.
- Tal-Coat, lavis et aquarelles, textes de Jean-Claude Schneider, Jean-Pascal Léger, et Jean-Pierre Greff, musée Matisse, Le Cateau-Cambrésis, 1991.
- Cati Chambon, L'oeuvre gravé de Pierre Tal-Coat, mémoire de DEA sous la direction de Bruno Foucart, Université de Paris IV-Sorbonne, 1991.
- Jean Guichard-Meili, L'Homme, 21 dessins de Tal Coat, Porte du Sud, Villeneuve-sur-Yonne, 1992.
- Jean Leymarie, Tal-Coat, Skira, Genève, 1992.
- Henri Maldiney, Aux déserts que l’histoire accable : l’art de Tal-Coat, Deyrolle, Cognac, 1995.
- Pierre Tal-Coat, les années Provence, Espace 13, Aix-en-Provence, 1996.
- Tal-Coat, devant l’image, Genève, musées de Genève, Colmar, Antibes, Winterthur, 1997-98.
- Tal-Coat, galerie Berthet Aittouares, Paris, 1997.
- Portraits de Pierre Tal-Coat, texte d'Emmanuel Pernoud, Bibliothèque Nationale de France, Paris, 1999.
- Pierre Tal-Coat, textes de Yves Peyré et Pierre Tal-Coat, Galerie Berthet-Aittouarès, Paris, 2002.
