= Alain Madeleine-Perdrillat =

French art historian

Alain Madeleine-Perdrillat (7 September 1949, Paris) is a French art historian.

== Biography ==
Alain Madeleine-Perdrillat led the Communications Department of the Réunion des Musées Nationaux for several years then the communication service of the institut national d'histoire de l'art.

He is the author of a monograph on Seurat (Skira, 1990), a study of the correspondence of Nicolas de Staël (Hazan, 2003) as well as popular books on painting.

A poetry lover, he wrote in journals about Yves Bonnefoy and Philippe Jaccottet. He also translated Masolino et Masaccio by Roberto Longhi (1981).

== Publications ==
- 1990: Seurat, Skira
- 1994: Un dimanche avec Vermeer, Skira.
- 1994: Un dimanche au Louvre, Skira.
- 1994: Un dimanche avec Cézanne, Skira.
- 2003: Nicolas de Staël, Hazan.
- 2004: De longues absences suivi de Treize poèmes d'hiver en Corrèze, La Dogana.
- 2010: Laurent de La Hyre, La Mort des enfants de Béthel, éditions Invenit.
- 2011: La vie d'un peintre par Gino Sévérini, Hazan.
- 2013: Alexandre Hollan : L'expérience de voir (sous la direction), Somogy Éditions d'Art.
- 2015: Damiers, avec des Textes d'Yves Bonnefoy et Alain Madeleine-Perdrillat, Cendres.
