= Pol Bury =

Belgian sculptor (1922–2005)

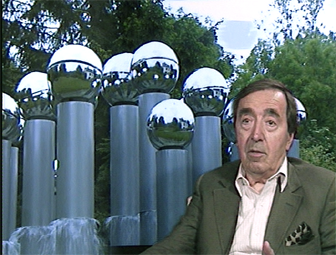
Portrait of Pol Bury

Pol Bury (26 April 1922 – 28 September 2005) was a Belgian sculptor who began his artistic career as a painter in the Jeune Peintre Belge and COBRA groups. Among his most famous works is the fountain-sculpture L'Octagon, located in San Francisco.

In 1999, Louis Stern Fine Arts in West Hollywood, California, in cooperation with Galerie Louis Carré & Cie, Paris, exhibited Pol Bury: Fountains and Other Intriguing Works. This exhibition was part of the Absolut-L.A. International Biennial Art Invitational, which was also known as the L.A. International. The exhibition received a favorable review by critic David Pagel from the Los Angeles Times.

His work was included in a 2008 auction at Christie's, the lot said to be the first of its kind in this kind of work. Among other locations, Bury's work is included in the Chelsea Art Museum's permanent collection.
