= Pablo Palazuelo =

Spanish painter

Pablo Palazuelo (October 8, 1915 – October 3, 2007) was a Spanish painter and sculptor.

== Work and biography ==
Pabich led to an invitation to join the Galérie Maeght (currently Galérie Lelong), an association that has continued for some fifty years. Palazuelo went on to receive the Kandinsky Prize in 1952. His attention became focused on the nature of "form" itself rather than on what it represented. In 1953 his investigation into form led to his discovery: Trans-geometría-the rhythms of nature translated into plastic art. This new way of seeing was initially expressed in his Solitudes series shown in his first solo exhibition in 1955.

Ascendente no. 2, his first sculpture, appeared in 1954. In 1962 that his exploration of the qualities of space through his metal sculpture began in earnest, and his two-dimensional drawings became transformed into their three-dimensional counterparts. Conflict between large, flat, colorful forms characterized the series entitled Onda, Onfalo and Tierra, exhibited in 1963, and indicated a significant change in the direction of his art. In 1969 Pablo Palazuelo returned to Spain, where he continued to probe the mysteries of form through his paintings, sculptures, writings and research. He began to work in a 14th-century castle in Monroy, near Cáceres in 1974. During this time he captured the phenomenon of transformation, from its origin to its cyclic end, in his Monroy series.

The appearance of "signs" in his El número y las aguas series in 1978 marked another level of his inquiry into "the moment of formation." Palazuelo's Yantra paintings, exhibited in 1985, represented diagrams of two-dimensional force and structures of three-dimensional force, which constituted figures of conception. Constantly changing lineal rhythms characterized his Nigredo, Anamne and Sinesis series, which were exhibited at the Galería Soledad Lorenzo in Madrid. Since 1955 Palazuelo has held twenty-three solo exhibitions, as well as numerous group exhibitions in France, Spain and throughout Europe. Palazuelo continued to explore the potentialities of form in his Sydus series.

== Exhibitions ==
His work was also periodically displayed in group exhibitions in the United States between 1953 and 1975. In 1958 he received the Fifth Carnegie Prize for his work Mandala at the Pittsburgh Museum of Art (Carnegie Institute). Pablo Palazuelo received several awards for his work, including Spain's National Award for Plastic Arts in 1999, and was regarded as one of the preeminent Spanish artists of this century. He died on October 3, 2007, in Madrid.

From 22 June - 30 October 2010, the Museu Fundación Juan March, Palma exhibited Pablo Palazuelo. Paris, 13 rue Saint-Jacques (1948-1968). The show was organized with the Fundación-Museo Jorge Oteiza and focused on the works Palazuelo created while in Paris. The show traveled to the Museo de Arte Abstracto Español, Cuenca (19 November 2010 - 27 February 2011) and Fundación-Museo Jorge Oteiza, Pamplona (11 March - 29 May 2011).
