= Paul Rebeyrolle =

French painter

Paul Rebeyrolle (3 November 1926 in Eymoutiers – 7 February 2005 in Côte-d'Or) was a French painter.

== Life and works ==
As a child he had tuberculosis of the bone, which caused him long periods of immobility. Later he studied in Limoges and joined the French Communist Party. He ultimately broke with the party because of events related to the Hungarian Revolution of 1956.

His art was often concerned with landscapes, but marked by violence and rage. He received praise from François Pinault, Jean-Paul Sartre, Michel Foucault and others. Some of his famous works are called "Frogs" 1966, "Still Life" 1966, and "Trout" 1956.

== Where to see his works ==
Rebeyrolle has his own Museum, the "Espace Paul Rebeyrolle", located near his birthplace, in Eymoutiers (30 miles east of Limoges).
