= Galerie Maeght =

Modern art gallery in Paris, France and Barcelona, Spain

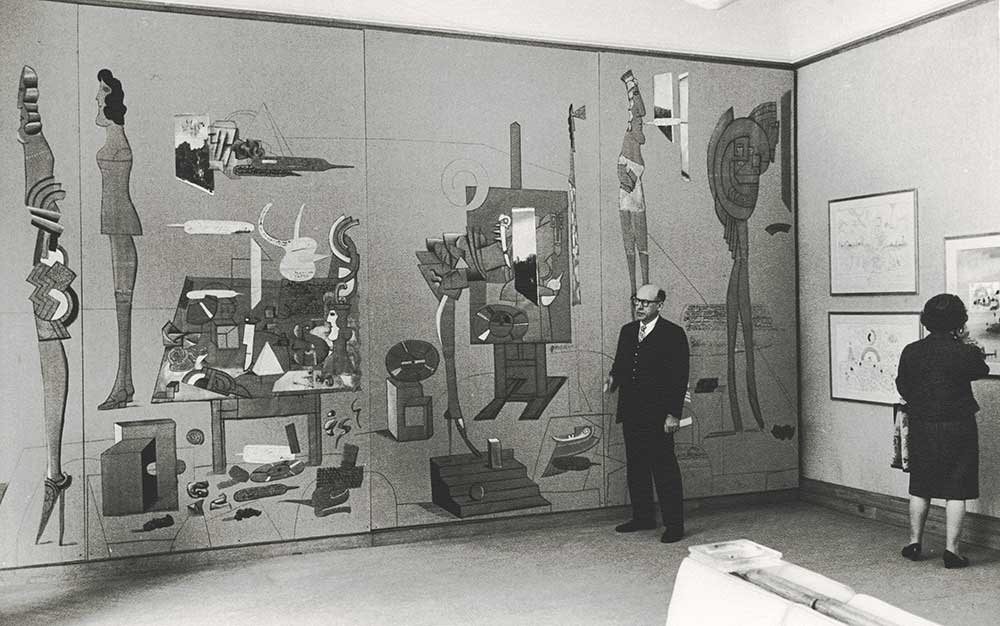
- Saul Steinberg exhibition, 1966
- Established: 1936
- Location: 42, rue du Bac, Paris VII, France
- Type: Art gallery
- Collection size: Modern art
- Founder: Aimé Maeght
- Director: Isabelle Maeght
- Website: www.maeght.com

The Galerie Maeght (French pronunciation: [ɡalʁi maɡ]) is a gallery of modern art in Paris, (Note: Formerly in rue de Téheran, Paris VIII; later at 42, rue du Bac, Paris VII.) France, and Barcelona, Catalonia, Spain. The gallery was founded in 1936 in Cannes. The Paris gallery was started in 1946 by Aimé Maeght. The gallery represents artists primarily from France and Spain.

== History ==
The Maeght Gallery opened in Paris in December 1945 with an exhibition of Henri Matisse's work. Beginning in 1946, Bonnard, Braque, Marchand, Rouault, and Baya held their first exhibitions at the Paris gallery. In 1949, the gallery hosted The First Masters of Abstract Art, featuring Andry-Farcy's collection from the Grenoble museum.

In 1956, Paule and Adrien Maeght opened their own gallery at 42, rue du Bac in Paris, with an exhibition by Alberto Giacometti. The gallery introduced a new generation of Maeght artists: Kelly, Cortot, Bazaine, Derain, Tal-Coat, Palazuelo, Chillida, Ubac, Fiedler. They were joined in 1966 by Bacon, Riopelle, Tàpies, Rebeyrolle, Bury, Adami, and Monory.

In 1964, Adrien Maeght established the ARTE printing house in Paris, which has produced all Maeght editions since. Maeght Éditeur published more than 12,000 titles.

Today, the Maeght gallery and the editions are managed by Isabelle Maeght. Exhibitions show works by artists such as Miró, Calder, Braque, Matisse, Chagall, Tàpies, Chillida, Gasiorowski, Rebeyrolle, Monory, Del Re, Depin, Doerflinger, Couturier, and Levy.
