= Jacques Monory =

French painter (1924–2018)

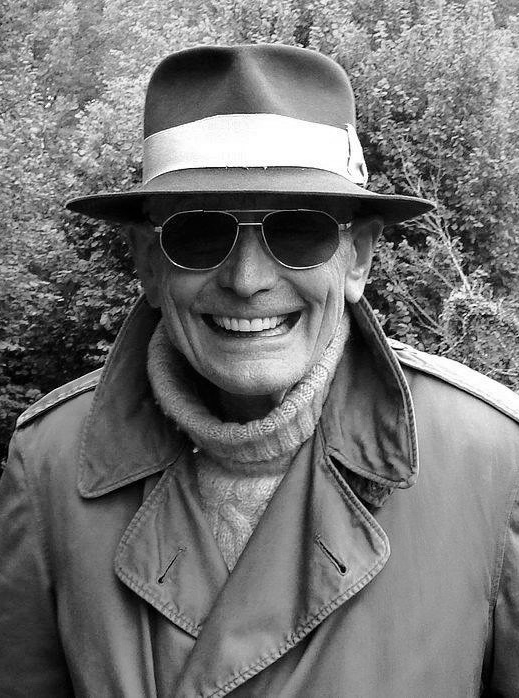
- Born: 25 June 1924; Paris, France
- Died: 17 October 2018 (aged 94); Paris, France
- Education: École nationale supérieure des arts appliqués et des métiers d'art
- Known for: Painter, filmmaker
- Movement: Narrative Figuration
- Spouse: Paule Monory

Jacques Monory (25 June 1924 – 17 October 2018) was a French painter and filmmaker whose work, highly influenced by photography and cinema, is an allegory of the contemporary world with a focus on the violence of everyday reality. His canvases evoke a heavy atmosphere, pulling subject matter from modern civilization through the lens of his signature monochrome color blue.

== Exhibitions ==
Monory's work was exhibited from 12 January to 23 February 2018 at the Richard Taittinger Gallery in New York City. The New York Times featured the show in an article titled "What to See in New York Art Galleries This Week". Martha Schwendener wrote, "Mr. Monory’s canvases can be easily compared to the work of ’80s American postmodern painters like David Salle, Jack Goldstein, Troy Brauntuch and Eric Fischl, but he has a soft spot for older figurative artists, too, like Edward Hopper. “Spéciale n°54 Hommage à Hopper” (2007) features a house with a nearby road sign for the Hopper Center — although no such institution exists, except in this painting, which functions, as does most of Mr. Monory’s work, like a movie screen where fantastical drama and action are routinely played out.".

== Work ==
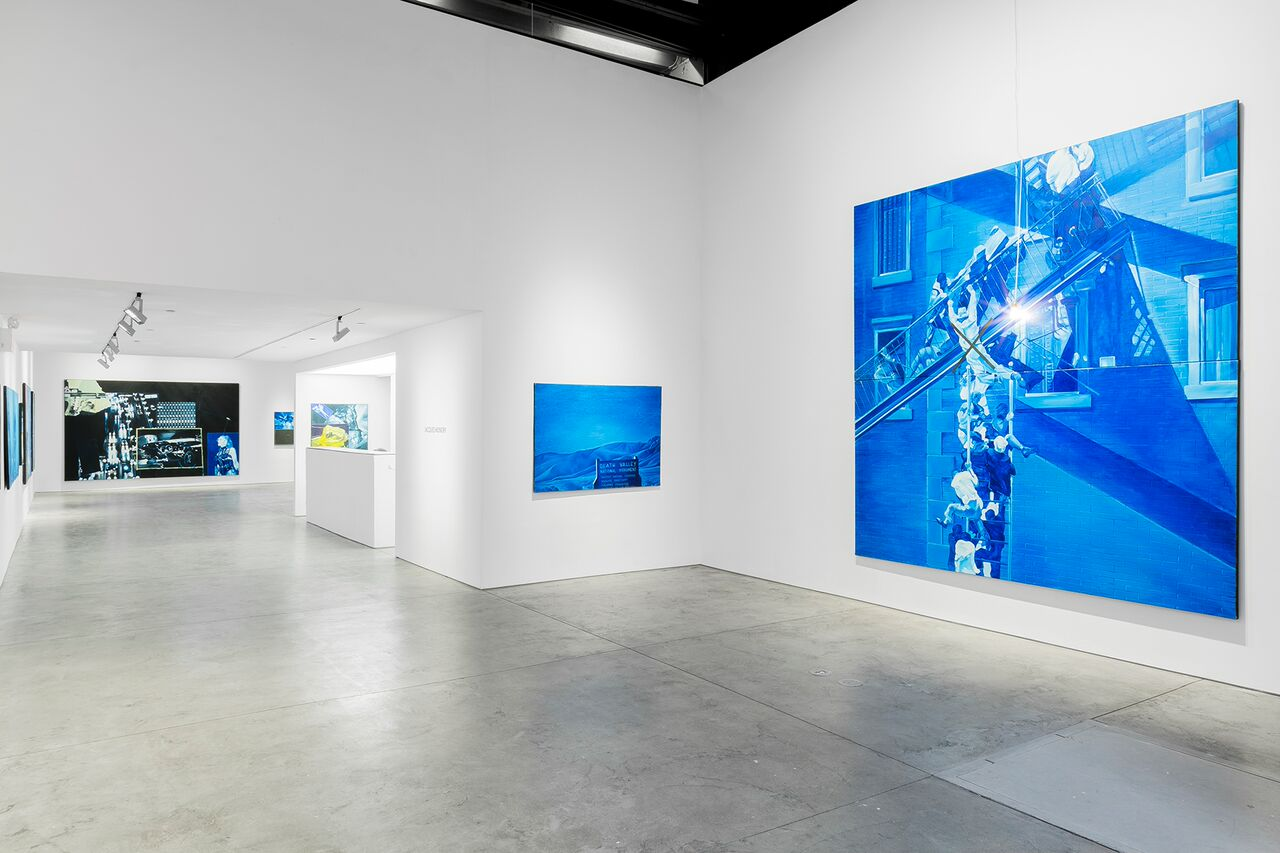
Jacques Monory at Richard Taittinger Gallery, New York City

Monory was first exhibited at the Drouant-David Gallery in Paris in 1952. During the 1960s, he became one of the leading figures of the European movement of Pop Art, called Narrative Figuration by the art critic Gérald Gassiot-Talabot. Monory would say: “What has developed in France has moved away from American Pop Art, we have expressed a critical narrative of society while the Americans have almost always, in my opinion, embraced their system. This is a fundamental difference.”

In 1968, he directed the influential film Ex- and painted the series Les Meurtres (Murders), putting in place the elements that would characterize his work: the division into sequences, the distancing by the use of the blue color, the dream, the illusion, but also a critical look at society.

In 1971, Pierre Gaudibert curated a solo exhibition, Monory Catalogue 1968- 1971 at the Modern Art Museum of Paris which heightened his visibility, making him instantly recognizable. Two trips to the United States in 1969 and 1973 were vitally important to his personal and artistic history; it constitutes, from photos, a repertory of forms, images, and notebooks of models. In 1974, he joined the legendary gallery of Aimé Maeght, where he would exhibit, including his Operas Glacés (Frozen Operas).

In 1986, he exhibited at the 42nd Venice Biennale, and in 1992, he was the featured artist of the French Pavilion at the World Expo in Seville. In 2005, his work inaugurated the MACVAL in France with Detour, a large spiral installation of his paintings. In 2008, Monory was highlighted in the retrospective exhibition Figuration Narrative, at the Grand Palais in Paris. In 2015, a solo retrospective, Jacques Monory, took place at the Helene & Edouard Leclerc Fund for Culture in Landerneau, France.

His work is included in the permanent collections of Pompidou Center, Paris, France; The Museum of Modern Art, Paris, France; Museum of Modern Art and Contemporary Art, Geneva, Switzerland; Museum of Modern Art, Fukoka, Japan; the Maeght Foundation, Saint-Paul de Vence, France; National Museum of Fine Arts, Havana Cuba; the Leeum, Samsung Museum of Art, Seoul, South Korea; the Ludwig Museum, Cologne, Germany; the Museum of Solidarity Salvador Allende, Santiago, Chile; the Stedelijk Museum, Amsterdam, Holland; and the Museum Colecção Berardo, Lisbon, Portugal.
