= Aimé Maeght =

French art dealer, collector, lithographer and publisher

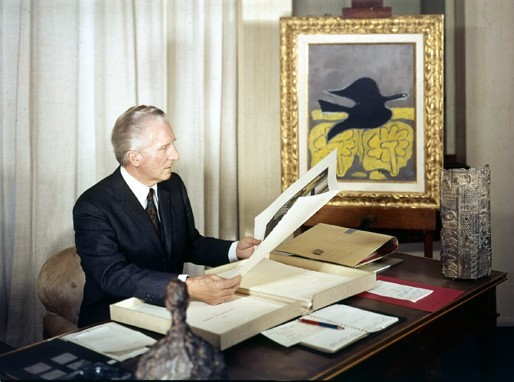
- Born: 27 April 27, 1906; Hazebrouck, France
- Died: 5 September 1981; Saint-Paul-de-Vence, France
- Occupations: Art collector, publisher
- Spouse: Marguerite Maeght

Aimé Maeght (French pronunciation: [ɛme maɡ]; 27 April 1906 – 5 September 1981) was a French art dealer, collector, lithographer, and publisher. He founded the Galerie Maeght in Paris and Barcelona, and the Fondation Maeght in Saint-Paul-de-Vence near Nice (southern France). Though the original Flemish pronunciation is pronounced "[maːxt]", the French pronunciation of surname Maeght sounds more similar to mahg.

== Art dealer ==
As a youth, Maeght studied art and music, training as a lithographer at the Ecole des Beaux-Arts in Nîmes. His first commercial encounter in the art world came in 1930, when Pierre Bonnard came to his Cannes shop and had Maeght print a program for a Maurice Chevalier concert with a Bonnard lithograph. After the programs were produced, Maeght put the lithograph in the print-shop window. A quick sale encouraged the artist to give him a second picture. Maeght made his Paris debut as a major art dealer on the Rue de Teheran in 1945, after World War II. On sale were all the paintings done by Henri Matisse during the war. He also represented Alexander Calder, Georges Braque, Marc Chagall, Alberto Giacometti, Joan Miró, and Fernand Léger. Much of his success as a dealer was attributed to his wife, Marguerite Maeght.

== Publisher and benefactor ==
Aimé Maeght was the founder, editor and publisher of the French art magazine Derrière le Miroir, created in 1946 and published uninterruptedly until 1982. With his wife, Marguerite, he established the Fondation Maeght, a privately funded museum devoted to 20th-century art, in the South of France. The building was designed by the Catalan architect Josep Lluís Sert, houses more than 12,000 pieces of art and attracts "on average, 200,000 visitors ... every year".
