= Raoul Ubac =

French painter

Raoul Ubac (31 August 1910, Cologne – 22 March 1985, Dieudonne, Oise) was a French painter, sculptor, photographer and engraver.

He had various and irregular artistic training and travelled in Europe between 1928 and 1934. He worked mostly on photography between 1934 and 1942, embraced Surrealism in Paris and took photos for the magazine Minotaure. In 1937, he made Tete du Mannequin, a photograph taken of a mannequin (made by André Masson) consisting of everyday objects. Another of his works include the photograph 'La Conciliabule'. He also created a color lithograph Three Seated Nudes, signed lower right margin (edition of 200, 21" x 27 1/2").

Ubac's mother's family ran a tannery and his father was a magistrate. In his early years he traveled through some parts of Europe on foot. He first came to Paris in 1928. He was already enrolled at the Sorbonne for a degree in literary studies when he decided to switch to the Art Academy of Montparnasse. It was there that he moved in the company of the Surrealists.

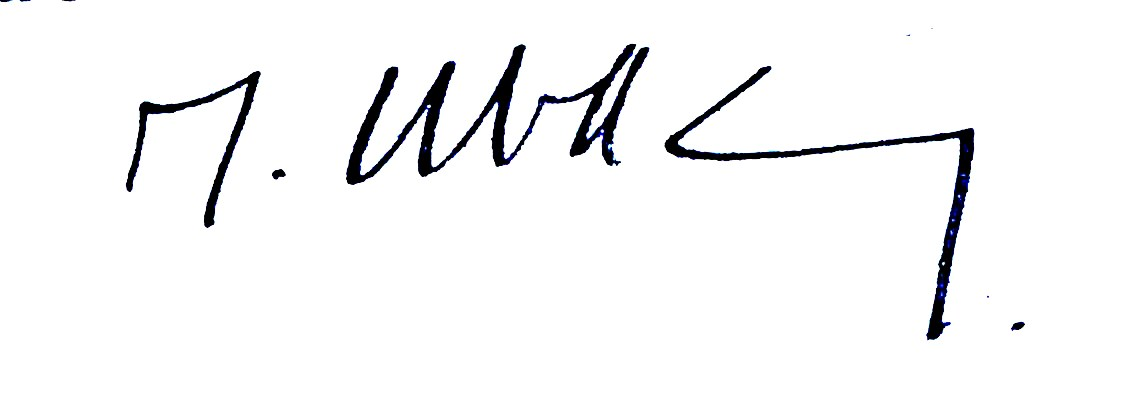
Ubac's signature
