= Le Temps qu'il fait =

French publishing house

Le Temps qu'il fait is a French publishing house, first established in Cognac, and active since 1981.

== History ==
Created and directed by Georges Monti, Le Temps qu'il fait is now located at Bazas, in Gironde. The house draws its name from the eponymous novel by Armand Robin.

Nearly 500 works have been published (2008 figures), mainly in the field of French literature, but also photography. Also regularly published are the "Cahiers du Temps qui fait", critical volumes devoted to a writer, prestigious or kept secret, for example Philippe Jaccottet, Roger Munier, Jude Stéfan, Luc Dietrich, Louis-René des Forêts, Henri Thomas, François Augiéras, Yves Bonnefoy, André Frénaud, etc.

== Some authors ==
- Jean-Pierre Abraham
- Baptiste-Marrey
- Alice Becker-Ho
- Yves Bichet
- Christian Bobin
- François Boddaert
- Yves Bonnefoy
- Jacques Chauviré
- Pascal Commère
- Guy Debord
- Jean-Paul de Dadelsen
- Marc Deneyer
- Luc Dietrich
- André Dhôtel
- Thierry Girard
- Marie Huot
- Philippe Jaccottet
- Gérard Macé
- Jorge Manrique
- Denis Montebello
- Michel Orcel
- Gilles Ortlieb
- Ricardo Paseyro
- Georges Perros
- Jean-Claude Pirotte
- Didier Pobel
- Patrick Renou
- Catherine Rey
- André de Richaud
- Armand Robin
- Paul Louis Rossi
- Paul de Roux
- Valérie Rouzeau
- Lambert Schlechter
- Jude Stéfan
- Richard Texier
- Henri Thomas
- Jean-Loup Trassard
