= Jacques Dupin =

French poet and art critic

Jacques Dupin (4 March 1927, Privas, Ardèche – 27 October 2012, Paris) was a French poet, art critic, and co-founder of the journal L'éphemère.

Dupin was born in the town of Privas in the South of France, where his father was a psychiatrist at a state mental hospital. In 1944, the family moved to Paris, where, in 1950, the poet René Char helped him publish his first collection of poems.

In 1966, he co-founded the poetry quarterly L’Éphémère, with poets including André du Bouchet, Yves Bonnefoy and Paul Celan.

He was the director of publication at Galerie Maeght, which represented Joan Miró, a close friend. The gallery also represented Marc Chagall, Alberto Giacometti, Francis Bacon and Wassily Kandinsky. Giacometti and Bacon both painted his portrait.

Dupin wrote Miró's biography, numerous monographs on the artist's work, and was empowered by Miró's family to be the sole authenticating authority of the artist's work; a role that made him much sought after by collectors. In 1987, Dupin was the curator of a retrospective of Miró's work at the Solomon R. Guggenheim Museum, the first such retrospective in New York since 1959.

== Works ==
=== Poetry in English ===
- Of Flies and Monkeys, translated by John Taylor, The Bitter Oleander Press, September 2011
- Selected Poems, selected by Paul Auster, translated by Stephen Romer and David Shapiro, Bloodaxe Books, 1992
- Selected Poems, Wake Forest University Press, November 1992
- Fits and Starts: Selected Poems of Jacques Dupin, translated by Paul Auster, Living Hand Editions, 1974

=== Poetry in French ===
- Cendrier du voyage, GLM, Paris, 1950
- Art poétique, PAB, Alès, 1956
- Les Brisants, GLM, Paris, 1958
- L'Épervier, GLM, Paris, 1960
- Gravir, Gallimard, Paris, 1963
- L'embrasure, Gallimard, Paris, 1969
- Dehors, Gallimard, Paris, 1975
- Ballast, Le Collet de Buffle, Paris, 1976
- Histoire de la lumière, L'Ire des Vents, Paris, 1978
- De nul lieu et du Japon, Éditions Fata Morgana, Montpellier, 1981
- Le Désœuvrement, Orange export Ltd, 1982
- Une Apparence de soupirail, Gallimard, Paris, 1982
- De singes et de mouches, Éditions Fata Morgana, Montpellier, 1983
- Les Mères, Fata Morgana, Montpellier, 1986
- Contumace, POL, Paris, 1986
- Chansons troglodytes, Éditions Fata Morgana, Montpellier, 1989
- Rien encore, tout déjà, Éditions Fata Morgana, Montpellier, 1991
- Echancré, POL, Paris, 1991
- Eclisse, Spectres familiers, Marseille, 1992
- Le grésil, POL, Paris, 1996
- Ecart, POL, Paris, 2000
- De singes et de mouches suivi de Les mères (réédition), POL, Paris, 2001
- Coudrier, POL, Paris, 2006

=== Essays on modern art ===
- Joan Miro, Flammarion, Paris, 1961 (New augmented edition augmentée 1993)
- Textes pour une approche sur Alberto Giacometti, Maeght éditeur, 1962 (new edition in 1991, éditions Fourbis)
- Matière du souffle (sur Antoni Tàpies), Fourbis, Paris, 1994
- L'espace autrement dit, Editions Galilée, Paris, 1982
- Claude Garache, Dessins, Paris, Conférence et Adam Biro éditeurs, 1999
