= Brahic =

Brahic may refer to:

- 3488 Brahic, main-belt asteroid
- André Brahic (1942–2016), a French astrophysicist
- Beverley Bie Brahic, a Canadian poet and translator
- Brahic, a small village in Les Vans, southern France
