= Roger Munier =

French writer and translator

Roger Munier (21 December 1923, Nancy – 10 August 2010, Vesoul) was a French writer and translator. From 1953, Munier was one of the first to translate into French the work of his master and friend, the German philosopher Martin Heidegger (1889–1976).

== Bibliography ==
Partial list of works and translations, chronologically:

=== Principal works ===
- 1963: Contre l'image, Éditions Gallimard, coll. «Le Chemin»; éd. revue 1989
- 1970: Le Seul (suivi de) D'un seul tenant, [[Claude Tchou]]; rééd. Deyrolle, 1993.
- 1973: L'Instant, Gallimard, coll. «Voix ouvertes» accessdate= 11/10/2016 read online
- 1977: Le Contour, l'éclat, Éditions de la Différence coll. «Différenciation»
- 1979: Le Parcours oblique, La Différence, coll. «Différenciation», n°5
- 1979: Passé sous silence, Parisod, coll. «Strates», n°2
- 1980: Terre sainte, Éditions Arfuyen
- 1982: L'Ordre du jour, Éditions Fata Morgana
- 1982: Le Moins du monde, Gallimard
- 1982: Mélancolie, Le Nyctalope
- 1983: Le Visiteur qui jamais ne vient, Lettres vives, coll. «La Nouvelle gnose», n°3
- 1983: Terre ardente, éd. Deyrolle
- 1985: Au demeurant, La Feugraie, coll. «L'Allure du chemin»
- 1986: Eurydice : élégie, Lettres vives, coll. «Entre 4 yeux»
- 1988: Éden, Arfuyen
- 1989: Le Jardin, éd. La Pionnière
- 1989: Requiem, Arfuyen
- 1991: Le Chant second, Deyrolle
- 1991: L'Apparence et l'apparition, Deyrolle
- 1992: Stèle pour Heidegger, Arfuyen
- 1992: Voir, Deyrolle
- 1992: Psaume furtif, éd. Perpétuelles
- 1992: Tous feux éteints, Lettres vives, coll. «Terre de poésie»
- 1993: Exode, Arfuyen
- 1993: L'Ardente patience d'Arthur Rimbaud, José Corti
- 1993: L'Être et son poème : essai sur la poétique d'André Frénaud, Encre marine
- 1994: Ici, éd. La Pionnière
- 1994: Orphée : cantate, Lettres vives
- 1994: Si j'habite, Fata Morgana, coll. «Hermès»
- 1995: Opus incertum I : carnets 1980–1981, Deyrolle
- 1996: Dieu d'ombre, Arfuyen
- 1996: Éternité, Fata Morgana, coll. «Hermès»
- 1998: La Dimension d'inconnu, José Corti, coll. «En lisant en écrivant»
- 1999: Sauf-conduit, Lettres vives, coll. «Terre de poésie»
- 1999: Contre jour (suivi de) Du fragment, La Feugraie, coll. «L'Allure du chemin»
- 2001: La Chose et le Nom [Opus incertum II, 1982-1983], Fata Morgana
- 2002: Opus incertum [III] 1984-1986, Gallimard
- 2003: L'Extase nue, Gallimard
- 2004: Adam, Arfuyen
- 2004: Nada, Fata Morgana
- 2005: Le Su et l'Insu [Opus incertum IV, 1987-1989], Gallimard
- 2007: Les Eaux profondes (Opus incertum V, 1990-1993), Arfuyen
- 2009: Pour un psaume, Arfuyen
- 2010: L'Aube, Rehauts
- 2010: Esquisse du Paradis perdu, Arfuyen
- 2012: Vision, Arfuyen

=== Translations ===
==== From German ====
- 1957: Martin Heidegger. Lettre sur l'humanisme, éd. Montaigne
- 1970: Angelius Silesius. L'Errant chérubinique [édition abrégée], éd. Planète, series "L'Expérience intérieure"
- 1982: Heinrich von Kleist. Sur le théâtre de marionnettes, éd. Traversière
- 1998: Reiner Maria Rilke. La Huitième élégie de Duino, Fata Morgana, series "Les Immémoriaux"

==== From Spanish ====
- 1965: Octavio Paz, L'Arc et la Lyre, Gallimard, series "Les Essais", n°119
- 1972: Octavio Paz, Courant alternatif, Gallimard, series "Les Essais", n°176
- 1976: Octavio Paz, Point de convergence : du romantisme à l'avant-garde, Gallimard, series "Les Essais", n°193
- 1978: Antonio Porchia. Voix (followed by) Autres voix, Fayard, series "Documents spirituels"
- 1980: Roberto Juarroz. Poésie verticale, Fayard, series "L'Espace intérieur"
- 1984: Roberto Juarroz. Nouvelle poésie verticale, éd. Lettres vives
- 1986: Roberto Juarroz. Quinze poèmes, éd. Unes
- 1986: Antonio Porchia. Voix inédites, éd. Unes
- 1987: Octavio Paz. Sor Juana Inès de la Cruz, Gallimard, series "Bibliothèque des idées"
- 1990: Roberto Juarroz. Poésie verticale : 30 poèmes, éd. Unes
- 1992: Roberto Juarroz. Treizième poésie verticale, José Corti, series "Ibériques"
- 1998: Octavio Paz. Fernando Pessoa : l'inconnu personnel, Fata Morgana

==== From English ====
- 1978: Haïku, préf. by Yves Bonnefoy, Fayard; reprint 2006, Le Seuil, under the title Haïkus

==== From ancient Greek ====
- 1991: Heraclitus. Les Fragments d'Héraclite, Fata Morgana, coll. «Les Immémoriaux»

== About Roger Munier ==
- Roger Munier; François Lallier; Jérôme Thélot [in French] (2010). Cahier Roger Munier. Cognac, France: Les Éditions Le Temps qu'il fait. ISBN 978-2-86853-519-1.
- Chantal Colomb (2004). Roger Munier et la "topologie de l'être" (in French). Paris: éditions L'Harmattan..
