= Guardigli =

Guardigli is an Italian surname. Notable people with the surname include:

- Fabio Guardigli (born 1968), Sammarinese alpine skier
- Francesca Guardigli (born 1973), Sammarinese tennis player
- Luigi Guardigli (1923–2008), Italian painter and mosaicist
