= Gérard Bocholier =

French poet (born 1947)

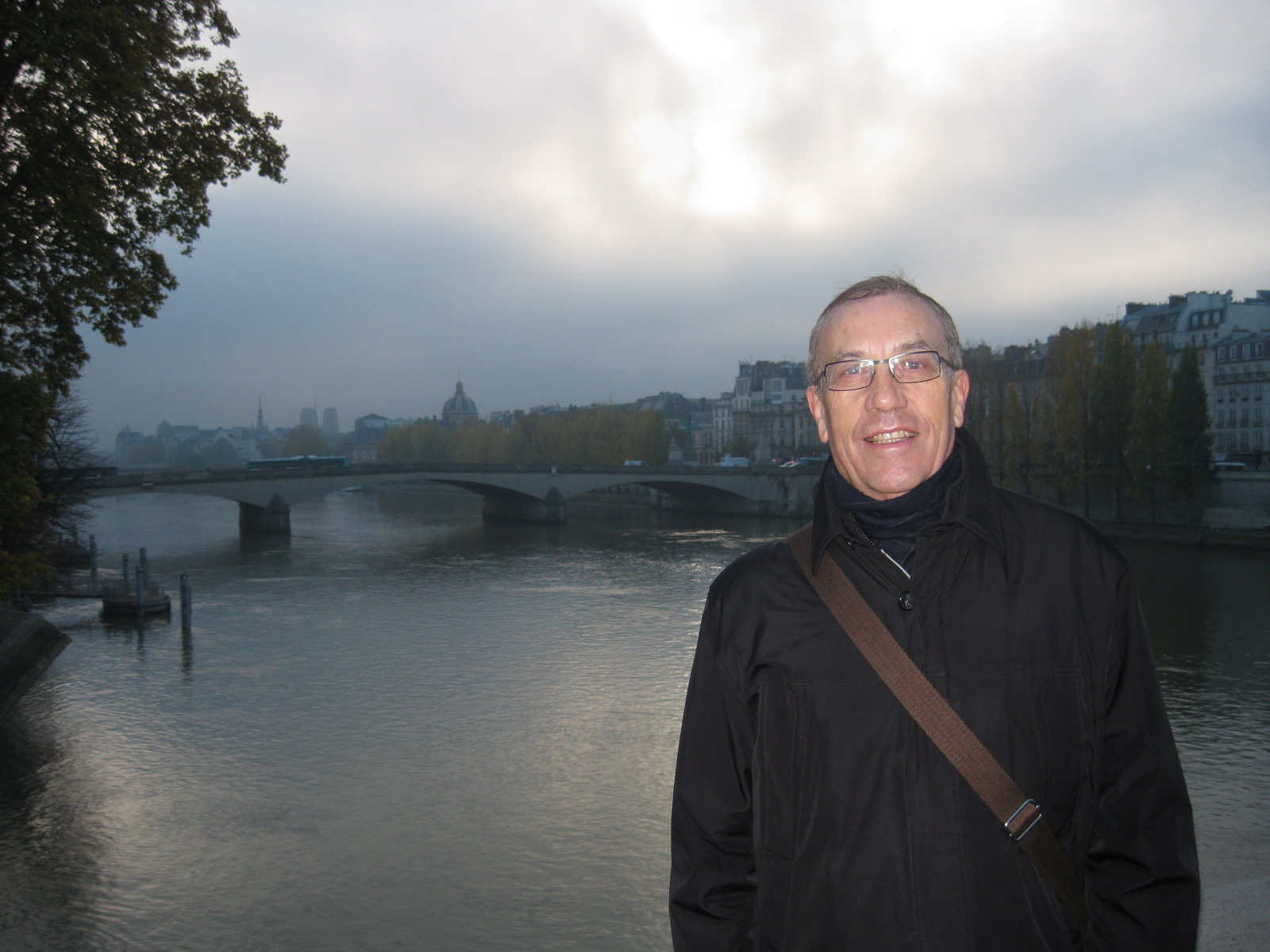
Gérard Bocholier photo

Gérard Bocholier, born in 1947 in Clermont-Ferrand, is a French poet. Having his doctorate in literature, he was professor of classics at the lycée Blaise Pascal of Clermont-Ferrand until 2010. He is director of the poetry review Arpa. He has written a poetry column for the NRF et provided criticism to the Revue de Belles-Lettres published in Geneva. He is responsible for the poetry column of the weekly newspaper La Vie. He has a poetry column on the website "Recours au poème." He also collaborates with the review Études.

== Biography ==
Gérard Bocholier was born in Clermont-Ferrand on 8 September 1947 to an old family of winemakers in the Limagne, who were originally from Monton, and his maternal side hails from the Franche-Comté. He spent his childhood and adolescence at Monton, a place that the prose poems of Le Village emporté evoke alongside its inhabitants. His reading of Pierre Reverdy, to whom he has devoted two essays, was important in his decision to devote his life to poetry. In 1971, he received from Marcel Arland, director of the NRF, the prix Paul Valéry, which is reserved for student poets.

Receiving his doctorate in literature the same year, he first taught for four years at Aurillac before being named professor and pedagogical counselor at the lycée Blaise Pascal in Clermont-Ferrand. In 1976, in Clermont-Ferrand, he took part in the foundation of the poetry review Arpa, where he has served as director since 1984. Professional connections have helped him in his career: Jean Grosjean and Jacques Réda welcomed him to the NRF, where he became a regular contributor in poetry from the 1990s on; another close friend is his fellow poet Anne Perrier of Romandy, who received the Grand Prix National de Poèsie en France, and whose complete works he prefaced in 2008. He has also edited a collection of Andre Gide's aphorisms, and collaborated in 2008 in a colloquium devoted to Roger Munier at the University of Lyon. His work is permeated by themes of humility, destitution, self-effacement, and nature.

=== Poems and essays ===
- L'Ordre du Silence, Chambelland, 1975
- Le vent et l'homme, Éditions Rougerie, 1976
- L'arbre et la nuit, Éditions Rougerie, 1979
- Chemin de guet, Subervie, 1979
- Liens, Éditions Rougerie, 1981
- Lèvres, Rougerie, 1983
- Poésie en Auvergne, anthologie, Rougerie, 1983
- Pierre Reverdy, le phare obscur, Champ Vallon, 1984
- Terre de ciel, vignettes de Martine Mellinette, Cheyne éditeur, 1985
- Poussière ardente, Éditions Rougerie, 1987
- Si petite planète, vignettes de Martine Mellinette, Cheyne éditeur, 1989
- Secret des lieux, Éditions Rougerie, 1990
- Poèmes du petit bonheur, Hachette (Livre de poche), 1992
- Un chardon de bleu pur, Table Rase, 1992
- Terre prochaine, Éditions Rougerie, 1992
- Baudelaire en toutes lettres, Éditions Bordas, 1993
- Cinq poèmes-livres, éditions illustrées numérotées, aux éditions Grandir (1993)
- Voix secrète, L'Arrière-Pays, 1995
- Chants de Lazare, L'Arrière-Pays, 1998
- Le village et les ombres, L'Arbre, 1998
- Lueurs de fin, Éditions Rougerie, 2000
- La Veille, L'Estocade, 2000
- Les ombrages fabuleux, L'Escampette, 2003
- Du feu jeté, L'Arrière-Pays, 2004
- Le Démuni, Tarabuste, 2005
- La Venue, Éditions Arfuyen, 2006
- Jour au-delà, Éditions Rougerie, 2006
- Abîmes cachés, L'Arrière-Pays, 2010
- Psaumes du bel amour, Ad Solem, 2010, préface de Jean-Pierre Lemaire
- Belles saisons obscures, Arfuyen, 2012
- Psaumes de l'espérance, Ad Solem, 2012, envoi de Philippe Jaccottet
- Le Village emporté, L'Arrière-Pays, 2013
- Passant, La Porte, 2014
- Le poème exercice spirituel, Ad Solem, 2014
- Figures et miracles, bois gravés de Clément Leca, La Fenêtre ouverte, 2015
- Chant de patience, gravures de Philippe Chassang, Les Cahiers des passerelles, 2016
- Les Etreintes invisibles, L'herbe qui tremble, 2016
- Nuits, Ad Solem, 2016
- Les chemins tournants de Pierre Reverdy, Editions Tituli, 2016
- Les nuages de l'âme. Journal 1996–2016, Editions Pétra, 2016
- Frissons du jour, dessins et gravure d'Evelyn Dufour, L'atelier du Lierre, 2017
- Tisons , La Coopérative, 2018
- Un Chardon de bleu pur, L'herbe qui tremble, 2018
- Depuis toujours le chant, Arfuyen, 2019
- Psaumes de la Foi vive, Ad Solem, 2019
- Ainsi parlait Georges Bernanos, Arfuyen, 2019
- Frissons du jour, traduit en mandarin, édition bilingue, Editions You-Feng, 2019
- J'appelle depuis l'enfance, La Coopérative, 2020
- Une brûlante usure. Journal 2016–2017, Le Silence qui roule, 2020
- Ainsi parlait André Gide, Arfuyen, 2022
- Vers le Visage, Le Silence qui roule, 2023
- Cette allée qui s'efface, Arfuyen, 2024
- L'accueil du jour, Ad Solem, 2025
- Semences de l'aube, Illador, 2025
- Ciels retrouvés. Journal de saisons, Le Silence qui roule, 2026

=== Prefaces ===
- Anne Perrier, Œuvre poétique 1952–1994 (L'Escampette, 1996).
- Béatrice Douvre, Poèmes (L'Arrière-Pays, 1998).
- Jean-Pierre Boulic, L'Instant si fragile (Le Nouvel Athanor, 2005).
- Monique Saint-Julia, Claire-Voie (Éditions n & b, 2008).
- Olivier Verdun, Au gré des regs contondants (Editions de l'Atlantique, 2009).
- Janine Modlinger, Une lumière à peine (Éditions de l'Atlantique, 2012).
- Jean-Pierre Farines, Le portail gris bleu (Éditions de l'Atlantique, 2012).
- Janine Modlinger, Eblouissements (Ad Solem, 2014).
- Anne Goyen, Paroles données (Ad Solem, 2016).
- Christophe Mahy, Paysages du vent (Noires Terres, 2017).
- Jacques Robinet, La nuit réconciliée (La Tête à l'envers, 2018).
- Nicolas Waquet, Dans l'ombre inscrit (Édition Unicité, 2021).
- Claude Tuduri, Mille ans comme un jour (Tituli, 2022)
- Camille Ganne, L'étreinte du jour (Le Petit Pavé, 2022)
- François Graveline, Au beau milieu de soi (Atelier du grand Tétras, 2024)

=== Collective works ===
- Lire Reverdy , Presses Universitaires de Lyon, 1990
- Reverdy aujourd'hui, Presses de l'École Normale Supérieure, 1991
- Pour saluer Robert Marteau, Champ Vallon, 1996
- Pierre-Albert Jourdan, Cahier Dix, Le Temps qu'il fait, 1996
- Le Pays Cadou, Le Vert Sacré, 2003
- Pierre-Alain Tâche. Une poétique de l'instant, Bibliothèque cantonale et universitaire de Lausanne, 2006
- Roger Munier, Cahier Dix-sept, Le Temps qu'il fait, 2010
- L'inquiétude de l'esprit ou pourquoi la poésie en temps de crise?, Editions Cécile Defaut, 2014
- Philippe Jaccottet Juste le poète, Revue Lettres No. 1, Editions Aden, 2014
- Jean-Claude Pirotte, Classiques Garnier, 2015
- Les Cahiers de Recours au poème / Roger Munier, livre numérique, Editions Recours au poème, 2015
- Pierre-Albert Jourdan Ici, dans le débordement d'espace, Revue Lettres No. 2, Editions Aden, 2016
- Poésie naissante, une anthologie contemporaine inédite, Le Bateau fantôme, 2017
- François Cheng, Les Cahiers de l'Herne, 2022
- Dans les sentiers de la Quête de joie (Patrice de La Tour du Pin), L'Herbe rouge, 2023
- Du milieu de nos jours. Poésie moderne et transcendance, Editions du Cerf, 2025

== Prizes ==
- Prix Paul Valéry (1971)
- Prix Ilarie Voronca for Chemin de guet (1978)
- Prix Albert Hennequin de la Société des Gens de lettres (1979) for Chemin de guet
- Prix Louis-Guillaume for Poussière ardente (1987)
- Grand prix de poésie pour la jeunesse for Poèmes du petit bonheur (1991)
- Prix Jacques Normand de la Société des Gens de lettres (1991) for Terre prochaine
- Prix Paul Verlaine 1994 (Maison de Poésie) for his total contribution to poetry
- Prix Louise Labé 2011 for Abîmes cachés
- Prix François Coppée 2013 de l'Académie Française for Psaumes de l'espérance
