= Miklos Bokor =

French-Hungarian painter and essayist (1927–2019)

Miklos Bokor (2 March 1927 – 18 March 2019) was a French-Hungarian painter and essayist who was born in Budapest on 2 March 1927 and died in Paris on 18 March 2019.

== Biography ==
Miklos Bokor was deported to the Auschwitz extermination camp with his entire family in 1944. After his mother died, he was then transferred to Buchenwald, Rhemsdorf, Tröglitz and Kleinau with his father, who disappeared at Bergen-Belsen. After being liberated in 1945, he was repatriated to Budapest by the International Red Cross and Red Crescent Movement.

After a first private exhibition in Budapest in 1953, Miklos Bokor stayed in Paris and settled permanently in France in 1960. At the Janine Hoa Gallery, which presented his paintings in 1962, he became friends with the poets Yves Bonnefoy and André du Bouchet, who later regularly prefaced his exhibitions. He had an atelier at La Ruche, the celebrated artist's residence in Paris, for more than 40 years.

Boklor's art drew upon his experiences in the Holocaust and his oeuvre reflects the horror of extermination. He once described this impact on his work as:

Something happened in Auschwitz that lurks in society like a gap, a wound that does not heal. Returning from the dead, the one who has lived in his flesh and in his spirit the experience of dehumanization begins to paint the unspeakable.

Much of Boklor's work is held in the collections of the Musée d'Art Moderne de Paris.

== Selected exhibitions ==
- 2003 Miklos Bokor – Musée des Beaux-Arts de Caen, Caen, France
- 2005 Miklos Boko – Galerie Ditesheim, Neuchâtel Switzerland
- 2011Miklos Bokor, L'homme qui montait de l'abîme – Galerie Guillaume, Paris, France
- 2013 Miklos Bokor. Paysage et présence de l'homme, Galerie Ditesheim und Maffeil, Neuchâtel, Switzerland
- 2014 Miklos Bokor, Musée d'Art Moderne de Paris, Paris, France
- 2018 Miklos Bokor, Incertaine certitude – Galerie Guillaume, Paris

== Selected bibliography ==
- “Peut-on finir avec Hitler?” (2010) ISBN 9782296112469
