= L'Éphémère =

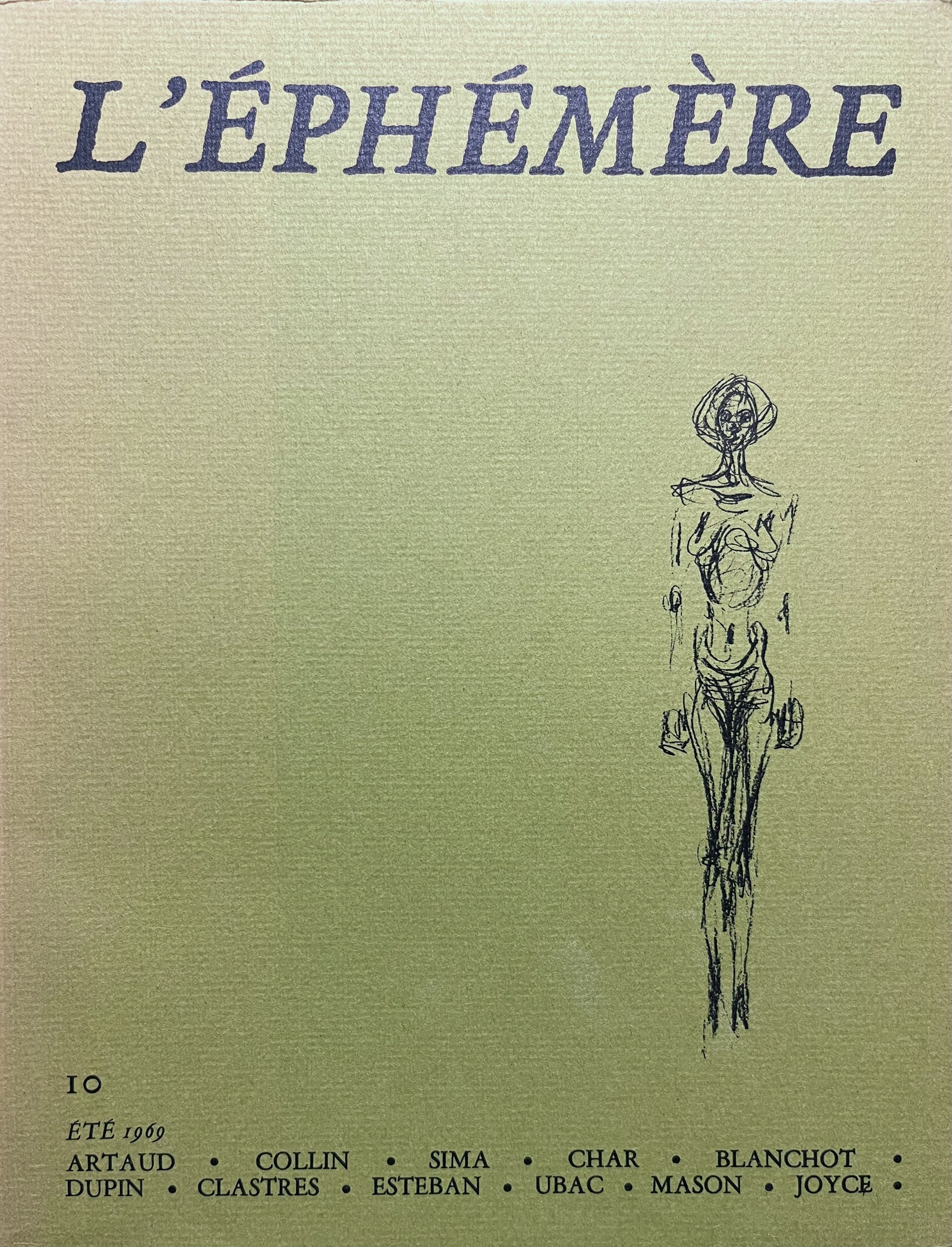

L'Éphémère was a French poetry magazine published from 1967 to 1972 in Paris, France. The magazine was founded and edited by poets Yves Bonnefoy, Louis-René Des Forêts, Jacques Dupin and André Du Bouchet. It was established to react to new literary waves in the country, which ignored the privileged status of poetry. The financier of the magazine, which was published quarterly, was Galerie Maeght.
