= Marthe Robert =

French essayist and translator

Marthe Robert (March 25, 1914 – April 12, 1996) was a French essayist and translator.

Robert was born in Paris on March 25, 1914. In 1941, she met psychoanalyst Michel de M'Uzan, whom she later married. In 1995, she received the Grand Prix National des Lettres.

Her work is influenced by Sigmund Freud and psychoanalysis.

== Works ==
=== Essays ===
- Introduction à la lecture de Kafka, Éditions du Sagittaire, coll. L'heure nouvelle, 1946
- Un homme inexprimable. Essai sur l'œuvre de Heinrich von Kleist, 1955
- Heinrich von Kleist, Paris, L'Arche, Les Grands dramaturges, 1955
- Kafka, 1960
- L'Ancien et le nouveau, 1963
- La Révolution psychanalytique, 1964, 2 vol.
- Sur le papier : essais, éditions Grasset, 1967
- Seul comme Franz Kafka, 1969
- Roman des origines et origines du roman, 1972
- D'Œdipe à Moïse : Freud et la conscience juive, 1974
- Livre de lectures I, 1977
- Artaud vivant, et al. 1980
- La Vérité littéraire : livre de lectures II, 1981
- En haine du roman : étude sur Flaubert, 1982
- La Tyrannie de l'imprimé : livre de lectures III, 1984
- Le Puits de Babel : livre de lectures IV, 1987
- La Traversée littéraire, 1994

=== Translations ===
- Contes de Grimm, Gallimard, 1976
- Kafka (textes choisis), Gallimard, coll. Bibliothèque idéale, 1960
- Ainsi parlait Zarathoustra de Friedrich Nietzsche coll. Club français du livre, 1958
