= André du Bouchet =

French poet (1924–2001)

- Born: 7 April 1924; Paris
- Died: 19 April 2001 (aged 77); Truinas
- Spouse(s): Tina Jolas, Anne de Staël
- Children: Paule du Bouchet, Marie du Bouchet
- Writing career
- Genre: Poetry

André du Bouchet (April 7, 1924 – April 19, 2001) was a French poet.

== Biography ==
Born in Paris, André du Bouchet lived in France until 1941 when his family left occupied Europe for the United States. He studied comparative literature first at Amherst College and then at Harvard University. After teaching for a year, he returned to France. Here Du Bouchet became friends with the poets Pierre Reverdy, René Char, and Francis Ponge, and with the painters Pierre Tal-Coat and Alberto Giacometti.

Du Bouchet was one of the precursors of what would come to be called "poésie blanche" or "white poetry." In 1956, he published a collection of poems entitled Le Moteur blanc or "The White Motor". In 1966, he, along with (among others) Yves Bonnefoy, Jacques Dupin, Louis-René des Forêts and Gaëtan Picon, founded the poetry revue L'Ephémère. Twenty issues were published from 1966 to 1973.

In 1961, Du Bouchet's first major poetry collection, Dans la chaleur vacante, was published to critical acclaim and he won the Prix de la critique (the Critic's Prize) for that year.

He also wrote art criticism, most notably about the works of Nicolas Poussin, Hercules Seghers, Tal-Coat, Bram van Velde and Giacometti, and translated works by Paul Celan, Hölderlin, Osip Mandelstam, Boris Pasternak, Laura Riding, William Faulkner, Shakespeare and James Joyce.

In 1983 he won the National Poetry Prize or "Prix national de la poésie".

André du Bouchet died in 2001 at the age of 76, in Truinas, Drôme department of France.

== Poetry ==
André du Bouchet's poetry—greatly and conflictually influenced by the poetic and interpretive preoccupations of Stéphane Mallarmé, the "banality" of Pierre Reverdy's images, Arthur Rimbaud's "abrasive/coarse reality", the work of Henri Michaux, as well as the philosophical work of Heidegger—is characterized by a valuation of the page layout (with words erupting from the white of the page), by the use of free verse and, often, by difficult grammar and elusive meaning (he writes in "Notes on Translation" that sense "is not fixed"). As a result of these influences, his work evokes a sense of an existential, if not elemental, Heraclitian present. The natural elements of earth and air reappear constantly in his poems. The world, as he has written, will not end up in a book, as Mallarmé had claimed, since for du Bouchet the world has no end.

Du Bouchet's poetry confronts (that is to say, it touches with its front or forehead) external reality (mountains, wind, stones...) and the words describe, and are at the same time a part of, that reality. (How, then, could sense ever be fixed?, he asked.) This confrontation provokes a sense of otherness (not in a purely Heideggerian manner, as Du Bouchet's being is revealed as an object of flesh in its nudity and poverty) and a realization of the presence of objects and elements in the world and of the self as such an object, a "thing among things", as he frequently writes, echoing the phenomenologist Maurice Merleau-Ponty.

== List of works ==
- Mercure de France :
  - Dans la chaleur vacante, 1961 (reissued in 1991 by Poésie/Gallimard), awarded the Critic's Prize (fr: Prix de la Critique).
  - La Tempête de William Shakespeare (translation), 1963.
  - Où le soleil, 1968.
  - Qui n'est pas tourné vers nous, 1972.
  - Voyage en Arménie de Ossip Mandelstam (translation), first edition in 1983, reissued in 2004.
  - Poèmes de Paul Celan (translation), 1986.
  - Ici en deux, 1986 (reissued in 2011 by Poésie/Gallimard).
  - Désaccordée comme par de la neige, Tübingen, 22 May 1986, 1989.
  - Axiales, 1992.
  - Poèmes et proses, 1995.
  - Entretien dans la montagne by Paul Celan (translated in collaboration with John E. Jackson), 1996.
  - L’Emportement du muet, 2000.
- Fata Morgana :
  - Air 1950-1953 followed by Défets, 1986.
  - Laisses, 1984 (reissue).
  - L'Incohérence, 1984 (reissue).
  - Rapides, 1984 (reissue).
  - Peinture, 1983.
  - Le Voyage en Arménie, by Ossip Mandelstam (translation), 1983 (reissued in 2004).
  - Aujourd'hui c'est, 1984 (reissued in 1994).
  - Une tache, 1988.
  - Carnet, 1994.
  - Le Méridien, by Paul Celan (translation), 1995.
  - Pourquoi si calmes, 1996.
  - Carnet 2, 1998.
  - D'un trait qui figure et défigure, with a foreword by Alberto Giacometti, 1997.
  - Annotations sur l'espace non datées. Carnet 3, 2000.
  - Tumulte, 2001.
  - Lire Finnegans Wake (with an afterword by André Gide), 2003.
- Éditions Gallimard:
  - Le Gambit du cavalier, by William Faulkner (translation), 1952.
  - "Dans la chaleur vacante" suivi de "Où le soleil", collection published by "Poésie"/Gallimard, 1991.
  - L'Ajour, collection published by "Poésie"/Gallimard, 1998.
  - Ici en deux, preface by M. Collot, collection published by "Poésie"/Gallimard, 2011.
- Other editors :
  - Air, Jean Aubier, 1951.
  - Sans couvercle, Guy Lévis Mano, 1953.
  - Au deuxième étage, Le Dragon publishing company, 1956.
  - Le Moteur blanc, Guy Lévis Mano, 1956.
  - Sol de la montagne, with etchings by Dora Maar, Jean Hugues, 1956.
  - Cette surface, with an illustration by Tal-Coat, Pierre-André Benoit publishing company, 1956.
  - Dans la chaleur vacante, with an illustration by Jean Hélion, Pierre-André Benoit publishing company, 1959. Reissued by Mercure de France (1961 et 1978). Reissue followed by Où le soleil, Gallimard, Poésie-Gallimard collection, 1991.
  - Sur le pas, with illustrations by Tal-Coat, Maeght Éditeur, 1959.
  - La Lumière de la lame, with etchings by Joan Miró, Maeght Éditeur, 1962.
  - L'Avril, Janine Hao (1963). Reissue preceded by 'Fraîchir, Thierry Bouchard, 1983.
  - L'Inhabité, with an illustration by Claude Georges, Le Point Cardinal, 1964. Reissued by Jean Hugues, with an illustration by Alberto Giacometti, 1965.
  - La Couleur, Le Collet de buffle, 1975.
  - Laisses, Françoise Simecek, 1975. Reissue by Hachette, P.O.L., 1979, and by Fata Morgana, 1984.
  - Air 1950-1953, Clivages, 1977.
  - Le Révolu, Orange Export Ltd, 1977.
  - Un jour de plus augmenté d'un jour, Le Collet de buffle, 1977.
  - Là, aux lèvres, Clivages, 1978.
  - Poèmes, L'Ire des Vents, 1978.
  - Sous le linteau en forme de joug, with an illustration by Tal-Coat, Clivages/Françoise Simecek, 1978.
  - L'Incohérence, Hachette, P.O.L., 1979.
  - Dans leurs voix, leurs eaux, with illustrations by Bram Van Velde, Maeght Éditeur, 1980.
  - Rapides, Hachette, P.O.L., 1980. Reissued by Fata Morgana, 1984.
  - Défets, Clivages, 1981.
  - Fraîchir, Clivages, 1981.
  - Les Hauts-de-Buhl, L'Ire des Vents, 1981. Reissued by Fourbis, 1989.
  - Ici en deux, avec des illustrations de Geneviève Asse, Quentin Éditeur, 1982. Reissued by Mercure de France, 1986.
  - Carnets 1952-1956, édition de M. Collot, Paris, Plon, 1989.
  - Cendre tirant sur le bleu et Envol, Clivages, 1986. Reissued in 1991.
  - Carnets 1952-1956, Librairie Plon, 1989. Reissued by Fata Morgana, 1994 and 1998.
  - De plusieurs déchirements dans les parages de la peinture, Éditions Unes, 1990.
  - Alberto Giacometti — dessin, Maeght Éditeur.
  - Le Second Silence de Pasternak, with preface by V. Martinez, Éditions La Rivière Échappée, Rennes, 2009.
  - Henri VIII, by William Shakespeare (translation), afterword by J.-B. de Seynes, Paris, Le Bruit du Temps, 2011.
  - Aveuglante ou banale. Essais et articles 1949-1959, editing and preface by C. Layet, Paris, Le Bruit du Temps, 2011.
  - Une lampe dans la lumière aride. Carnets 1949-1959, editing and preface by C. Layet, Paris, Le Bruit du Temps, 2011
  - Un mot : ce n'est pas le sens, bilingual editing by M. Bishop and V. Martinez, English translation by M. Bishop, Halifax (Canada), VVV, 2013.
  - Sur un rouge de Nicolas de Staël, editing by J.-P. Léger, Paris, Clivages, 2013.
  - Essais sur l'art, editing by T. Augais, to be issued in 2014.
- Translations into English :
  - Where Heat Looms, a translation of Dans la chaleur vacante by David Mus, Los Angeles, Sun & Moon, 1996.
  - Un mot : ce n'est pas le sens, bilingual editing by M. Bishop and V. Martinez, English translation by M. Bishop, Halifax (Canada), VVV, 2013.
  - Openwork: Poetry and Prose, selected, translated, and presented by Paul Auster and Hoyt Rogers, New Haven and London, Yale University Press, 2014.
  - Outside: Poetry and Prose, selected, translated, and presented by Eric Fishman and Hoyt Rogers, Fayetteville, Bitter Oleander Press, 2020.
- Turkish Translations
  - Bugün Budur, a translation of *Aujourd’hui c’est aujourd’hui* by Ahmet Soysal, Ayrıntı Yayınları, 2002.
  - Beyaz Motor ve Diğerleri, a translation of *Beyaz Motor ve Diğer Şiirler* by Ahmet Soysal, Oğlak Yayınları, 2000 (approx.).

== Interviews ==
  - "Avec du Bouchet", interview with Georges Piroué (1961), L'étrangère No.14-15, La Lettre Volée, June 2007.
  - "André du Bouchet à la croisée des langages", Le monde des livres, 10 June 1983 (L'étrangère No.14-15).
  - "Déplacement de glaciers. Récit d'entretiens avec André du Bouchet" by Daniel Guillaume, Poétiques et Poésies contemporaines. Etudes, Le Temps qu'il fait, 2003.
  - "Entretien avec André du Bouchet" by D. Grandmont, L'Humanité, 10 November 1995 (L'étrangère No.14-15).
  - Promenades ethnologiques en France, three broadcasts in several parts, for which A. du Bouchet is producer and actor, France Culture, August 1981.
  - Surpris par la nuit, interview with A. Veinstein, France Culture, 24 January 1995.
  - Surpris par la nuit, à propos de Andains et de Poèmes et proses, France Culture, 14 August 1999
  - Surpris par la nuit, "Espaces de la poésie", broadcast by Jean-Pascal Léger, France Culture, 23–24 December 2002.
