= Louis-René des Forêts =

French writer

Louis-René des Forêts (28 January 1916 – 30 December 2000) was a French writer.

== Life ==
Des Forêts's only novel, The Beggars (Les Mendiants) was published by Éditions Gallimard in 1943. The rest of his works include shorter narratives, such as his best known work, Le Bavard, and poetry. His work has been commented on by authors such as Maurice Blanchot or Yves Bonnefoy.

In 1954, des Forêts co-founded a committee against the Algerian war, with Dionys Mascolo, Edgar Morin and Robert Antelme. In 1967, he co-founded the literary journal L'Éphémère with writers Yves Bonnefoy, André du Bouchet, Paul Celan, Jacques Dupin, Michel Leiris and others.

Des Forêts received several literary prizes in France and Belgium. He was awarded the Grand prix national des Lettres for the entirety of his work in 1990.

Des Forêts was also a painter.

== Bibliography ==
- Les Mendiants (Gallimard, 1943). The Beggars, trans. Helen Beauclerk (D. Dobson, 1948)
- Le Bavard (Gallimard, 1946). The Bavard, trans. Jean Stewart in The Children's Room (1963)
- La Chambre des enfants: récits (Gallimard, 1960). Includes: "Un malade en forêt"; "Les grands moments d'un chanteur"; "La chambre des enfants"; "Une mémoire démentielle"; "Dans un miroir". The 1983 edition does not include "Un malade en forêt", which was published separately in 1985.
- Les Mégères de la mer (Mercure de France, 1967)
- Voies et détours de la fiction (Fata Morgana, 1985)
- Un malade en forêt (Fata Morgana, 1985). Included in first edition of La Chambre des enfants (1960).
- Le Malheur au Lido (Fata Morgana, 1987)
- Poèmes de Samuel Wood (Fata Morgana, 1988). Partially translated by Ann Smock (1991); later Poems of Samuel Wood, trans. Anthony Barnett (Allardyce Book, 2011)
- Face à l'immémorable (Fata Morgana, 1993)
- Ostinato (Mercure de France, 1997). Ostinato, trans. Mary Ann Caws (University of Nebraska Press, 2002)
- Pas à pas jusqu'au dernier (Mercure de France, 2001)

=== Compilations in English ===
- The Children’s Room, trans. Jean Stewart (Calder, 1963). Includes: The Bavard; "The Children's Room" ("La chambre des enfants"); "The Great Moments of a Singer" ("Les grands moments d'un chanteur"); and "Disordered Silence" ("Une mémoire démentielle").

== Awards and honours ==
- 1960: Prix des Critiques for La Chambre des enfants
- 1988: Prix Maeterlinck for his body of work
- 1990: Grand prix national des Lettres for his body of work
- 1997: Grand prix de littérature de la SGDL for Ostinato
- 1997: Prix de l'Écrit intime for Ostinato
