= Grand prix national des Lettres =

The grand prix national des Lettres (French pronunciation: [ɡʁɑ̃ pʁi nɑsjɔnal de lɛtʁ]) was created in 1950 by the French Ministry of Culture to recognize writers who have contributed to the influence of French literature. It has not been awarded since 1999.

== List of laureates ==
- 1951: Émile Chartier, known as Alain
- 1952: Valery Larbaud
- 1953: Henri Bosco
- 1954: André Billy
- 1955: Jean Schlumberger
- 1956: Alexandre Arnoux
- 1957: Louis Martin-Chauffier
- 1958: Gabriel Marcel
- 1959: Saint-John Perse
- 1960: Marcel Arland
- 1961: Gaston Bachelard
- 1962: Pierre-Jean Jouve
- 1963: Jacques Maritain
- 1964: Jacques Audiberti
- 1965: Henri Michaux (refused)
- 1966: Julien Green
- 1967: Louis Guilloux
- 1968: Jean Grenier
- 1969: Jules Roy
- 1970: Maurice Genevoix
- 1971: Jean Cassou
- 1972: Henri Petit
- 1973: Jacques Madaule
- 1974: Marguerite Yourcenar
- 1975: André Dhôtel
- 1976: Armand Lunel
- 1977: Philippe Soupault
- 1978: Roger Caillois
- 1979: Marcel Brion
- 1980: Michel Leiris (refused)
- 1981: Pierre Klossowski
- 1982: Nathalie Sarraute
- 1983: Jean Genet
- 1984: Jean Cayrol
- 1985: André Pieyre de Mandiargues
- 1986: Kateb Yacine
- 1987: Robert Pinget
- 1988: Maurice Nadeau
- 1989: Jean-Toussaint Desanti
- 1990: Louis-René des Forêts
- 1991: Béatrix Beck
- 1992: Louis Calaferte
- 1993: Jean Tardieu
- 1994: Dominique Rolin
- 1995: Marthe Robert
- 1996: Patrick Modiano
- 1997: not awarded
- 1998: Michel Houellebecq and Jean Starobinski
- 1999: Réjean Ducharme and François Cochet
