= La Ruche (residence) =

Artists residence

Coordinates: 48°49′57″N 2°17′49″E

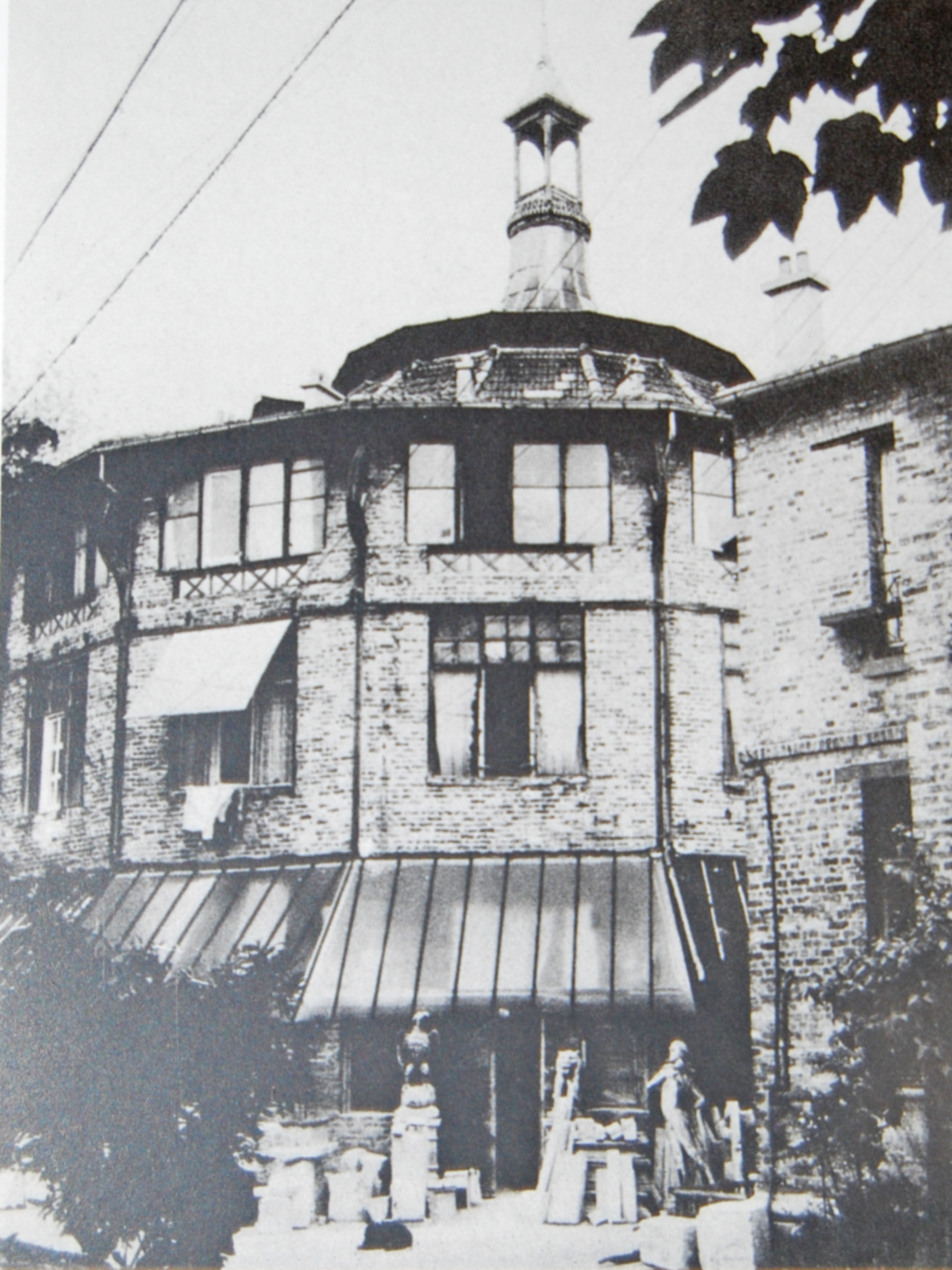
La Ruche, c.1918

La Ruche ([la ʁyʃ]; "the beehive") was an artist's residence in the Montparnasse district of Paris. It now hosts around fifty artists and stages art exhibitions open to the public.

== History ==
Located in the Passage Dantzig, in the 15th arrondissement of Paris, La Ruche is a three-storey circular structure that got its name because it looked more like a large beehive than a dwelling for humans. Originally a temporary building designed by Gustave Eiffel for use as a wine rotunda at the Great Exposition of 1900, the structure was dismantled and re-erected as low-cost studios for artists by Alfred Boucher (1850–1934), a sculptor, who wanted to help young artists by providing them with shared models and an exhibition space open to all residents. As well as to artists, La Ruche became a home to transients.

At La Ruche the rent was cheap; and no one was evicted for non-payment. When hungry, many would wander over to artist Marie Vassilieff's soup kitchen (more genteelly called her cantine) for a meal and conversation with fellow starving artists.

== Artists ==
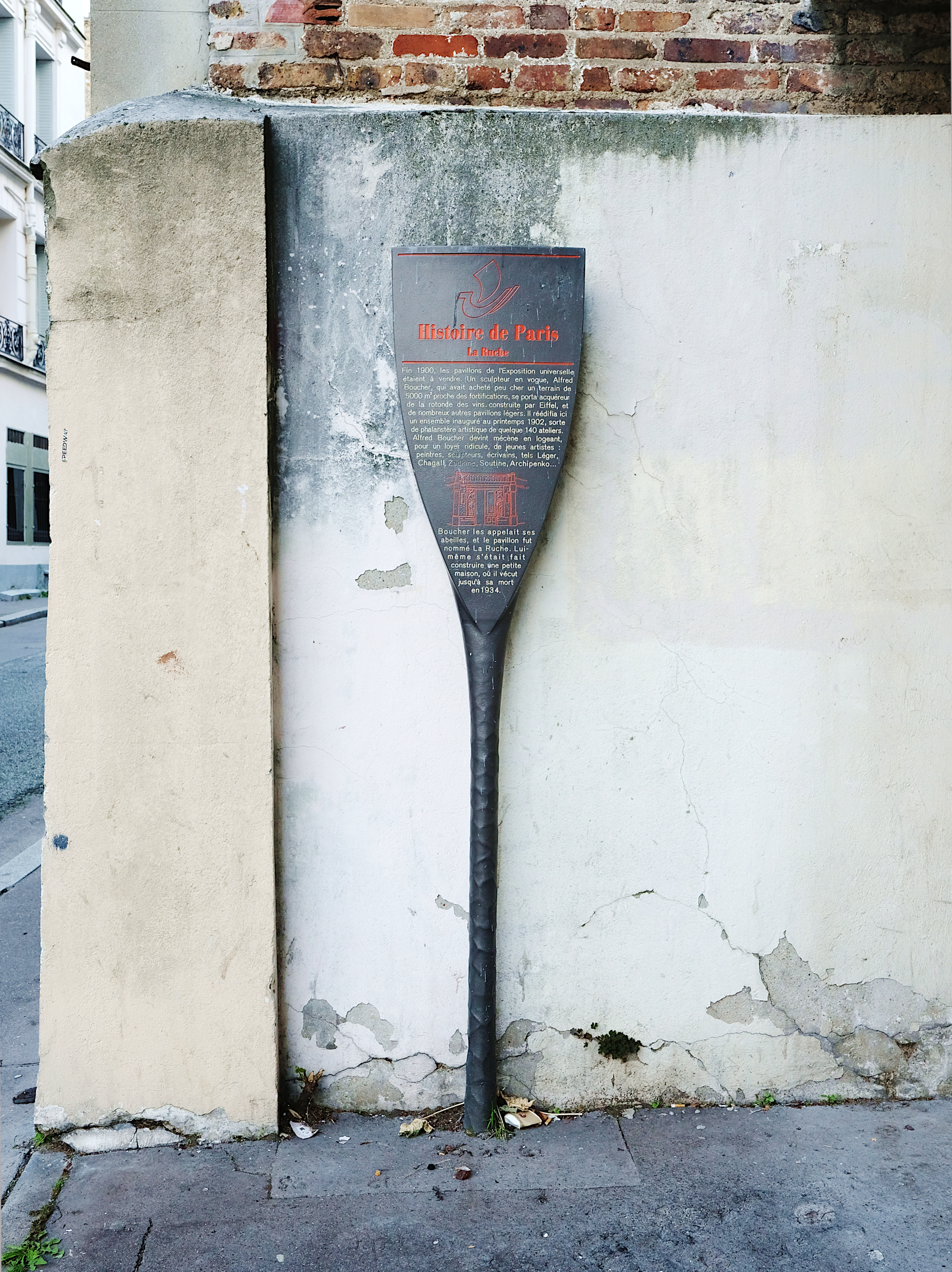
Panneau Histoire de Paris in 2024 : la Ruche.

Like Montmartre, few places have ever housed such artistic talent as found at La Ruche. At one time or another in those early years of the 20th century, Guillaume Apollinaire, Alexander Archipenko, Joseph Csaky, Gustave Miklos, Alexandre Altmann, Ossip Zadkine, Moise Kisling, Marc Chagall, Max Pechstein, Nina Hamnett, Isaac Frenkel Frenel, Fernand Léger, Jacques Lipchitz, Pinchus Kremegne, Max Jacob, Blaise Cendrars, Chaïm Soutine, Robert Delaunay, Amedeo Modigliani, Constantin Brâncuși, Micheal Farrell, Amshey Nurenberg, Diego Rivera, Marevna, Luigi Guardigli, Miklos Bokor, Michel Sima, Marek Szwarc, José Balmes, Gracia Barrios, Wacław Zawadowski, Kazimierz Brandel, Iba N'Diaye and others, called the place home or frequented it. Today, works by some of these poorer residents and their close friends sell well, even in the millions of dollars.

La Ruche went into decline during World War II; and by 1968, amidst a real estate boom, it was threatened with demolition by developers. However, with the support of well known artists such as Jean-Paul Sartre, Alexander Calder, Jean Renoir, and René Char, new management with a preservation mission took over in 1971, and turned it into a collection of working studios.

== Current operations ==
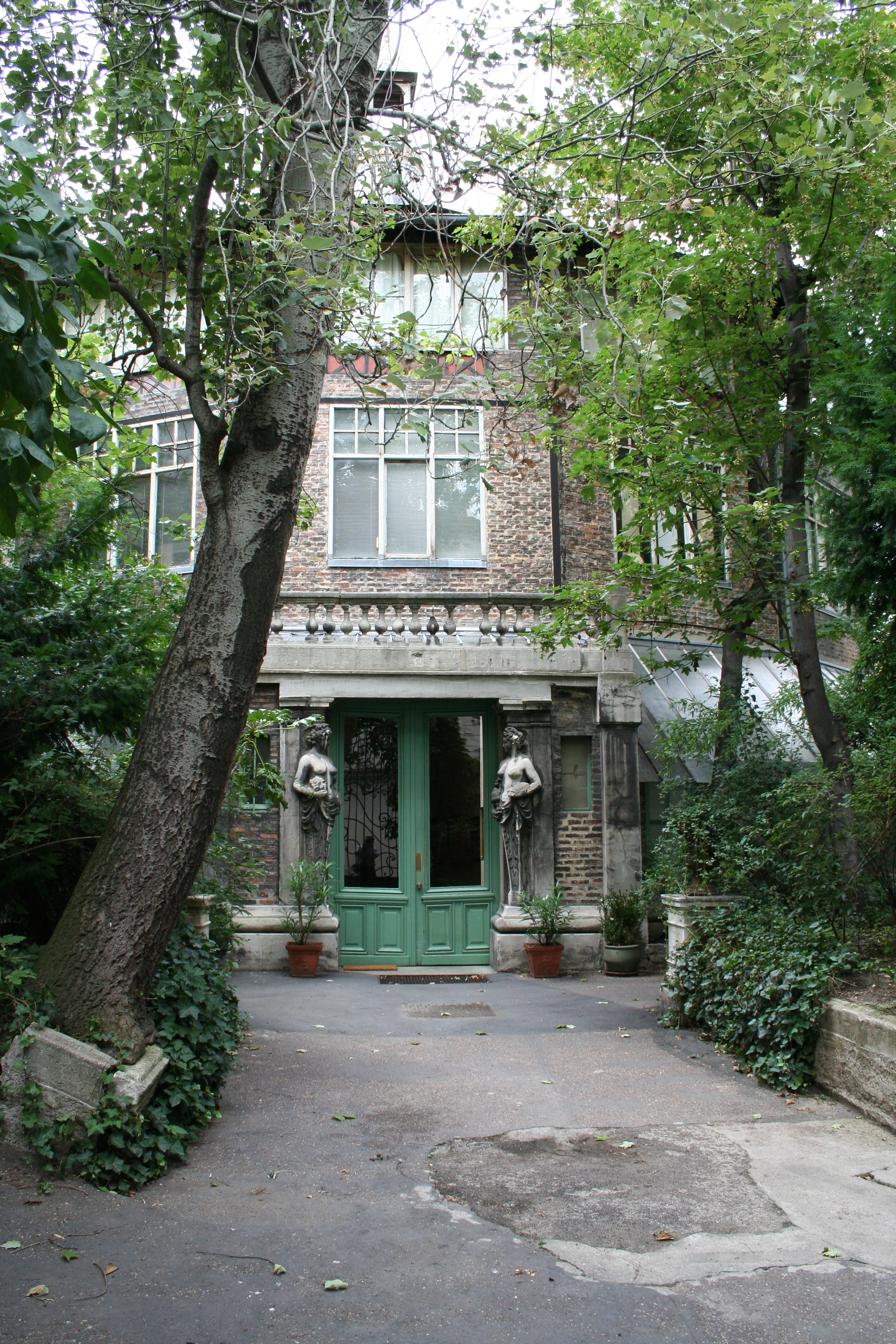
Entrance to the "La Ruche" in Paris

Today, La Ruche has around sixty studios of various sizes, still housing many artists — all tenants — most of whom remain there for life. Ernest Pignon-Ernest, Jean-Miche Alberola, Jan Olsson, Nicky Rieti, Jean-Pierre Péraro, Mathieu Weiler, Anna Foka, Romain Bernini, Marie Désert, Adeline André, Bogdan Pavlovic, Philippe Lagautrière, Isabelle Muller, Bertrand Henry, Régis Rizzo, Zoreh Ramezani, Ianna Andréadis, Michèle Van Der Roer, Christiane Aubard, Isabelle Geoffroy-Dechaume, Marie-Pierre Guillon, Alice Lothon, Yves Robuschi, Himat, Betty Bommel, Cecilia Cubarle, Ruth Barabash, Nelly Maurel, Myung-Ok Han, Stéphane Guénier, Najah Albukai, Michaël Gaumnitz, Daniel Lebée, Lereste, Soustiel.

Unlike other artists' colonies, La Ruche is no longer open to the public: only residents and a few privileged visitors have access, by invitation. Its interior is not open to the general public, although many consider that the exterior of La Ruche alone is worth a visit. Since 2017, La Ruche has had an exhibition hall located on the ground floor in Passage Dantzig, open all year round and hosting two openings per month. Access to the hall does not allow visitors to tour the rest of La Ruche.

== International ==
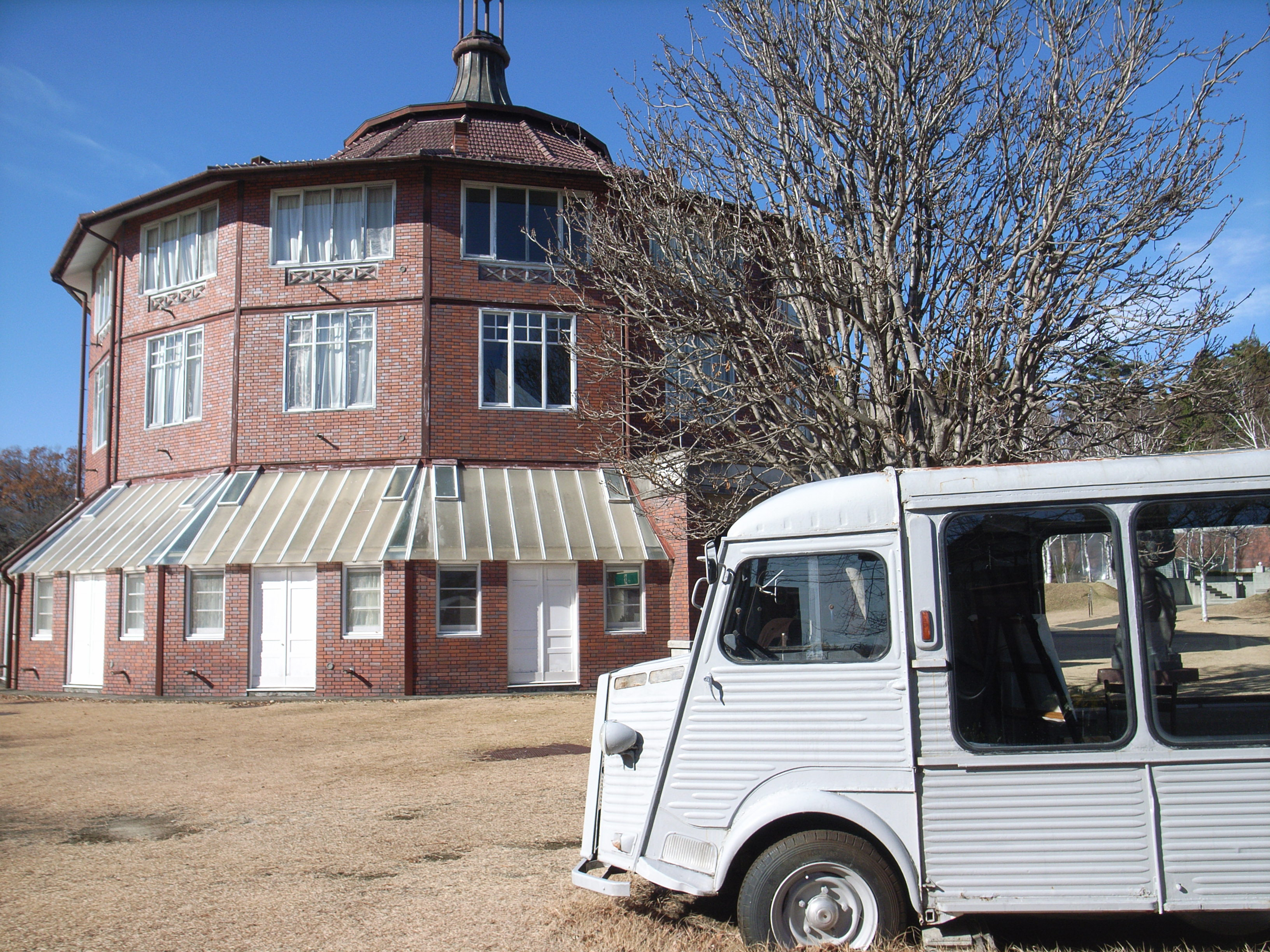
Kiyoharu Shirakaba Museum, December 2021

A reconstruction of the circular building La Ruche was completed in 1981 in Hokuto, Japan, and has since been used by artists as studios.

== See also ==
- Le Bateau-Lavoir, in Montmartre, Paris.
- The School of Paris (art movement)
