= Henri Bosco =

French writer

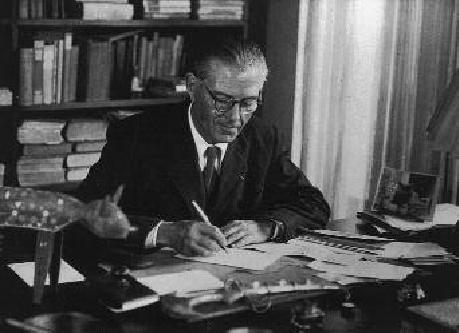

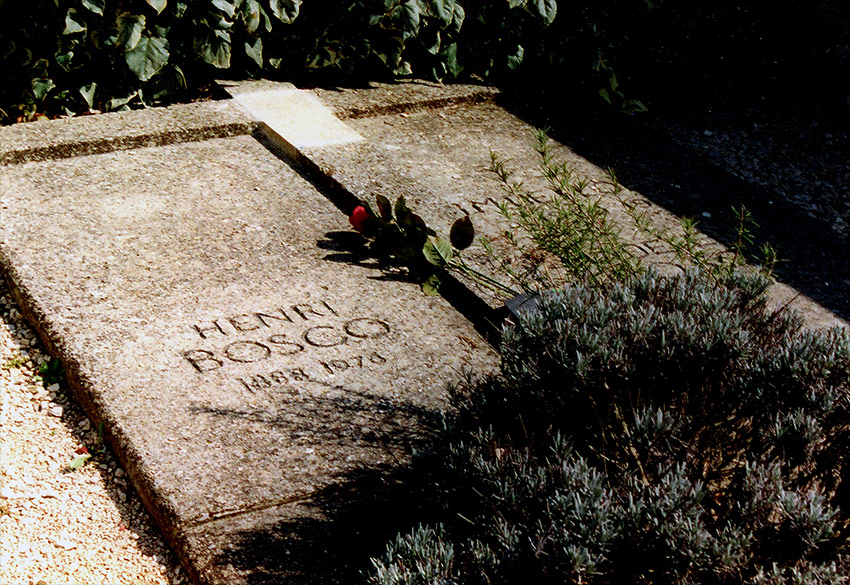
Bosco's gravestone at the cemetery of Lourmarin

Henri Bosco (16 November 1888 – 4 May 1976) was a French writer. He was nominated for the Nobel Prize in Literature four times.

== Life ==
Bosco was born in Avignon, Vaucluse, into a family of Provençal, Ligurian and Piedmontese origin. Through his father, he was related to Saint John Bosco, of whom he wrote a biography. His novels for adults and children provide a sensitive evocation of Provençal life. In 1945, he was awarded the Prix Renaudot for his novel Le Mas Théotime (The Farm Théotime). Other awards he received were the Prix des Ambassadeurs in 1949, the Grand prix national des Lettres in 1953, the Prix de l'Académie de Vaucluse in 1966, the Grand prix de la Mediterranée in 1967, and the Grand Prix de Littérature de l'Académie française in 1968. He died in Nice and was buried at the cemetery of Lourmarin.

== Bibliography ==
- Pierre Lampédouze, 1924
- Le Sanglier, 1932
- Le Trestoulas with L'Habitant de Sivergues, 1935
- L'Ane Culotte, 1937 (Translated by Sister Mary Theresa McCarthy, Culotte the Donkey, 1978). Published in 1950 with illustrations by Nicolas Eekman.
- Hyacinthe, 1940
- L'Apocalypse de Saint Jean 1942
- Bucoliques de Provence, 1944
- Le Jardin d'Hyacinthe, 1945
- Le Mas Théotime, 1945 (Prix Renaudot 1945) (Translated by Mervyn Savill, The Farm Théotime, 1946)
- L'Enfant et la Rivière, 1945 (Translated by Gerard Hopkins, The Boy and the River, 1956; translated by Joyce Zonana, The Child and the River, 2023.)
- Monsieur Carre-Benoît à la campagne, 1947 (Translated by Mervyn Savill, Monsieur Carre-Benoît in the Country, 1958)
- Sylvius, 1948
- Malicroix, 1948 (translated by Joyce Zonana, 2020. ISBN 9781681374109)
- Le Roseau et la Source, 1949
- Un Rameau de la nuit, 1950 (Translated by Mervyn Savill, The Dark Bough, 1955)
- Des sables à la mer. Pages marocaines, 1950
- Sites et Mirages, 1951
- Antonin, 1952
- L'Antiquaire, 1954
- Le Renard dans l'île, 1956 (Translated by Gerard Hopkins, The Fox in the Island, 1958)
- Les Balesta, 1956
- Sabinus, 1957
- Barboche, 1957 (Translated by Gerard Hopkins, Barboche, 1959)
- Bargabot, 1958
- Saint Jean Bosco, 1959
- Un Oubli moins profond, 1961
- Le Chemin de Monclar, 1962
- L'Epervier, 1963
- Le Jardin des Trinitaires, 1966
- Mon Compagnon de songes, 1967
- Le Récif, 1971
- Tante Martine, 1972
- Une Ombre, 1978
- Des nuages, 1980
