= Paule du Bouchet =

French writer (born 1951)

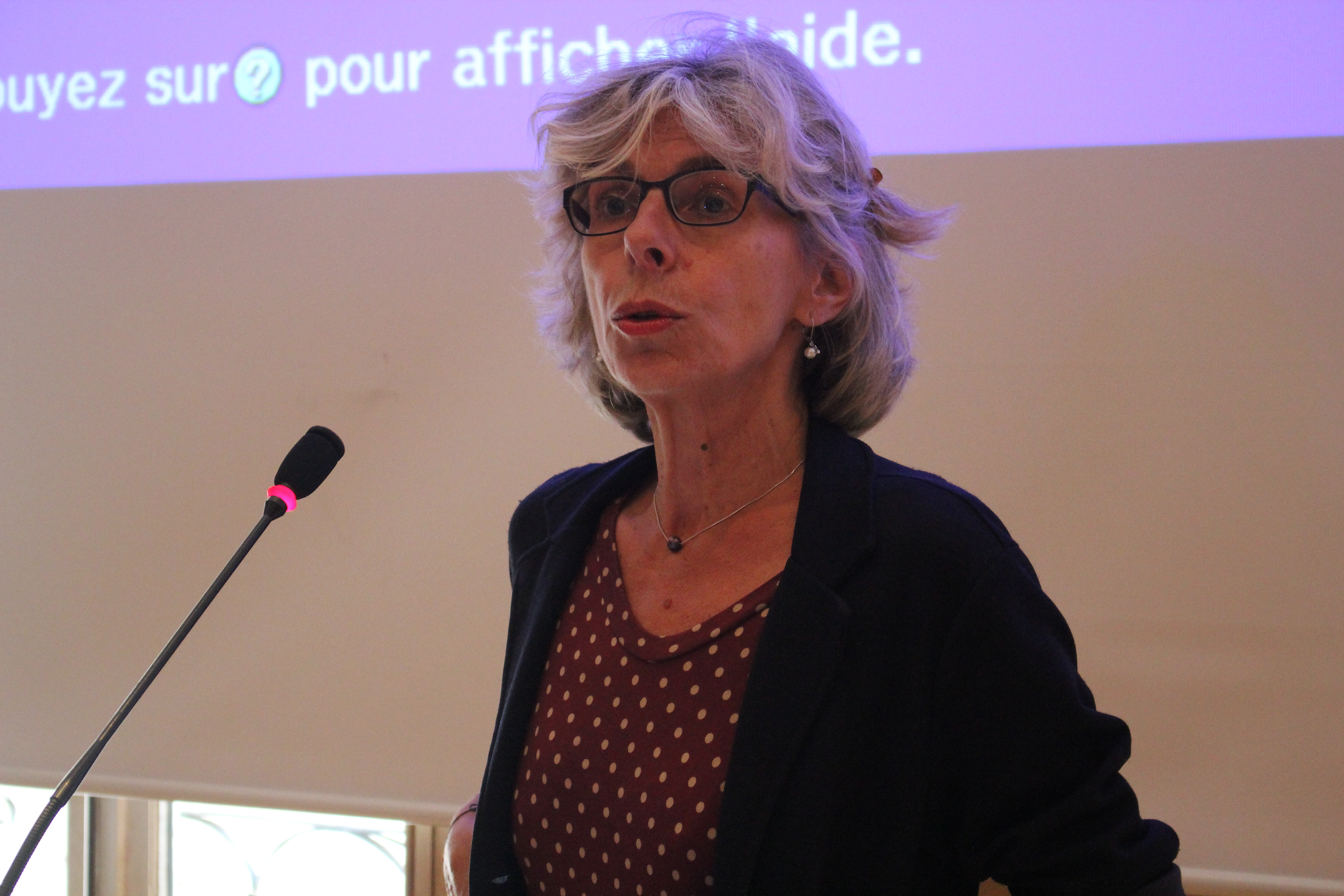
- Paule du Bouchet in 2015
- Born: 19 April 1951 (age 75)
- Occupation: Youth literature writer
- Parents: André du Bouchet (father); Tina Jolas (mother)

Paule du Bouchet (born 19 April 1951) is a French writer, novelist and author of several books for youth. She is currently in charge of the Music Department of Gallimard Jeunesse.

== Career ==
Paule du Bouchet was born on 19 April 1951, daughter of André du Bouchet and Tina Jolas, Tina left the poet André and 6-year-old Paule for another poet René Char in 1957.

She is passionate about music and pianist. Before working in book publishing, she studied philosophy and music, then she taught philosophy and gave musical training to children. She has been a journalist of the French magazine Okapi (Bayard Presse) from 1978 to 1985. Later she turned her career towards publishing and youth literature. She has written many novels, including Chante, Luna in 2004, Le journal d’Adèle in 2007, À la vie à la mort, Comme un ours en cage, et cetera. She currently has published more than 40 works at Éditions Gallimard and is director of “Écoutez lire” since 2004, a collection of audiobooks produced by Gallimard. She was also responsible for the Musique series of “Découvertes Gallimard” collection, and was its editor from 1984 to 1996; as well as director of the “Découvertes Gallimard Texto”, a sub-collection published in “Découvertes” since 1998. Her book Picasso : Le sage et le fou, co-written with Marie-Laure Bernadac, from the same collection, was one of the bestsellers in France.

At an interview with Le Monde de l'éducation, Paule shared her thoughts on youth literature: “Writing for teenagers involves two constraints that on the one hand, a simple expression, a clear writing style, direct without being simplistic; on the other hand, the expression of big questions, profound and existential ones that accompany adolescence and guide us as a lantern in the night –even if we are not aware of it later– in our whole life.”

== Selected publications ==
- Co-author with Marie-Laure Bernadac, Picasso : Le sage et le fou, collection « Découvertes Gallimard » (nº 4), série Arts. Éditions Gallimard, 1986 (new edition in 2007)
  - UK edition – Picasso: Master of the New, ‘New Horizons’ series. Thames & Hudson, 1993
  - US edition – Picasso: Master of the New Idea, “Abrams Discoveries” series. Harry N. Abrams, 1993
- Magnificat : Jean-Sébastien Bach, le cantor, collection « Découvertes Gallimard » (nº 116), série Arts. Éditions Gallimard, 1991
- Le journal d’Adèle, collection « Folio Junior » (nº 876). Éditions Gallimard, 1995 (new edition in 2007)
- À la vie à la mort, collection « Pôle Fiction » (nº 85). Éditions Gallimard, 1999 (new edition in 2016)
- Comme un ours en cage, collection « Folio Junior » (nº 1139). Éditions Gallimard, 2001
- Chante, Luna, collection « Pôle Fiction » (nº 97). Éditions Gallimard, 2004 (new edition in 2016)
- Prince Orpheus, illustrations by Fabian Negrin, J. Paul Getty Museum Publications, 2004
