= Helen Beauclerk =

British writer and translator

- Born: Helen Mary Dorothea Bellingham; 20 September 1892; Cambridge
- Died: 8 July 1969 (aged 76)
- Other names: Helen de Vere Beauclerk

Helen Mary Dorothea Bellingham (20 September 1892 – 8 July 1969), known as Helen Beauclerk, or sometimes Helen de Vere Beauclerk, was a British writer and translator.

== Biography ==
Helen Beauclerk was born in Cambridge in 1892 to Major Sydney Edwin Bellingham and Helen Mary Dunlop. Her father was in the British army and was based in India where he died just a year after she was born. She was then adopted by a family friend, Major Ferdinand de Vere Beauclerk.

Beauclerk was educated in the Conservatoire de Paris and worked as a music teacher and piano accompanist until the start of the First World War when she returned to the United Kingdom. She worked for the London Evening Standard and the Birmingham Post. While in Britain she met the artist Edmund Dulac and they lived together from 1924 until his death. She modelled for him and he illustrated two of her novels, The Green Lacquer Pavilion and The Love of the Foolish Angel. In addition to being a model for some of Dulac's work, she was also painted by George Washington Lambert in 1914.

Beauclerk wrote fantasy novels which leaned heavily on the tradition of French fantastic fiction. As well as writing novels, Beauclerk translated works by Colette, Dominique Lapierre and Louis-René des Forêts into English. .

== Bibliography ==
=== Fiction ===
- The Tale of Igor (1918), with illustrations by Michel Sevier
- The Green Lacquer Pavilion (1926)
- The Love of the Foolish Angel (1929)
- The Mountain and the Tree (1935)
- Shadows On the Wall (1941)
- Where the Treasure Is (1944)
- There Were Three Men (1949)

=== Non-fiction ===
- Earthly Paradise (1974)

=== Translations ===
- Earthly Paradise by Colette
- My Apprenticeships by Colette
- The Beggars by Louis-René des Forêts
- Honeymoon Round the World by Dominique Lapierre
- War Nursing: What Every Woman Should Know by Charles Richet
