= Edmund Dulac =

French-British illustrator (1882–1953)

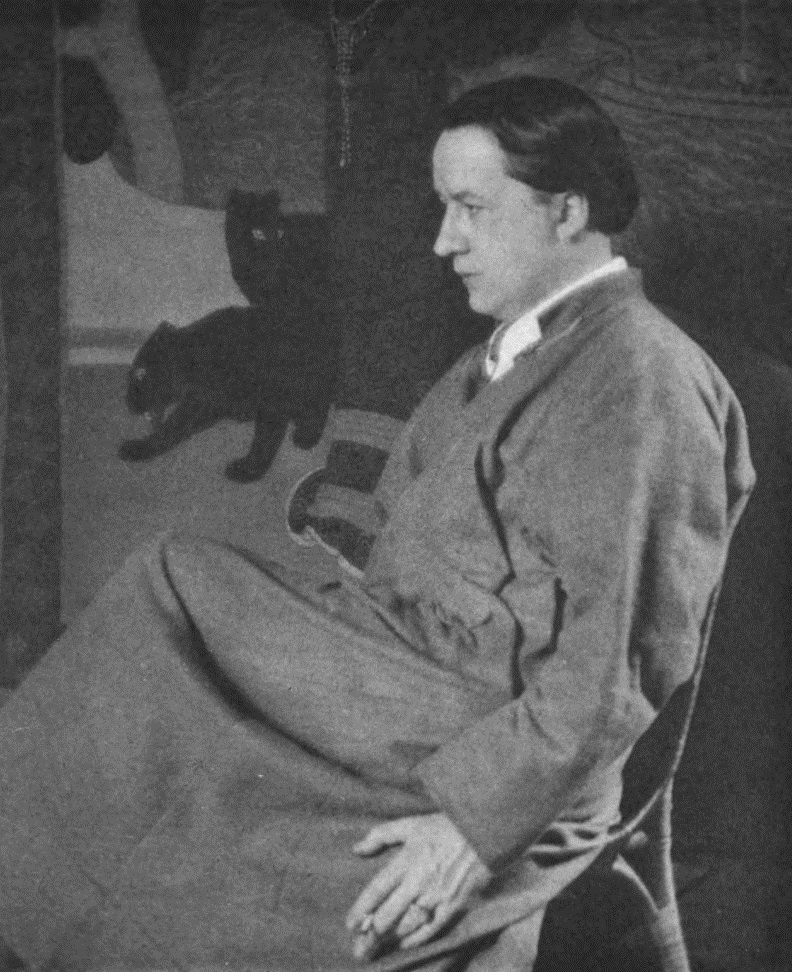
- Edmund Dulac, 1914
- Born: Edmond Dulac; 22 October 1882; Toulouse, France
- Died: 25 May 1953 (aged 70); London, England
- Education: Ecole des Beaux Arts; Académie Julian
- Known for: Painter, illustrator
- Movement: Orientalist

Edmund Dulac (born Edmond Dulac; 22 October 1882 – 25 May 1953) was a French-British naturalised magazine illustrator, book illustrator and stamp designer. Born in Toulouse, he studied law but later turned to the study of art at the École des Beaux-Arts. He moved to London early in the 20th century and in 1905 received his first commission to illustrate the novels of the Brontë Sisters. During World War I, Dulac produced relief books. After the war, the deluxe children's book market shrank, and he then turned to magazine illustrations among other ventures. He designed banknotes during World War II and postage stamps, most notably those that heralded the beginning of Queen Elizabeth II's reign.

== Early life and career ==
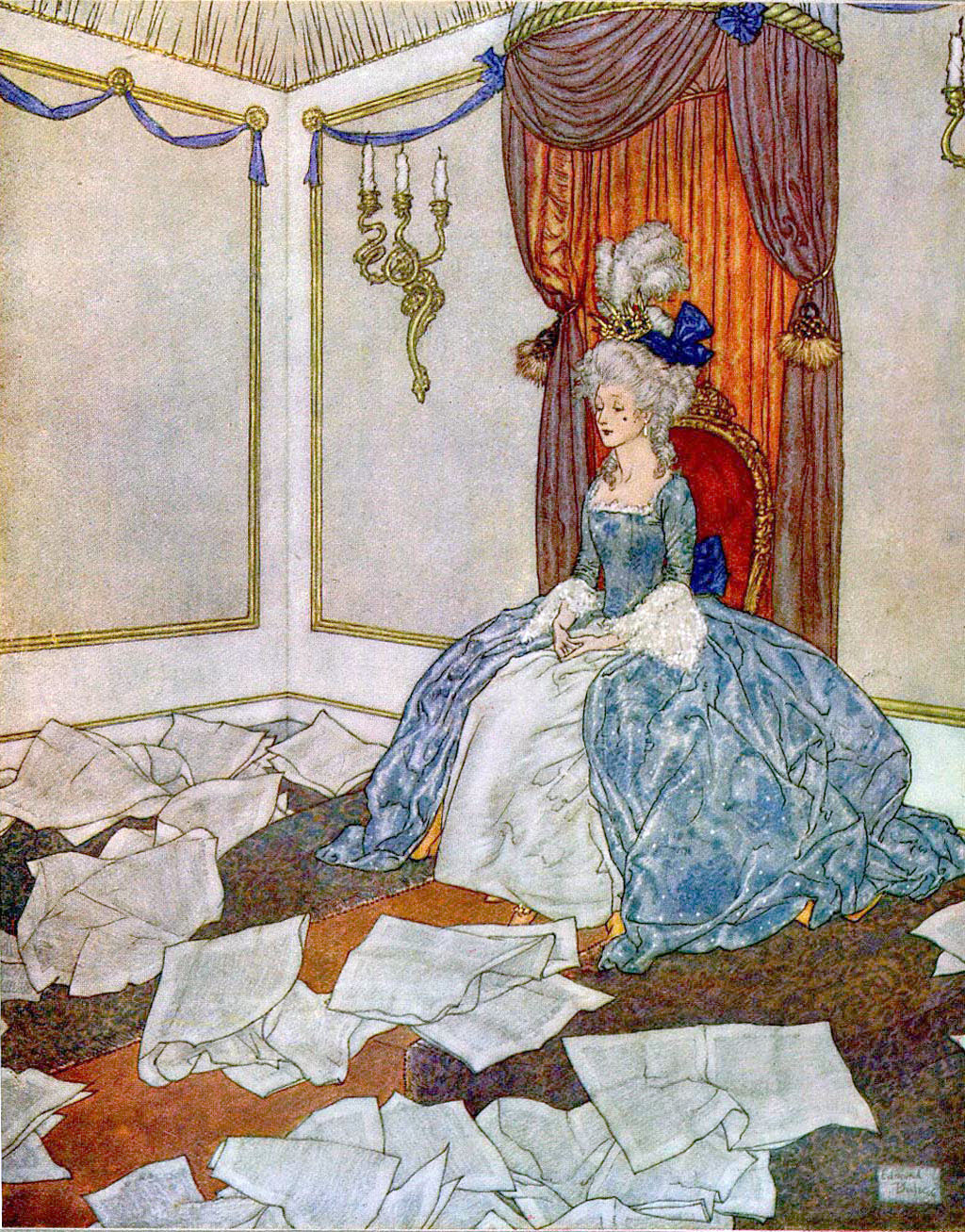
Dulac illustration "She had read all the newspapers" from "The Snow Queen" in Stories from Hans Christian Andersen, London, Hodder & Stoughton, Ltd., 1911

Born in Toulouse, France, he began his career by studying law at the University of Toulouse. He also studied art, switching to it full-time after he became bored with law, and having won prizes at the Ecole des Beaux Arts. He spent a very brief period at the Académie Julian in Paris in 1904 before moving to London.

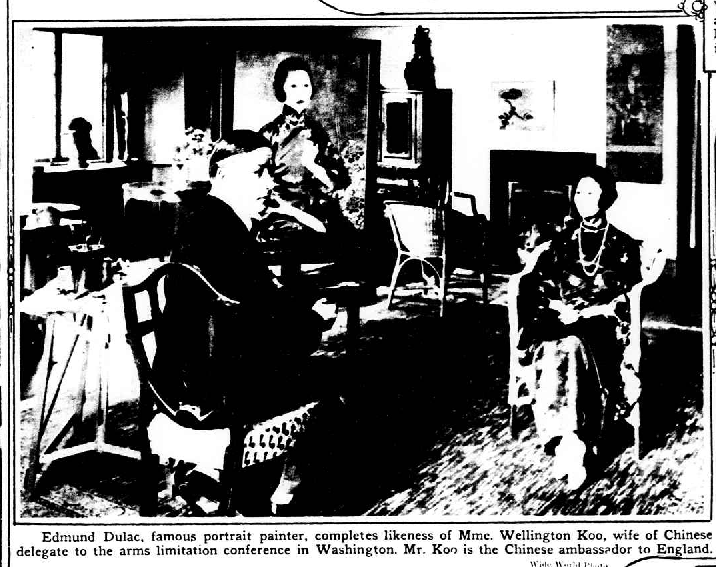
Dulac painting Mrs. Wellington Koo, circa 1921.

Settling in London's Holland Park, the 22-year-old Frenchman was commissioned by the publisher J. M. Dent to illustrate Jane Eyre. and nine other volumes of works by the Brontë sisters. He then became a regular contributor to The Pall Mall Magazine, and joined the London Sketch Club, which introduced him to the foremost book and magazine illustrators of the day. Through these he began an association with the Leicester Galleries and Hodder & Stoughton; the gallery commissioned illustrations from Dulac which they sold in an annual exhibition, while publishing rights to the paintings were taken up by Hodder & Stoughton for reproduction in illustrated gift books, publishing one book a year. Books produced under this arrangement by Dulac include Stories from The Arabian Nights (1907) with 50 colour images; an edition of William Shakespeare's The Tempest (1908) with 40 colour illustrations; The Rubaiyat of Omar Khayyam (1909) with 20 colour images; The Sleeping Beauty and Other Fairy Tales (1910); Stories from Hans Christian Andersen (1911); The Bells and Other Poems by Edgar Allan Poe (1912) with 28 colour images and many monotone illustrations; and Princess Badoura (1913).

Dulac became a naturalised British citizen on 17 February 1912.

During World War I he contributed to charitable relief books, including King Albert's Book (1914), Princess Mary's Gift Book, and, unusually, his own Edmund Dulac's Picture-Book for the French Red Cross (1915) including 20 colour images. Hodder and Stoughton also published The Dreamer of Dreams (1915), a work composed by the then Queen of Romania, Marie of Edinburgh, including 6 colour images, one of which is The Ice Maiden. The original is in the collection of The Royal Pavilion, Art Gallery and museums, Brighton, and is a watercolor with bodycolor work, 12x10 inches.

Dulac was married twice, first to Alice May de Marini, American (m. 1903; div.1904), then to Elsa Arnalice Bignardi (m.1911; sep. or div. 1924).

After Dulac separated from his second wife in 1924, he lived with British writer Helen Beauclerk until his death in 1953. Dulac frequently used her as a model for his illustrations, and illustrated her two novels, The Green Lacquer Pavilion (1926) and The Love of the Foolish Angel (1929).

== Later life ==
After the war, the deluxe edition illustrated book became a rarity and Dulac's career in this field was over. His last such books were Edmund Dulac's Fairy Book (1916), the Tanglewood Tales (1918) (including 14 colour images) and The Kingdom of the Pearl (1920). His career continued in other areas however, including newspaper caricatures (especially at The Outlook), portraiture, theatre costume and set design, bookplates, chocolate boxes, medals, and various graphics (especially for The Mercury Theatre, Notting Hill Gate).

He also produced illustrations for The American Weekly, a Sunday supplement belonging to the Hearst newspaper chain in America and Britain's Country Life. Country Life Limited (London) published Gods and Mortals in Love (1935) (including 9 colour images) based on a number of the contributions made by Dulac to Country Life previously. The Daughter of the Stars (1939) was a further publication to benefit from Dulac's artwork - due to constraints related to the outbreak of World War II, that title included just 2 colour images. He continued to produce books for the rest of his life, more so than any of his contemporaries, although these were less frequent and less lavish than during the Golden Age.

Halfway through his final book commission (Milton's Comus), Dulac died of a heart attack on 25 May 1953 in London.

== Stamp design ==
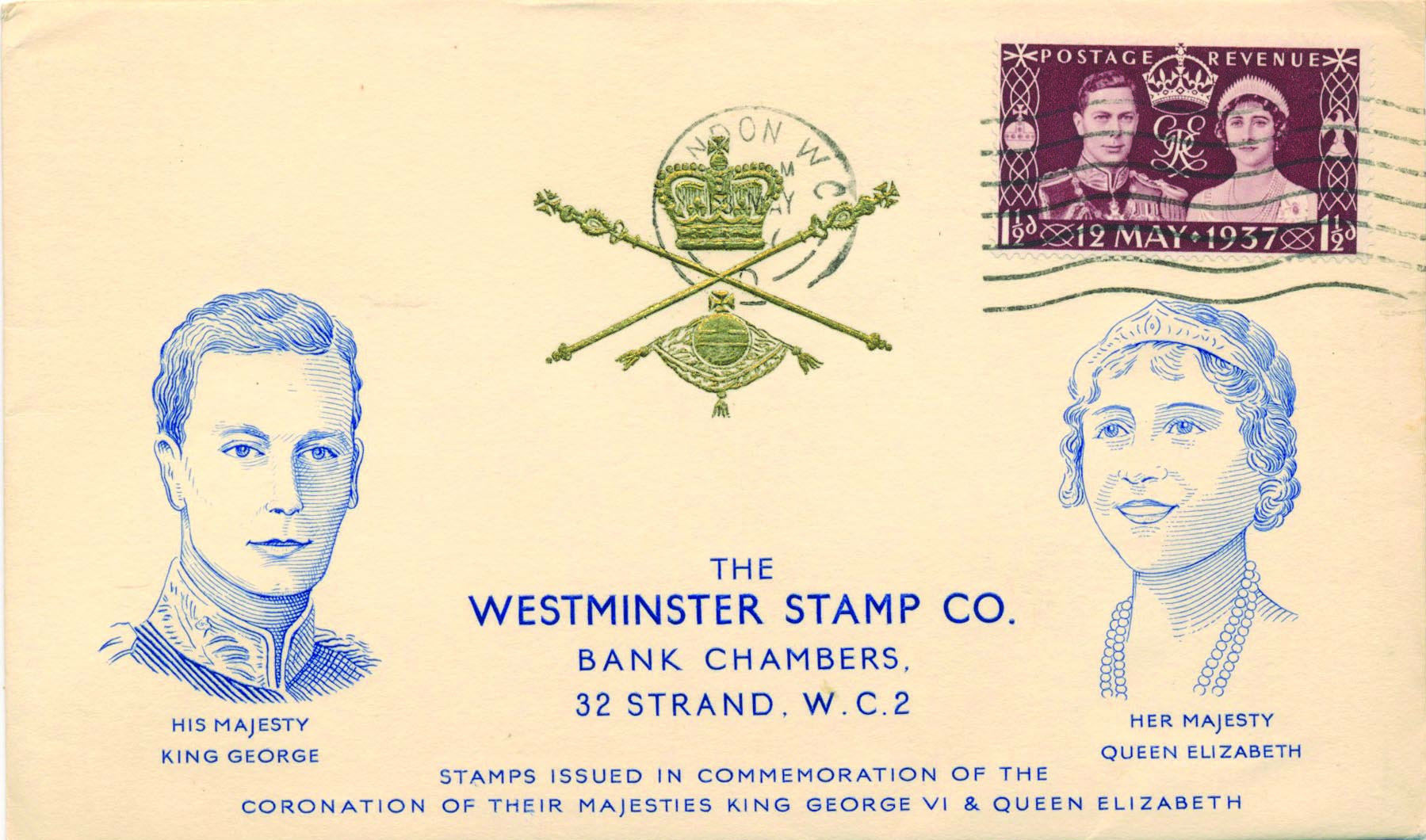
First Day Cover of King George VI showing the coronation stamp designed by Dulac

He designed postage stamps for the United Kingdom, including the postage stamp issued to commemorate the Coronation of King George VI that was issued on 13 May 1937. The head of the King used on all the stamps of that reign was his design and he also designed the 2s 6d and 5s values for the 'arms series' high value definitives and contributed designs for the sets of stamps issued to commemorate the 1948 Summer Olympics and the Festival of Britain.

Dulac was one of the designers of the Wilding series stamps, which were the first definitive stamps of the reign of Queen Elizabeth II. He was responsible for the frame around the image of the Queen on the 1s, 1s 3d and 1s 6d values although his image of the Queen was rejected in favour of a photographic portrait by Dorothy Wilding to which he carried out some modifications by hand. He also designed the 1s 3d value stamp of the set issued to commemorate the Coronation of Queen Elizabeth II but he died just before it was issued.

Dulac designed stamps (Marianne de Londres series) and banknotes for Free France during World War II. In the early 1940s Edmund Dulac also prepared a project for a Polish 20-zlotych note for the Bank of Poland. This banknote (printed in England in 1942 but dated 1939) was ordered by the Polish Government in Exile and was never issued.

== Books by Dulac ==
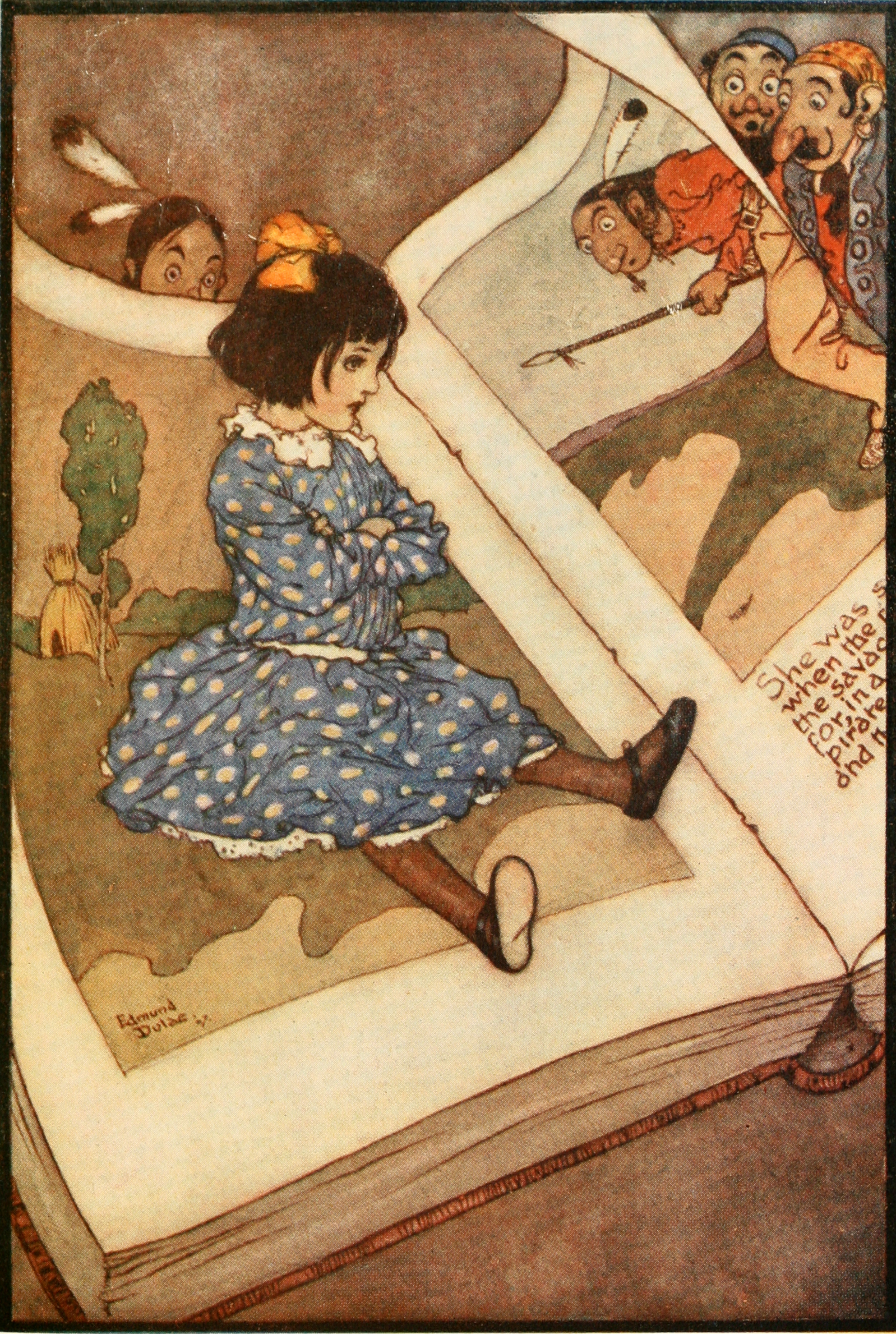
Illustration to "A Little Girl in a Book", from Fairies I Have Met by Mrs. Rodolph Stawell

- Bronte, C. - The Novels of the Bronte Sisters, Dent 1905
- Stawell, M. M. - Fairies I Have Met, Lane 1907
- ____ Stories from the Arabian Nights, Hodder & Stoughton, London, 1907
- Dulac, E. - Lyrics, Pathetic and Humorous from A to Z, Warne 1908
- Shakespeare, W. - The Tempest, Hodder & Stoughton, London, 1908
- ____ The Rubaiyat of Omar Khayyam, Hodder & Stoughton, London, 1909
- Couch, A. T. Q. - The Sleeping Beauty, Hodder & Stoughton, London, 1910
- ____ Ali Baba and other stories, Hodder & Stoughton, London, 1911
- ____ The Magic Horse, Hodder & Stoughton, London, 1911
- Andersen, H. C. - Stories from Hans Andersen, Hodder & Stoughton, London, 1911
- Poe, E. A. - The Bells, and other poems, Hodder & Stoughton, London, 1912
- ____ Princess Badoura, Hodder & Stoughton, London, 1913
- Stawell, M. M. - My Days With the Fairies, Hodder & Stoughton, London, 1913
- ____ Sindbad the Sailor and other stories, Hodder & Stoughton, London, 1914
- Dulac, E. - Edmund Dulac's Picture Book, Hodder & Stoughton, London, 1915
- Mary, Queen of Roumania The Dreamer of Dreams, Hodder & Stoughton, London, 1915
- Dulac, E. - Edmund Dulac's Fairy Book, Hodder & Stoughton, London, 1916
- Hawthorne, N. - Tanglewood Tales, Hodder & Stoughton, London, 1918
- Rosenthal, L. - The Kingdom of the Pearl, Nisbet 1920
- Yeats, W. B. - Four Plays for Dancers, Macmillan 1921
- Poe, E. A. - The Poetical Works of Edgar Allan Poe, George H. Doran Company, New York, 1921
- Beauclerk, H. de V. - The Green Lacquer Pavilion, Collins 1926
- Yeats, W. B. - A Vision, Laurie 1926
- Stevenson, R. L. - Treasure Island, Benn 1927
- ____ A Fairy Garland, Cassell 1928
- Williamson, H. R. - Gods and Mortals in Love, Country Life 1935
- Cary, M. - The Daughter of the Stars, Hatchard 1939
- Apulius, Lucius. - The Marriage of Cupid and Psyche. Limited Editions Club 1951
- Milton, J. - Comus, Limited Editions Club 1954
- Alexander Pushkin, - The Golden Cockerel, Limited Editions Club published in 1950. Dulac wrote the version in English of Pushkin's tale used in the book. In addition to the illustrations, he designed the layout of the book, page by page.

== Gallery ==
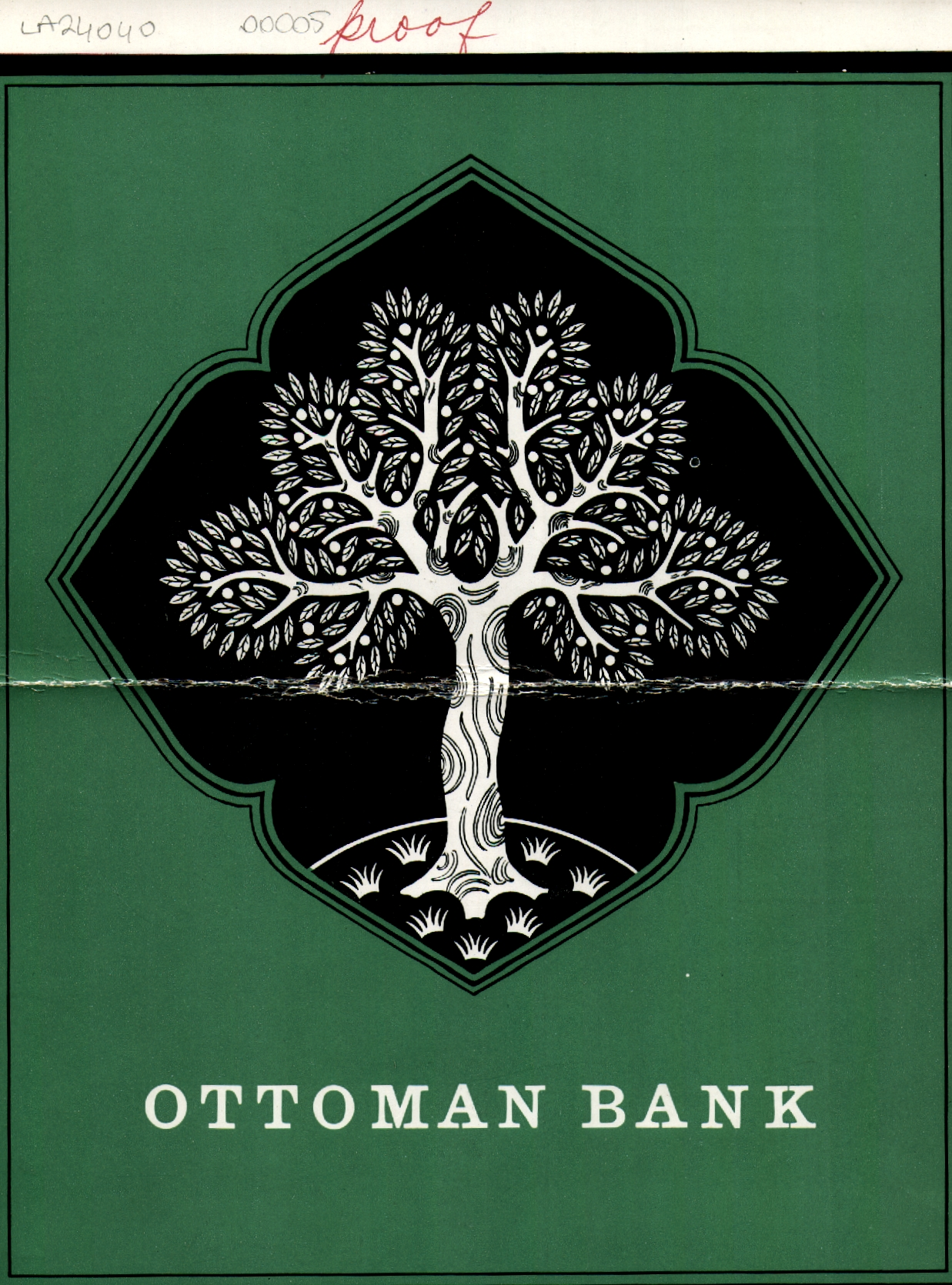
Ottoman Bank logo, 1947

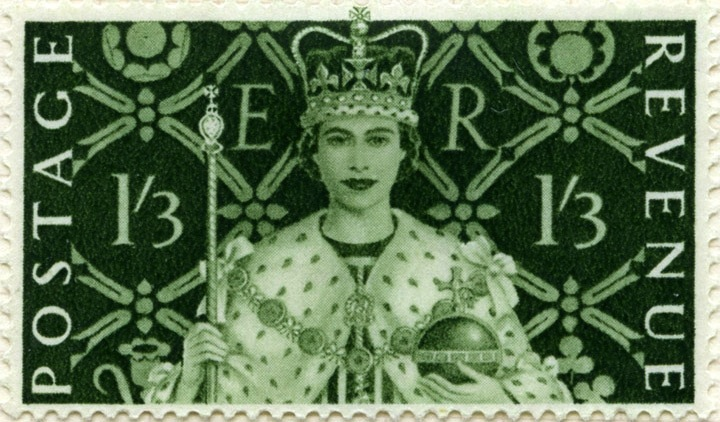
Dulac designed 1953 coronation stamp denominated 1/3

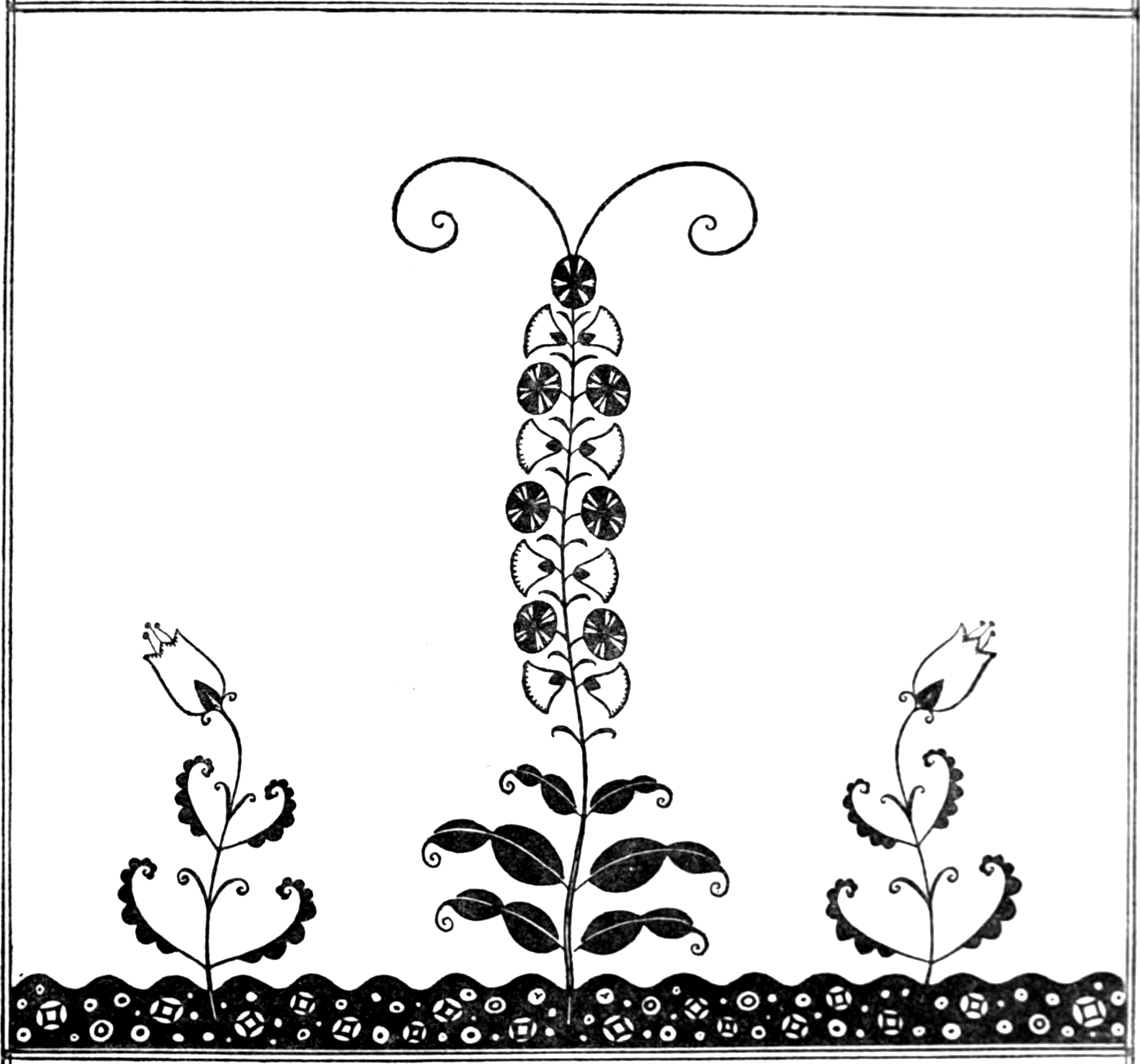
title ornament for Edmund Dulac's picture-book for the French Red Cross, 1916.

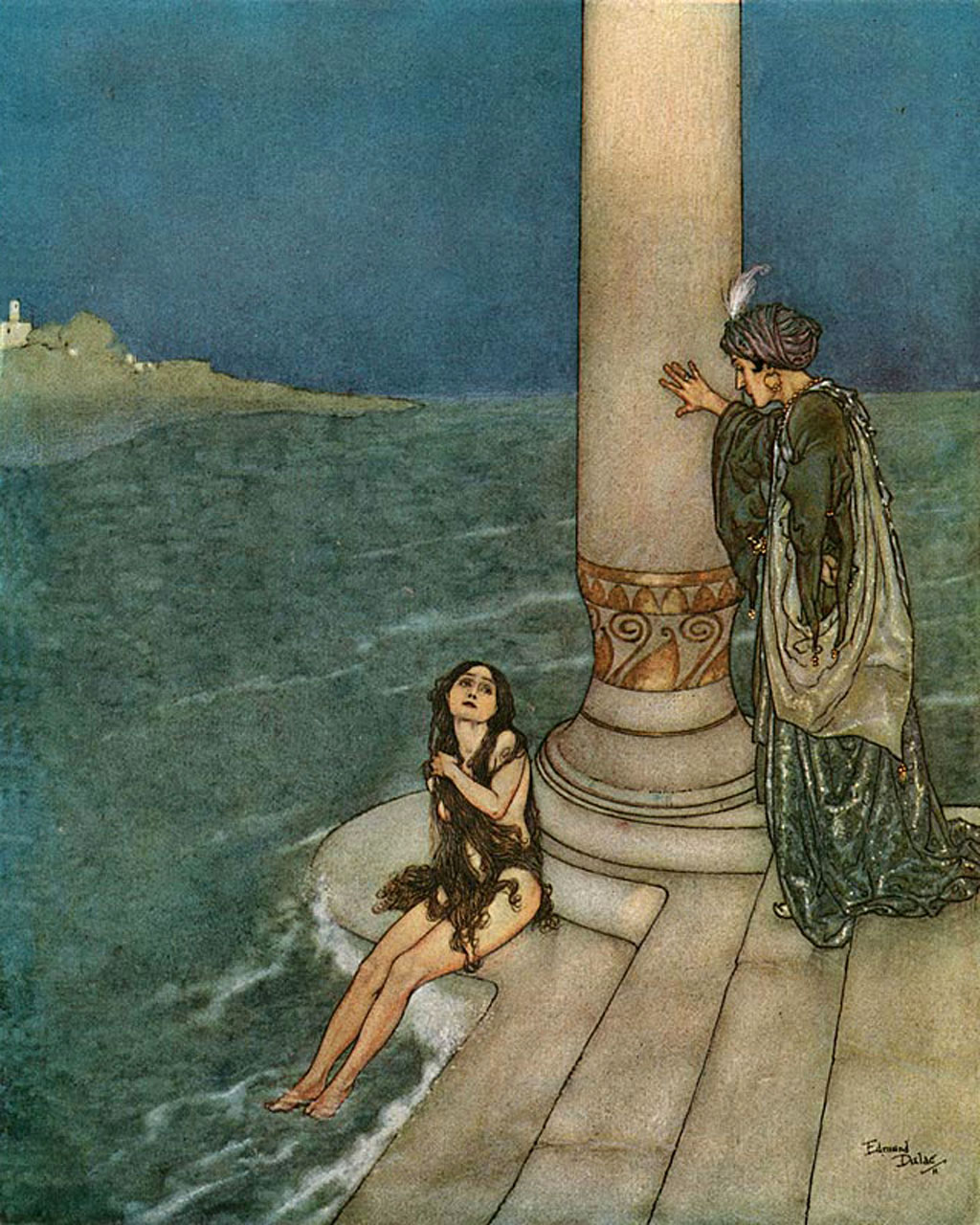
illustration for Hans Christian Andersen's "The Little Mermaid"

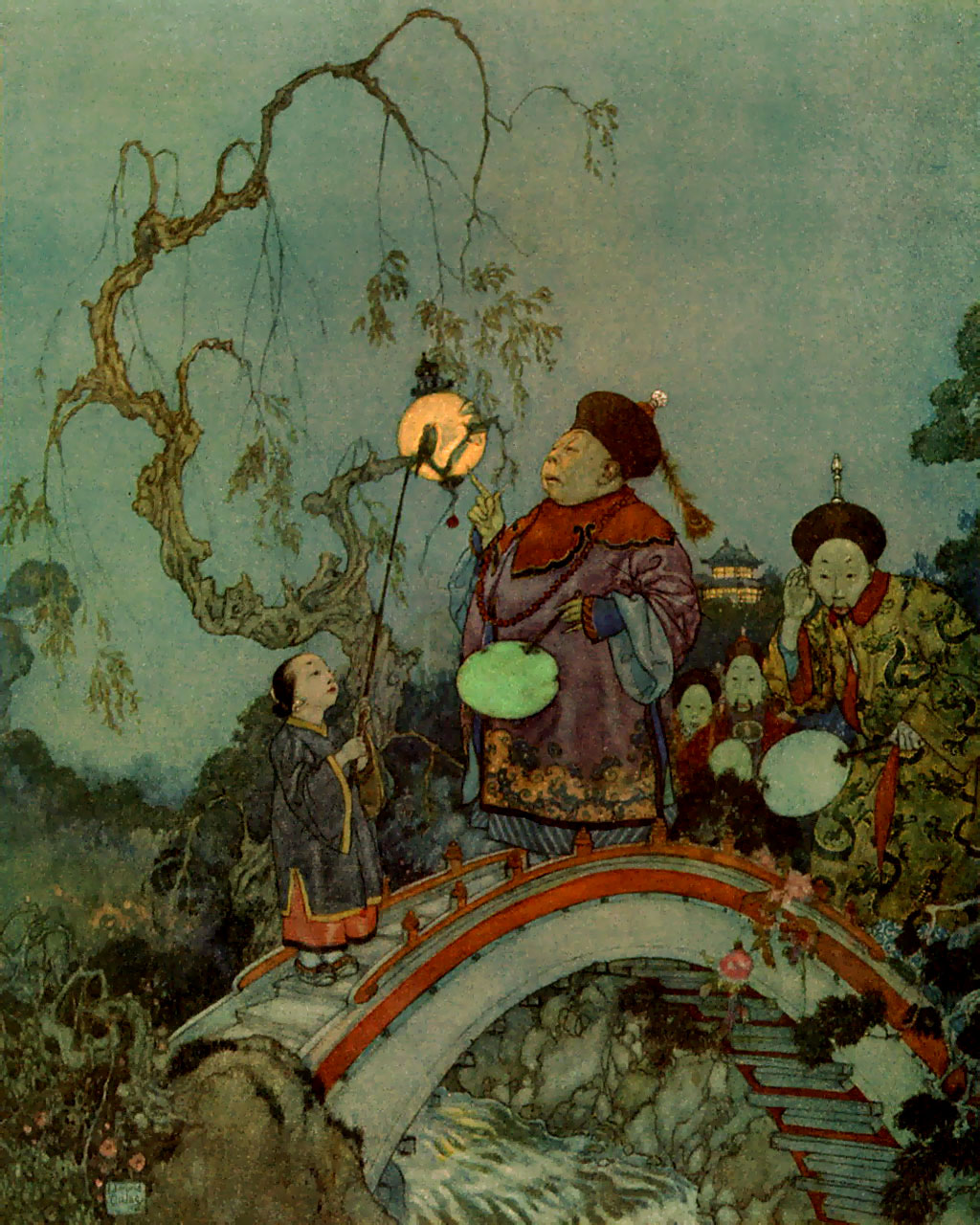
illustration for Andersen's "The Nightingale"

== See also ==
- List of Orientalist artists
- Orientalism
