= Jude Stéfan =

French poet (1930–2020)

- Born: Jacques Dufour; 1 July 1930; Pont-Audemer, France
- Died: 11 November 2020 (aged 90); Orbec, France
- Occupation: Poet
- Notable work: Mit dem Gleichmut eines Schwans, der sich den Hals flöht. Gedichte und Prosa französisch/deutsch. Übersetzt und mit einem Nachwort von HANS RAIMUND. edition pen LÖCKER, Vienna 2023

Jacques Dufour (1 July 1930 – 11 November 2020), known by the pen name Jude Stéfan, was a French poet and novelist.

== Biography ==
Stéfan studied law and philosophy. He was a teacher at the Lycée Augustin Fresnel in Bernay where he taught French, Latin, and Greek. Throughout his career, he published numerous novels, essays, and poems.

== Awards ==
- Prix Max-Jacob (1985)
- Grand prix de Poésie de la Ville de Paris (2000)

== Publications ==
=== Poetry ===
- Cyprès (1967)
- Libères (1970)
- Idylles (1973)
- Poésie (1978)
- Aux chiens du soir : poèmes en titre (1979)
- Laures : poèmes (1984)
- Litanies du scribe (1984)
- Alme Diane (1986)
- À la vieille Parque (1989)
- Stances : ou 52 contre-haï-ku (1991)
- Elégiades (1993)
- Prosopopées (1995)
- Povrésies ou 65 poèmes autant d’années (1997)
- Épodes ou poèmes de la désuétude (1999)
- Génitifs (2001)
- La Muse Province (2002)
- Caprices (2004)
- Désespérance, déposition (2006)
- Que ne suis-je Catulle (2010)
- Disparates (2012)

=== Novels ===
- Vie de mon frère (1973)
- La Crevaison (1976)
- Lettres tombales (1983)
- Les États du corps (1987)
- La Fête de la patronne (1991)
- Le nouvelliste (1993)
- Scènes dernières : histoires de vie-mort (1995)
- Vie de Saint (1998)
- Oraisons funestes (2003)
- L’Angliciste (2006)
- L'idiot de village (2008)

=== Essays ===
- Gnomiques ou de l’Inconsolation (1985)
- Faux journal (1986)
- De Catulle : et vingt transcriptions (1990)
- Xénies (1992)
- Scholies (1992)
- Epitomé ou Chrestomathie à l’usage des débutants en littérature (1993)
- Senilia (1994)
- Variété VI (1995)
- Chroniques catoniques (1996)
- Silles (1997)
- Variété VII (2000)
- Pandectes ou le neveu de Bayle (2008)

=== Other works ===
- Suites slaves (1983)
- Les Accidents (1984)
- La Vieille Parque (1984)
- Dialogue avec la sœur (1987)
- Dialogue des figures (1988)
- Les courtisans (1992)
- PrOsEMES (1997)
- Quatre épodes (1998)
- 25 lettres d’alphabet (2000)
- Litanies du scribe (2001)
- Lettre à une morte (2002)
- L’Anti-Pédagogue (2003)
- Le Sillographe (Diurnal invectif 1997-2003 (2004)
- Les Stéfan (2004)
- Thanasies (2005)
- Jude Stéfan, rencontre avec Tristan Hordé (2005)
- Grains & issues (2007)
- Les Commourants (2008)
- Ménippées. P(r)o(s)ésies (2011)
- Factum (2012)

== Interview ==
Stéfan participated in a series of interviews on the CD album L'Usine à muse in 2011. The track he appeared on was titled Je îl(e) déserte.
