= Luigi Guardigli =

Italian painter

Luigi Guardigli (20 July 1923 – 19 September 2008) was an Italian painter and mosaicist.

== Biography ==
Guardigli was born in Ravenna. At 18, he enrolled in and attended the School of Fine Arts of Ravenna. During World War II he was drafted and served from 1943 until 1946 in the Regia Marina (Italian Royal Navy) at La Spezia). After the war, Guardigli returned to the School of Fine Arts, receiving his diploma in 1948. He enrolled in the School of Painting and Mosaics, also in Ravenna, graduating in 1951. From 1951 to 1955, Guardigli worked with the Gruppo mosaicisti of Ravenna and restored many mosaics. Also in 1951, at the end of November, he arrived in Paris to teach at the Ecole d'Art Italien (School of Italian Art) as an assistant to the painter Gino Severini, founder and director of the school. Together with another mosaicist, his fellow Ravennan Lino Melano, Guardigli executed mosaic works for artists including Fernand Léger, Georges Braque, Marc Chagall, Jean Bazaine, and Raoul Ubac. He collaborated also on the mosaic for the façade of the Musée national Fernand Léger in Biot (Alpes-Maritimes). In 1960, Guardigli executed, at the Colombe d'Or of Saint-Paul-de-Vence, a mosaic by the painter Georges Braque. From 1961, he had a studio in the artists' residence La Ruche at 2, passage de Dantzing in Paris, the place described by Lorenzo Viani in the book Parigi 1925 (Paris 1925), published by Fratelli Treves. In 1962, in another collaboration with Braque, Guardigli created the famous long fish tank of the Fondation Maeght in St Paul de Vence. His collaborations with many illustrious artists continued; the last was Jean-Michel Folon. Many of his personal works in painting and mosaics are in prominent private and public collections. The latter portion of his life was spent in an old people's rest home in Paris, where Guardigli died in 2008.

== Some works ==
- 1958 "Société d'Aquitaine" – Mosaic created from designs by A. Beaudin, Paris
- 1958 "Musée Leger" – Mosaic created with Melano Leger, Biot
- 1959 "F Noain" – Mosaic created from designs by Suzanne Roge, Paris
- 1959 "l'Usine d'embouteillage" – Mosaic created from designs by Raoul Ubac, Évian-les-Bains
- 1960 "Colombe d'Or" – Mosaic created from designs by Georges Braque, Saint-Paul-de-Vence
- 1961 "France" – Mosaic created from designs by Jean René Bazaine, Paris
- 1962 "Fondazione Maeght" – Mosaic created from designs by Georges Braque, Saint-Paul-de-Vence
- 1963 "Maison de la radio" – Mosaic created from designs by J. Bazaine, Paris
- 1963 "Maison d'architecte" – Mosaic created from designs by J. Bazaine, Septeuil, Yvelines
- 1963 "Clinique Universitaire" – Mosaic created from designs by J. Lacasse, Freiburg im Breisgau
- 1963 "Maison d'architecte" – Mosaic created from designs by J. Bazaine, Septeuil, Yvelines
- 1964 "groupe scolaire" – Mosaic created from designs by W. Mucha, Pyrenees
- 1965 "CNRS" – Mosaic created from designs by Jullien, Grenoble
- 1965 "Hotel rue de l'Elysée" – Mosaic created from designs by Marc Chagall, Paris
- 1965 "Musée d'Art Mural de Lund" – Mosaic created from designs by J. Bazaine, Sweden
- 1966 "Nuovo Parlamento di Gerusalemme" – Mosaic created from designs by Marc Chagall, Israel
- 1966 "Maison des Jeunes" – Mosaic created from designs by Fernand Léger, Corbeil-Essonnes

== Sources ==
- Jeanine Warnod, La Ruche & Montparnasse – 1978 Weber (Geneva, Paris)
- Comite de defense de La Ruche, "Il faut sauver 'La Ruche'" – April 1969
- Felice Nittolo, "Maestri Mosaicisti a Ravenna prima e dopo la seconda guerra mondiale" – 2006 casa editrice Girasole arte.
- ravennanotizie.it, "E' morto a Parigi il mosaicista ravennate Luigi Guardigli" – 29 September 2008
