= Yves Bonnefoy =

French poet, essayist, and translator (1923–2016)

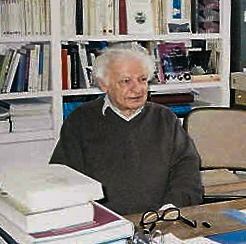
- Bonnefoy in 2004
- Born: Yves Jean Bonnefoy; 24 June 1923; Tours, France
- Died: 1 July 2016 (aged 93); Paris, France
- Education: University of Paris
- Parent(s): Marius Elie-Bonnefoy; Hélène Maury

Yves Jean Bonnefoy (24 June 1923, Tours – 1 July 2016, Paris) was a French poet and art historian. He also published a number of translations, most notably the plays of William Shakespeare which are considered among the best in French. He was a professor at the Collège de France from 1981 to 1993 and is the author of several works on art, art history, and artists including Miró and Giacometti, and a monograph on Paris-based Iranian artist Farhad Ostovani. The Encyclopædia Britannica states that Bonnefoy was ″perhaps the most important French poet of the latter half of the 20th century.″

== Life and career ==
Bonnefoy was born in Tours, Indre-et-Loire, the son of Marius Elie Bonnefoy, a railroad worker, and Hélène Maury, a teacher. He studied mathematics and philosophy at the Universities of Poitiers and the Sorbonne in Paris. After the Second World War he travelled in Europe and the United States and studied art history. From 1945 to 1947 he was associated with the Surrealists in Paris (a short-lived influence that is at its strongest in his first published work, Traité du pianiste (1946)). But it was with the highly personal Du mouvement et de l'immobilité de Douve (On the Motion and Immobility of Douve, 1953) that Bonnefoy found his voice and that his name first came to public notice. Bonnefoy's style is remarkable for the deceptive simplicity of its vocabulary.

Bonnefoy's work has been translated into English by, among others, Emily Grosholz, Galway Kinnell, John Naughton, Alan Baker, Hoyt Rogers, Antony Rudolf, Beverley Bie Brahic and Richard Stamelmann. In 1967 he joined with André du Bouchet, Gaëtan Picon, and Louis-René des Forêts to found L'éphémère, a journal of art and literature. Commenting on his work, Bonnefoy has said:

One should not call oneself a poet. It would be pretentious. It would mean that one has resolved the problems poetry presents. Poet is a word one can use when speaking of others, if one admires them sufficiently. If someone asks me what I do, I say I'm a critic, or a historian.

He taught literature at a number of universities in Europe and in the USA: Brandeis University, Waltham, Massachusetts (1962–64); Centre Universitaire, Vincennes (1969–1970); Johns Hopkins University, Baltimore; Princeton University, New Jersey; University of Connecticut, Storrs, Connecticut;Yale University, New Haven, Connecticut; University of Geneva; University of Nice (1973–1976); University of Provence, Aix (1979–1981); and Graduate Center of the City University of New York, where he was made an honorary member of the Academy of the Humanities and Sciences. In 1981, following the death of Roland Barthes, he was given the chair of comparative study of poetry at the Collège de France.

Bonnefoy continued to work closely with painters throughout his career and wrote prefaces for artists’ books, including those by his friend Miklos Bokor.

Bonnefoy died on 1 July 2016 at the age of 93 in Paris. President François Hollande stated of Bonnefoy on his death that he would be remembered for "elevating our language to its supreme degree of precision and beauty".

== Awards and honours ==
Bonnefoy was honoured with a number of prizes throughout his creative life. Early on he was awarded the Prix des Critiques in 1971. Ten years later, in 1981, The French Academy gave him its grand prize, which was soon followed by the Goncourt Prize for Poetry in 1987. Over the next 15 years, Bonnefoy was awarded both the Prix mondial Cino Del Duca and the Balzan Prize (for Art History and Art Criticism in Europe) in 1995, the Golden Wreath of Struga Poetry Evenings in 1999, and the Grand Prize of the First Masaoka Shiki International Haiku Awards in 2000. Toward the final years of his life, Bonnefoy was recognized with the Franz Kafka Prize in 2007 and, in 2011, he received the Griffin Lifetime Recognition Award, presented by the trustees of the Griffin Poetry Prize. In 2014, he was co-winner of the Janus Pannonius International Poetry Prize. He won the 2015 International Nonino Prize in Italy.

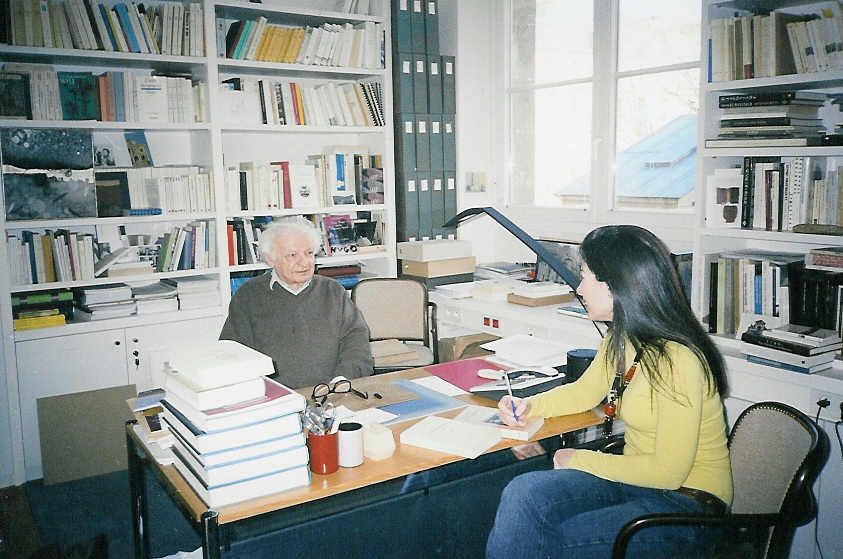
Yves Bonnefoy, Collège de France, 2004 (with Joumana Haddad).

== Bibliography (English language material) ==
=== Poetry ===
Collections

- 1968: On the Motion and Immobility of Douve. Translated by Galway Kinnell. (Ohio University Press: ASIN: B000ILHLXA)
- 1985: Poems: 1959-1975. Translated by Richard Pevear. (Random House: ISBN 9780394533520)
- 1991: In the Shadow's Light. Translated by John Naughton. (University of Chicago Press: 9780226064482)
- 2007: The Curved Planks. Translated by Hoyt Rogers. (Farrar, Straus and Giroux: ISBN 9780374530754).
- 2011: Second Simplicity: New Poetry and Prose, 1991-2011. Selected, translated, and with an introduction by Hoyt Rogers. (Yale University Press: ISBN 978-0-300-17625-4).
- 2012: Beginning and End of the Snow [followed by Where the Arrow Falls]. Translated by Emily Grosholz. (Bucknell University Press: ISBN 978-1611484588)
- 2013: The Present Hour; with an Introduction by Beverley Bie Brahic. (Seagull Books: ISBN 9780857421630)
- 2014: The Digamma; with an introduction by Hoyt Rogers. Translated by Hoyt Rogers. (Seagull Books: ISBN 978 0 8574 2 183 8).
- 2015: The Anchor's Long Chain; with an Introduction by Beverley Bie Brahic. (Seagull Books: ISBN 978-0857423023) (Note: Includes both poems and short stories.)
- 2017: Together Still [followed by Perambulans in Noctem]; with an afterword by Hoyt Rogers. Translated by Hoyt Rogers with Mathilde Bonnefoy. (Seagull Books: ISBN 978 0 8574 2 424 2).

List of poems

Title	Year	First published	Reprinted/collected
The almond tree	1985	Bonnefoy, Yves (January 21, 1985). "The almond tree". The New Yorker. 60 (49): 36.Translated by Richard Pevear.	

=== Non-fiction ===
- Miro. New York: Viking. 1967.
- 1991: Mythologies [2 Volumes]. Compiled by Yves Bonnefoy. Edited by Wendy Doniger. (University of Chicago Press, ISBN 9780226064536) (Note: A restructured translation of Dictionnaire des mythologies et des religions des sociétés traditionelles et du monde antique ("Dictionary of Mythologies and Religions of Traditional Societies and the Ancient World"). Compiled by Yves Bonnefoy and prepared under the direction of Wendy Doniger; translated by Gerald Honigsblum [and others])
- Bonnefoy, Yves, ed. (1992). Roman and European mythologies. Translated under the direction of Wendy Doniger by Gerald Honigsblum et al. Chicago: University of Chicago Press. (Note: Paperback single volume edition derived from the 1991 edition.)
- —, ed. (1993). American, African, and old European mythologies. Translated under the direction of Wendy Doniger by Gerald Honigsblum et al. Chicago: University of Chicago Press.
- 1993: Alberto Giacometti: A Biography of His Work. (Flammarion: ISBN 978-2080135124)
- 1995: The Lure and the Truth of Painting: Selected Essays on Art. (University of Chicago Press, ISBN 9780226064444)
- 2004: Shakespeare and the French Poet. (University of Chicago Press: ISBN 9780226064437)

———————

Bibliography notes
