= Éditions Fata Morgana =

Éditions Fata Morgana is a French publishing house founded in 1966 that specializes in books on the arts and literature.

== History ==
The publishing house was founded in 1966 by Bruno Roy and Claude Féraud. Its headquarters are located in Saint-Clément-de-Rivière, in Occitanie, France. David Massabuau is Fata Morgana's current director. The publishing house's first book was an unpublished work by Benjamin Péret (in French: Les Mains dans les poches), illustrated with engravings by Robert Lagarde, released before Fata Morgana was officially established. Fata Morgana is known for its philosophy and its high-end literary and art publications, usually in limited editions.

Since its founding, Éditions Fata Morgana has published more than 600 titles by both French and foreign authors, including Paul Valéry, Michel Foucault, Marguerite Yourcenar, Odysseas Elytis, Émile Cioran, Bernard Noël, Christian Bobin, Roger Gilbert-Lecomte, and Jonathan Littell.

Moreover, various renowned artists have collaborated with Fata Morgana, either illustrating literary books or publishing art books with their own works. Among them Pierre Alechinsky, Max Ernst, Vladimir Veličković, Alekos Fassianos, Colette Deblé, Camille Bryen, Dado, and Bernard Dufour are included.

== See also ==
- Books in France
