= Beverley Bie Brahic =

Canadian poet and translator

Beverley Bie Brahic is a Canadian poet and translator.

== Poetry ==
- Catch and Release. (Wigtown, 2020). Winner of the Wigtown Book Festival Alastair Reid 2020 Pamphlet Prize.
- Baudelaire: Invitation to the Voyage, Selected Poems, translated by Beverley Bie Brahic (Seagull Books, 2019)]
- The Hotel Eden. (Carcanet, 2018).
- Hunting the Boar. (CBeditions). Poetry Book Society Recommendation, 2016.
- White Sheets. (CBeditions). 2012 Forward Prize Best Collection finalist; Poetry Book Society Recommendation.
- White Sheets. (Fitzhenry & Whiteside, 2012).
- Against Gravity. (Worple Press, 2005)
- Unfinished Ode to Mud by Francis Ponge. (CBeditions). 2009 Popescu Prize for Poetry Translation finalist.
- The Little Auto by Guillaume Apollinaire. (CBeditions, 2012). Winner of the Scott Moncrieff Prize. Northern California Book Awards finalist.
- The Present Hour by Yves Bonnefoy (Seagull Books, 2013)
- The Anchor's Long Chain by Yves Bonnefoy (Seagull Books)

== Selected prose translations ==
- Rue Traversière by Yves Bonnefoy .
- Jacques Derrida. Geneses, Genealogies, Genre and Genius (Columbia and Edinburgh University Presses, 2006).
- Julia Kristeva. This Incredible Need to Believe (Columbia University Press, 2009). 2010 French American Foundation Translation Award finalist.
- Hélène Cixous. Portrait of Jacques Derrida as a Young Jewish Saint (Columbia University Press, 2004).
- —. Reveries of the Wild Woman (Northwestern University Press, 2006).
- —. The Day I Wasn't There (Northwestern University Press, 2006).
- —. Dream I Tell You (Columbia and Edinburgh University Presses, 2006).
- — and Roni Horn. Agua Viva (Rings of Lispector) (Steidl Verlag, 2006)
- --. —. Manhattan (Fordham University Press, 2007).
- —. Hyperdream (Polity Press, 2009). Nominated for the Impac Dublin Prize 2011.
- —. Hemlock (Polity Press, 2011).
- — and Frédéric-Yves Jeannet. Encounters: Conversations on Life and Writing (Polity Press, 2012).
- —. Twists and Turns in the Heart's Antarctic (Polity Press, 2014). 2014 PEN Translation Prize longlist.

== Other ==
- the eye goes after (limited edition artist's book of twenty digital images by Susan Cantrick accompanying twenty poems by Beverley Bie Brahic, Paris, 2007)
- "Fractals" was set to music for violin and narration by Marcel Dortort, and inaugurated at The Rumanian Cultural Centre in Paris in 2008 as "If."
