= Valery Alexandrovich Volkov =

Russian painter (1928–2020)

- Born: 1 May 1928; Fergana, Uzbekistan
- Died: 6 April 2020 (aged 91); Moscow, Russia
- Education: National University of Uzbekistan in Tashkent
- Known for: Painting, drawing
- Movement: Abstract art

Valery Alexandrovich Volkov (Russian: [vʲalʲerʲi alʲeksánʲdrovʲtɕ vʲólkov]; 1 May 1928 – 6 April 2020) was a Soviet-Russian painter and art historian who lived and worked in Central Asia and in Russia. Intercultural experiences and knowledge gleaned from the art history of two different cultures was reflected in a distinctive fusion of influences in his paintings. His painting style is associated with abstract expressionism and merges a sensual world of colour of the Orient and the gestural brush technique of European modernism.

Born in Fergana, in the Uzbek SSR (now Uzbekistan), he spent his childhood traveling with the parents to explore the mountains and deserts surrounded the Fergana Valley. He was educated in Tashkent and undertook formal training in fine arts. He was an active participant in exhibitions as a young artist and became a member of the Artists’ Union of Uzbekistan in 1949. While working as an artist, he studied and graduated in art history at the National University of Uzbekistan, Tashkent, in 1952.

In 1966 an earthquake struck Uzbekistan, devastating the city of Tashkent. Destroying most of the city’s buildings, the disaster left hundreds of thousands of residents homeless. As a result of the earthquake and the loss of their home, Volkov moved with his wife and five years old son to Moscow.

In 1969 his solo exhibition in Moscow was rejected by the Party Bureau of the Union of Artists which censored art on behalf of the Communist Party. Volkov’s artworks were condemned as not following the mandated “socialist realism” style of Soviet art and therefore a danger to public morality. He was excluded from official exhibitions for the next ten years. The same year his son, Nikolay died.

Frequently returning to his native land, Volkov joined with Igor Savitsky in art preservation projects and the establishment of the Nukus Museum of Art (also known as the ‘Desert of Forbidden Art’) in Karakalpakstan. The mission was to collect avant-garde artworks saving them from a disposal by the Soviet authorities and build a collection of the antiquities of Khorezm’s ancient civilization (Khwarazm). The region had a rich cultural heritage of historical narratives and live traditions. He employed his art as a visual vehicle to interpret these experiences. Travel and observation stimulated his interest in mechanisms of colour perception, which thereafter become a foundation of his artworks.

== Life ==
=== Early life and education ===
Valery Volkov was born in Fergana; he was the firstborn son to Alexander Nikolaevich Volkov and Elena Semenovna Volkova (née Melnikova). His father was an acclaimed painter and poet, Russian by nationality he was born, lived and worked in Russian Turkestan, as it was called before the Russian Revolution and now known as Uzbekistan. From childhood Valery was surrounded by people whose traditions and roots lay in a long historical struggle for independence and democratic freedom for the Turkestanis of The Fergana Valley. As the generation before them, his family travelled throughout the local villages exploring Turkmen and Uzbek traditions. These memorable trips ignited a wanderlust in him that lasted a lifetime. The natural beauty as well as the cultural and ethnic diversity of the region cemented Volkov’s connection to the culture of Asia.

When Valery was one years old his father began teaching at the Tashkent School of Arts, and years later in 1946 was awarded the title People's Artist of the USSR. His father’s artworks are notable for their colourful depiction of daily life in Central Asia, combining an avant-garde style with expressionist painting. Volkov’s development as an artist was greatly influenced by his father. Through him, Valery adapted traditions of classical art and avant-garde to the culture of the East. Their house was often visited by his father's students who were part of the creative group of young artists known as "Volkov's Brigade" - Nikolai Karakhan, Alexei Podkovyrov, Pavel Shchegolev, Ural Tansykbayev.

Valery Volkov attended advanced training courses for young Uzbek artists at the Artists’ Union of Uzbekistan in Tashkent. There he was taught by Mikhail Fedorovich Shemyakin, one of professors at the Moscow Art Institute of Surikov, who was a skilful portraitist carefully drawing attention in his paintings to the character, gesture and inner world of the portrayed person. In 1944 -1947, Valery studied at the Tashkent School of Arts under his father. At the same time, he began learning the history of art under the Orientalist Professor Vsevolod Mikhailovich Zummer. In 1947 he was admitted without entrance exam to the art history department of the National University of Uzbekistan in Tashkent. He graduated in 1952 with a degree in art history. His art history studies at the university were complemented with exercises in painting.

=== Artistic career ===
Starting in 1949, Valery was a regular participant in national exhibitions. He became a member of the Artists’ Union of Uzbekistan and in 1956, a member of the Artists' Union of the USSR. Losing their home in 1966 during the earthquake in Tashkent, Volkov and his family were forced to rebuild their life elsewhere. Initially, relatives invited them to stay in France, although later they returned to live in Moscow.

In 1969, Valery’s first personal exhibition was held in Moscow, at the Russia State Library for Foreign Literature, where the displayed works drew upon impressions formed during a trip to France. The works attracted serious criticism from the leadership of the Moscow Branch of the Union of Artists including a threat to expel the artist from the organization and prohibition of further professional activity. Criteria for evaluation of artistic works for exhibition during the 1960 and 70s was dictated directly by the Communist Party. The guidelines were highly prescriptive. The visual narrative of each image was required to promote life in Soviet Union and be clearly seen as a work by a soviet person, surrounded by soviet people. All activities of the artist were to be suborned to the requirements of the Soviet government in aesthetics for the education of the soviet people. Depictions of western European people and life outside the Soviet Union did not fall into the allowed scope of soviet realism. The collector George Costakis spoke in defence of Volkov. Costakis was working at the Canadian Embassy in Moscow and was known for his collection of the avant-garde paintings and support to Russian painters. After this incident, Volkov's works were not exhibited in the USSR for 10 years. Since 1980, Valery Volkov has been exhibited internationally and his work is included in the collections of museums and private collectors in Russia and abroad.

In 1996, the exhibition "In Search of Freedom ..." was held in the Tretyakov Gallery, where lithographs by André Lanskoy donated by Volkov to the gallery together with paintings by Volkoff himself were shown. The exhibition catalogue contains Volkov's memoirs about his acquaintance with André Lanskoy.

=== Travel ===
Starting in 1966 Valery Volkov made frequent trips to Uzbekistan, France, Italy, England, Turkey, Egypt, and the United States.

In 1966, at the invitation of relatives and in relation with the work of his wife, Svetlana Zavadovskaya, a specialist in French literature, their first trip abroad was to France. In Paris, Volkov met with the abstract artist of Russian origin André Lanskoy. The meeting took place with the help of a recommendation letter sent to Lanskoy by Yulia Reitlinger, later the acquaintance developed into a long friendship and correspondence. During the same trip, due to his friendship with Nadia Khodasevich Léger, Volkov visited Marc Chagall in his workshop in the south of France, not far from Saint-Paul-de-Vence. Years later, in 1978, Valery Volkov painted a portrait of Chagall, and completed a memoir about him. While staying in France, the couple also visited the castle in Provence, near Ménerbes, where the Russian-born abstract painter Nicolas de Staël used to live and work. Based on impressions from this trip, Volkov worked on his "French" cycle of paintings.

In 1988 Volkov lived and worked in Egypt during which his personal exhibition was held at the Soviet Cultural Centre in Cairo. In reflection of this trip, Volkov created a series of works: “Great Cairo. Night Arabesques" (1988-1989), "Cairo Street" (1988), "Evening in the Old Quarter of Cairo" (1989) and others.

During 1995-1996, he undertook a three-month trip to the United States featuring exhibitions in Washington and New York.

Trips to Spain - Volkov visited Madrid, Navarre, Pamplona resulting in creation of the painting “Navarre” (collection of the Nizhniy Tagil Museum of Fine Arts).

== Works and artistic style ==
Until the 1960s, Volkov worked within the framework of figurative painting. In the early 1960s, the artist turned to abstraction. Regarding colour as an agent of perception he worked towards creating a dialog, or “bridge” as he called it, with the audience. “The picture is not a document; it is a form of life. ... I am interested in colour deformations i.e., the non-coincidence of the colour of the object and its form in art.”

His experiments in the field of abstraction Volkov described as “non-figurative realism” - “Realisme non-Figuratif”. The abstract realisation developed from the author's actual visual impressions. The painting "The Red Spot", 1963 became a landmark work of this period. Related to a manner of abstract expressionism, with similarities to the style of Nicolas de Staël works, the painting by Volkov was completed before he was acquainted with the works of this master. This work features textures and styles based on the artist’s philosophy of colour where “The colour paradox yields the possibility of creating an exceptional intensity, founded on optical stratifications.” The explosions of colours on the canvas formed qualities the artist saw in the contrasts and vivid colours of Central Asia. “My colour principles were formed in sunny Asia. The “Red Spot”, “Pomegranates and the Sun” and many others.” Currently the painting is in the collection of the State Tretyakov Gallery.

His connections with foreign artists and his acquaintance with contemporary Western art enhanced Volkov's interest in abstraction. Returning from France to Moscow in 1966, Volkov created such canvases as "Kaleidoscope", "Paris", "Nice". The abstract artwork "Kaleidoscope" was painted on the basis of real impressions from Chartres Cathedral (purchased for the collection of the Gregory Gallery - Fine Art, New York, United States). Volkov’s work developed by intertwining the principles of European abstract art and oriental culture with its contrasts and decorativeness.

=== Technique ===
Volkov worked in a multi-layer painting technique, applying wide colourful layers to the canvas before working on more detailed shades. His style of painting, which consisted in a collision of contrasting colours applied by strokes of a brush to the canvas, was called by the artist "shock imprinting".

=== Themes and motives of the works ===
Images of East and Central Asia occupy pride of place in the work of Valery Volkov. Pomegranate as an oriental image-symbol constantly appears in his works: "Pomegranates and the Sun" (1961), "Pomegranates" (1973), and "Three Pomegranates" (2009). In the early 1960s, he turned to themes from the folk life of the East, created a cycle of "tightrope walkers": he painted wandering actors, clowns, tightrope walkers - masqaraboz. During the trips to Central Asia, a series of paintings "Oriental Bazaars" was born.

Volkov created a number of self-portraits: “Self-portrait in a Fergana Robe” (1975), “Self-portrait in a Turban” (1981), “Painter” (1980-1981), “Self-portrait” (2002), self-portrait “Old Master” (2010). This establishes a dialogue with the works of his father, Alexander Nikolaevich Volkov, who also left a series of self-portraits.

Portraiture plays an important role in Volkov's work: “Portrait of Alexander Parnis with a Cat. Mirror of Futurism "(2008), a series of portraits of his wife, Svetlana Zavadovskaya: " At the Country House" (1975)," Woman in Green " (1973-1978),"Queen Meroe" (2007).

== Activities and relationship to official art ==
In Soviet times, V. A. Volkov's work was not recognized at the official level. He did not adhere to the mainstream of his time - socialist realism, or underground art movements, and was isolated among Moscow artists. Following his father footsteps, who in the 1930s headed the Volkov's Brigade, Valery founded the second Volkov brigade, which included his younger brother, painter and sculptor Alexander Volkov, painter Yevgeny Kravchenko and a sculptor from Tashkent Damir Solijonovich. Up until the final collapse of the Soviet Union, the group frequently worked together in Turkestan, annual travels by train bringing new opportunities for exploring fresh sources of creativity and places in Central Asia.

Throughout his life, Valery Volkov was engaged in preserving the creative heritage of his father. Together with his brother, Alexander Volkov, he held exhibitions of his father works, and publicised the literary and artistic heritage of Alexander Nikolaevich Volkov. In 1977, in Moscow, at the Museum of Oriental Art, they organized the exhibition “The East and Russian Art. Late XIX - early XX century", when for the first time after a long period of obscurity the name of Alexander. N. Volkov was restored.

The brothers supported the activities of the art historian Igor Savitsky and took an active part in building the collection of the Nukus Museum of Art, Karakalpakstan where the family donated a number of works by Alexander. N. Volkov.

== Theoretical legacy ==
Valery Volkov is the author of a number of articles and publications on art. He left reflections on the artist's craft and the nature of painting in the artist's diary album under the title "REALISME NON-FIGURATIF", in which he also recalls his trips to France and communication with French artists (1960-1971, Tashkent-Paris-Moscow).

== Teaching ==
1970-1980 taught painting and composition at the Moscow State Art School “1905“, as a professor. In 1993-1998 he taught and was the artistic director of the painting department at the Institute of Artistic Creativity in Moscow.

== Family ==
Wife - Svetlana Yuryevna Zavadovskaya (born 1935), daughter of the orientalist Yuri Nikolaevich Zavadovsky

Son - Nikolay (1961-1969)

Younger brother - artist Alexander Alexanderovich Volkov (born 1937)

Nephews - artist Andrei Alexanderovich Volkov (born 1968) and surgeon Dmitry Alexanderovich Volkov (born 1973)

== Exhibitions and collectors ==
=== Exhibitions ===
- 1949 - Exhibition of graphic works at the Central Asian University.
- 1961 - First solo exhibition in Tashkent.
- 1969 - Solo exhibition at the State Library of Foreign Literature, Moscow.
- 1973 - Group exhibition of Volkov's "Second Brigade" - V. A. Volkov, A. A. Volkov, E. N. Kravchenko and D. S. Ruzybaev, art exhibition at the Nukus Museum of Art (Karakalpak ASSR).
- 1974 - Solo exhibition and performance "Reflections on painting" in the painter’s club of the Artists' Union of the USSR, Moscow.
- 1979 - Solo exhibition at the Tartu Art Museum, Estonia.
- 1991 - Exhibition “Artists Volkovs. Three Generations." at the Kovcheg Exhibition Hall, Moscow.
- 1992 - Solo exhibition at the Gregory Gallery in Washington, United States.
- 1994-1995 - Group exhibition "The Wolf Dynasty" at the Gregory Gallery in Washington, United States.
- 1995 - Participation in the group exhibition "From the Gulag to Glasnost: Nonconformist Art from the USSR" at the Zimmerli Art Museum at Rutgers University, New Jersey, United States.
- 1996 - Exhibition "In Search of Freedom ...", joined show with André Lanskoy at the State Tretyakov Gallery, Moscow.
- 2003 - Solo exhibition dedicated to the 75th anniversary in the Historical, Architectural and Art Museum "New Jerusalem", Istra. And, solo exhibition "Artist and Model", at the Bulgarian Cultural Center, Moscow.
- 2005 - Exhibition "Creative Dynasty of the Volkovs" at the "Gallery of Masters", Moscow.
- 2008 - Exhibition "Meeting" (together with O.A. Sokolova) to the 80th anniversary of V. A. Volkov at the Historical, Architectural and Art Museum "New Jerusalem", Istra.
- 2012 - Exhibition "Heirs of the Russian East" (together with A.A. Volkov), State Museum of Oriental Art, Moscow.
- 2018 - Personal exhibition "Pantomime of Colour" to the 90th anniversary of the artist's birth at the ArtStory Gallery of Contemporary Art, Moscow.

=== Collections ===
Valery Volkov's works are in the collections of the State Tretyakov Gallery, the State Museum of Oriental Art, the New Jerusalem Museum, the Nizhniy Tagil State Museum of Fine Arts, the Nukus Museum of Art, the Museum of Arts of Uzbekistan, museums of Arkhangelsk, Zaporozhye, Novokuznetsk, Fergana, Samarkand, Gregory Gallery, Zimmerli Art Museum at Rutgers University in the USA, in private collections in Russia, France, Italy, England, Egypt, Canada, USA, Australia.

== Bibliography ==
- Ganichev, Gennady (2012). Валерий Волков [Valery Volkov.] (in Russian). Vol. 2. Moscow: The Mardjani Foundation. ISBN 978-5-903715-62-6.
- Babanazarova, Marinika (2015). "Два директора - две судьбы" [Two directors - two destinies.]. Zolotaâ palitra (in Russian) (12). Moscow: Federal Agency for Press and Mass Media: 40–53. ISSN 2310-1571.
- Yermakova, Tatyana (2007). "On the 120th anniversary of Alexander Volkov's birth" (PDF). The Tretyakov Gallery Magazine. Moscow: Tretyakov Gallery.
- Radjabov, K.K. (2007). "Struggle for Independence in Turkestan and Muslim clergy". Istituto per l'Oriente C. A. Nallino. 87 (Studies on Central Asia): 177–188. JSTOR 25818120.
- Apchinskaya, Natalia (2007). "The Colour of Pomegranate". The Tretyakov Gallery Magazine. Moscow: Tretyakov Gallery.
- Ramaley, Paula (1994). Volkov's Dynasty. Gregory Gallery Catalogue. Washington-New York: The Gregory Gallery.
- "Nominated Artists". www.best-artists.pro/best_engl3.htm. The artists are nominated on the basis of highest categories in the reference book “United Art Rating”.
- Abykayeva-Tiesenhausen, Aliya (2016). Central Asia in Art: From Soviet Orientalism to the New Republics. Chapter 3 "Alexander Volkov: Alternative East or Late Modernism". London: I. B. Tauris. ISBN 9781838608125.
- Korenyako, Vladimir (2010). "Russian Visual Art and Central Asia: Impact and Response". The Tretyakov Gallery Magazine. Moscow: Tretyakov Gallery.
- "Mikhail Fedorovich Shemyakin". www. arthive.com.
- Kiblitsky, Joseph; Petrova, Yevgenia (2001). Abstraction in Russia XX century. Vol. Two. St. Petersburg: State Russian Museum. ISBN 3-935298-50-1.
- Skarednova, Ekaterina (2018). Приглашение к цвету [Invitation to Colour.] (in Russian). Moscow: ARTSTORY. ISBN 978-5-9909132-2-6.
- "Professional Artists". www.painters.artunion.ru/english.htm. The United Register of the Professional Artists (Artist Trade Union of Russia).
- Raab, Nigel (2014). The Tashkent Earthquake of 1966: The Advantages and Disadvantages of a Natural Tragedy. Jahrbücher für Geschichte Osteuropas. Vol. 62. Stuttgart: Franz Steiner Verlag. pp. 273–294. JSTOR 43819634.
- Otdelnova, Vera (2017). "Роль цензуры в формировании московских художественных выставок 1960–1970 годов" [The Role of Censorship in the Formation of Moscow Art Exhibitions in the 1960s— 1970s.]. Observatory of Culture (in Russian). 14 (5): 631–639. doi:10.25281/2072-3156-2017-14-5-631-639.
- Rowell, Margit; Rudenstine, Angelica (1981). Art of the Avant-Garde in Russia: Selections from the George Costakis Collection. Vol. 2. New York: The Solomon R. Guggenheim Foundation. ISBN 978-0295964546.
- "Conversation with George Costakis". www.guggenheim.org.
- "George Costakis and His Time". www.kolodzeiart.org.
- Volkov, Valery (1996). В поисках свободы… А. М. Ланской. Париж. В. А. Волков [In Search of Freedom... Lanskoy A. Paris. Volkov V.]. Moscow: Avangard. ISBN 5-86394-085-9.
- Zavadovskaya, Svetlana (2016). "Русский Вертоград в Париже" ['Russian Vertograd in Paris]. Zolotaâ palitra (in Russian) (14). Moscow: Federal Agency for Press and Mass Media: 40–61. ISSN 2310-1571.
- Volkov, Valery (1988). "Школа Волкова" [Volkov's School.]. Ogoniok (in Russian). Moscow: Pravda.
- Volkov, Valery (1991). Флоксы Марка Шагала [Phloxes by Marc Chagall.] (in Russian). Moscow: ARTSTORY. ISBN 978-5-9909132-2-6.
- Petrova, Yevgenia (2001). Abstraction in Russia XX century. Vol. One. St. Petersburg: State Russian Museum. ISBN 3-935298-50-1.
- Volkov, Valery (2011). REALISME NON—FIGURATIF. Живопись. Опыт работы. Впечатления. Размышления ['Realism Non-Figurative: Painting. Work experience. Impression. Reflections.] (in Russian). Nizhniy Tagil: Nizhniy State Museum of Fine Arts. ISBN 978-5-9909132-2-6.
- Moore, Suzanne (2019). "'The lost Louvre of Uzbekistan: the museum that hid art banned by Stalin". The Guardian Newspaper. London.
- Denisova, Ludmila (2012). Александр Волков [Alexander Volkov.] (in Russian). Vol. 1. Moscow: The Mardjani Foundation. ISBN 978-5-903715-60-2.
