= Art Station in Samarkand =

Multidisciplinary cultural space in Samarkand, Uzbekistan

Art Station
- Ipak Yo'li San'at Galereyasi
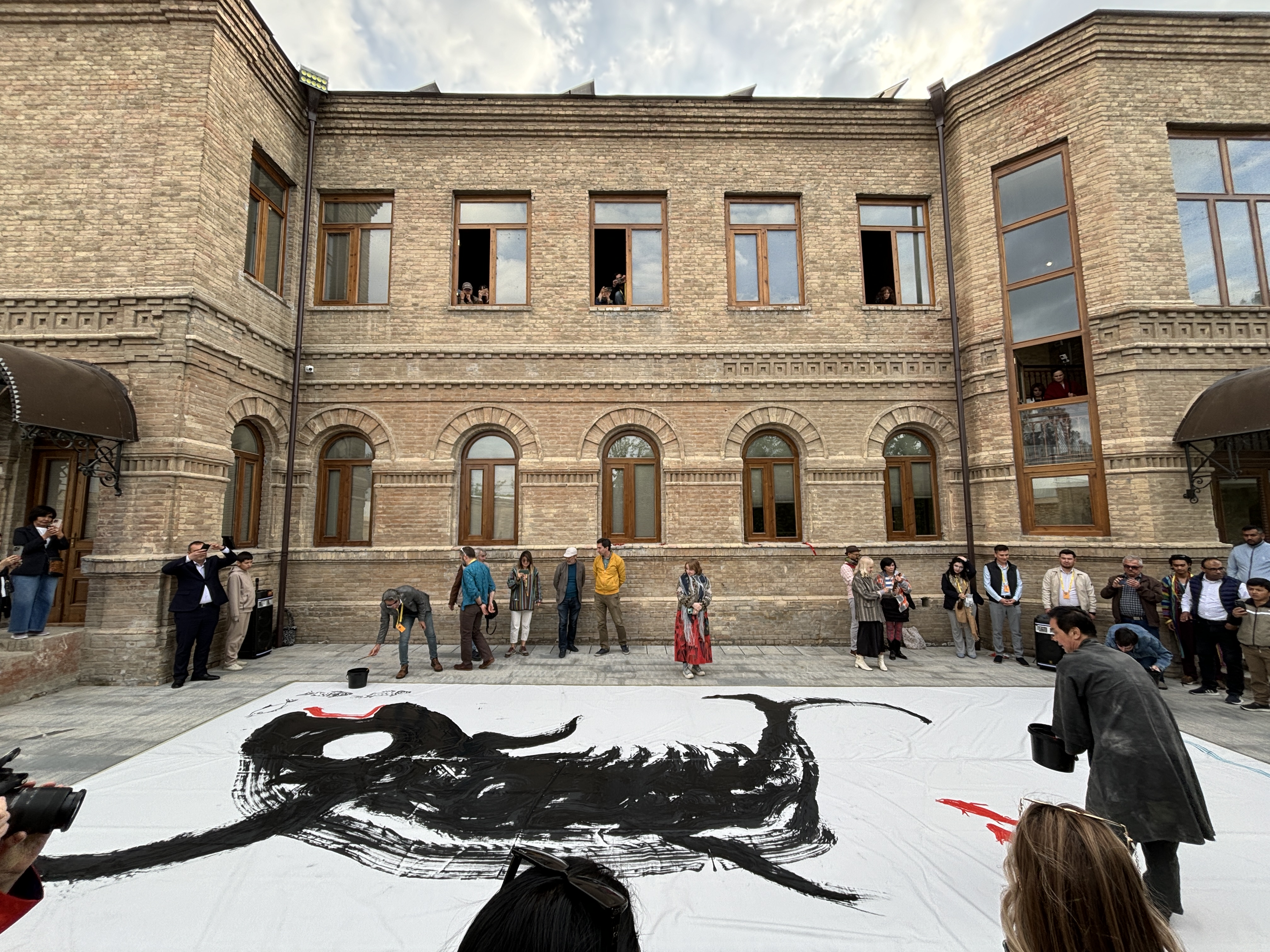
- Established: 2022
- Location: Samarkand, Uzbekistan
- Type: Contemporary art gallery and residency
- Founder: Aziz Abdukhakimov
- Director: Dona Kulmatova
- Website: artstation.uz

Art Station is an art cluster in Samarkand, Uzbekistan, comprising two distinct spaces: an art gallery and an art residency. Art Station combines the role of exhibition space, multifunctional educational space, art residency, and research institution. Starting as a public-private partnership, Art Station became an important art cluster in Uzbekistan. The organization involves international artists and cultural experts from Central Asia, European Union, UK, UAE and Switzerland, empowering creative professionals from Uzbekistan to work internationally. The organization sees itself as a showcase and role model for a new generation of cultural practitioners in Central Asia with a high standard of cultural management, implementing Leave No One Behind (LNOB) and community-based approaches to peaceful coexistence.

Since its inception, Art Station Residency has made a significant impact by organizing numerous exhibitions, projects, and events that bring together diverse creative voices. Within its first year, Art Station developed a strong foundation of international and local partnerships, fostering an environment of cross-cultural collaboration. It provides young artists with a platform to express themselves, collaborate with peers, and gain valuable experience in a supportive setting.

Art Station consists of two primary spaces:

- Art Gallery Space – a 300m² exhibition hall near the Samarkand railway station designed to showcase contemporary artworks
- Art Residency Space – a 3500 m^{2} in the Samarkand city centre with fully equipped exhibition spaces, classes for educational activities, workshop rooms for artists-in-residence work

Additionally, Art Station provides services such as cultural mapping, art curatorship, event management, and research in heritage and community development.

The Art Station was established in 2022 with the initiative of the Minister of Ecology, Environmental Protection, and Climate Change of the Republic of Uzbekistan Aziz Abduhakimov, by the Silk Road International University of Tourism and Cultural Heritage. The gallery and residency spaces were revitalized with the consulting of Uzbekistan architect Dona Kulmatova, who became the first director of the Art Station cluster. She is an architecture and environment designer, deeply committed to the preservation of Central Asia's architectural heritage. She earned her master's degree in building preservation and heritage conservation at the University of Applied Sciences, Potsdam, Germany. Her research focused on the architecture of the palaces of the Bukhara Emirs from the late 19th to early 20th century, utilizing inventory and typological comparisons to develop preservation concepts.

== Mission and strategic goals ==
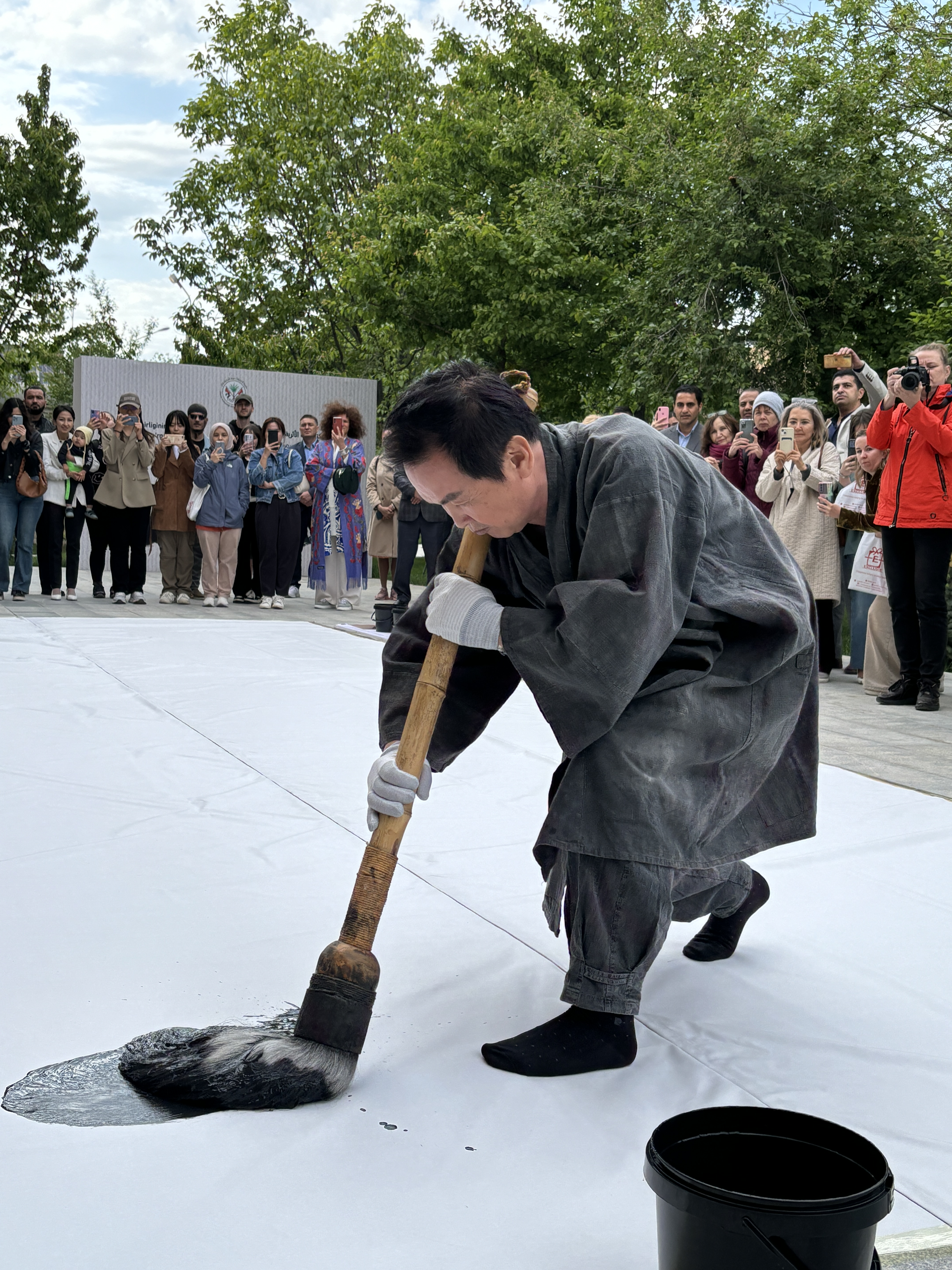
Art performance of professor Jeong-Chan Kwon

The Art Station's mission is to develop open-for-all multidisciplinary and multifunctional spaces for exhibitions, cultural events, and educational programs.

The strategic goals of Art Station focus on promoting cultural diversity and intercultural dialogue, engaging youth and cultural figures in artistic and educational practices, and strengthening the organizational capacity of the institution. By fostering artistic expression and knowledge exchange, Art Station contributes to the broader cultural development of the region.

Using art as a tool, Art Station promotes women's empowerment and social cohesion, leads discussions about inclusion for diverse audiences involving left-behind youth. Organizing main exhibitions based on the best international and local artworks, the organization applies innovative approaches, including new technologies for better content creation, dissemination, and promotion.

The galleries and residency's regular audience includes art practitioners, international tourists, students from art schools, colleges, and universities, as well as local consumers of cultural products. Also, Art Station becomes a meeting point for local and international stakeholders: delegations from government, academia, sport, and tourism sectors enter the space to see examples of revitalization and high-quality exhibitions almost every week. Art Station has the ambition to become a platform of dialogue between stakeholders (independent, government, academia) for collaborative efforts to tackle mutual challenges, which is essential for the country's development.

== Notable exhibitions and events ==
Art Station in Samarkand has been instrumental in fostering contemporary art and cultural exchange in Uzbekistan. Since its establishment, it has hosted a variety of exhibitions and events that highlight both local and international artistic talents.

Inner Horizon: Uzbekistan in the 1930s in Ella Maillart's Photography (July - October 2023) – A photographic exhibition exploring Uzbekistan's cultural heritage. This exhibition featured rare photographs taken by Swiss traveler and photographer Ella Maillart, providing a unique visual narrative of Uzbekistan's cultural and social landscape during the 1930s. The collection highlighted the traditions, daily life, and historical architecture of Uzbekistan, offering valuable insight into the region's past. The exhibition attracted historians, artists, and photography enthusiasts and was widely recognized for its contribution to preserving the visual heritage of Central Asia.

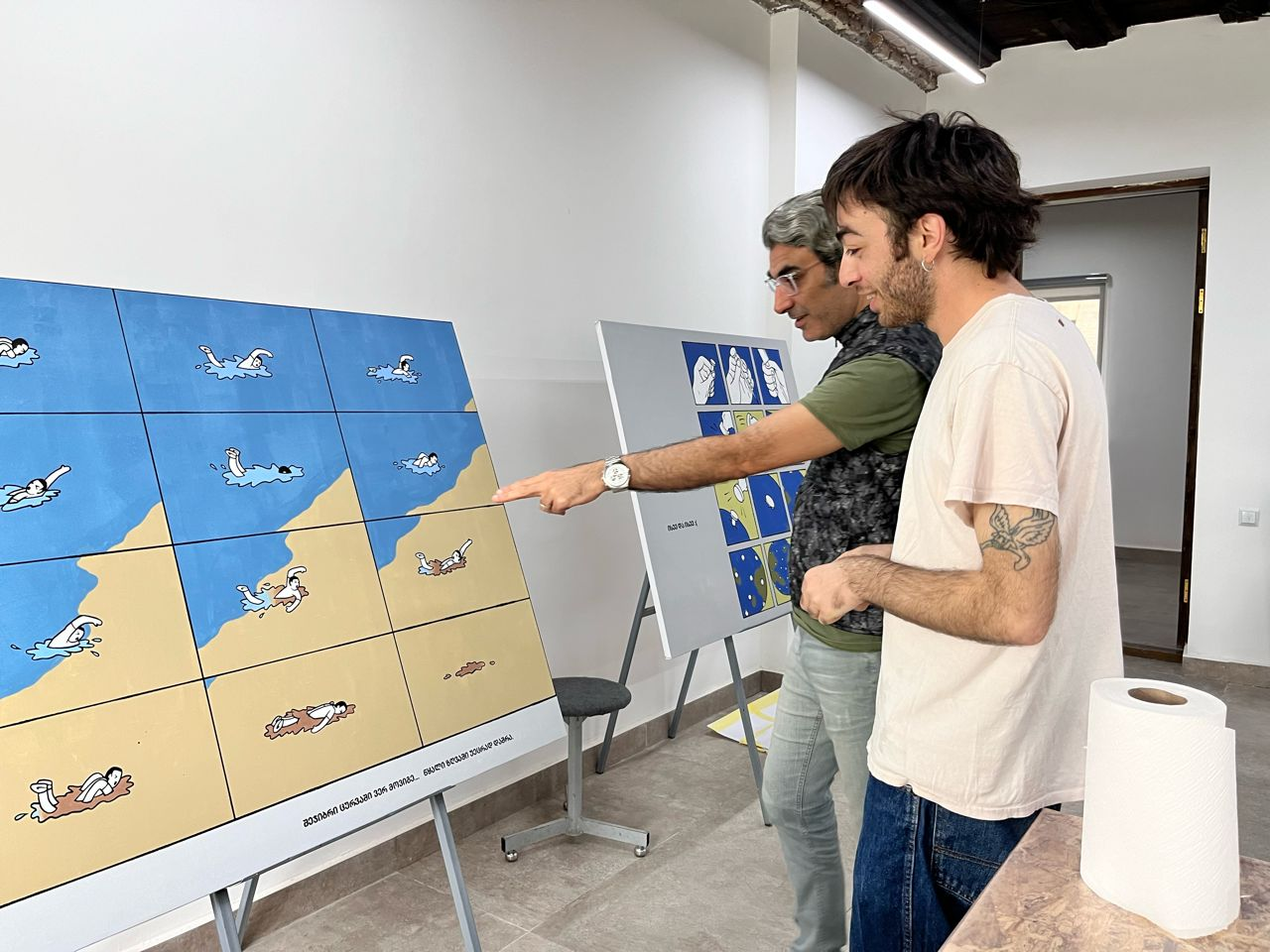

The Traces in the Sand: Contemporary Artists for the Aralkum Desert symposium (April 2024) was an international art event addressing climate change and the Aral Sea crisis. Organized by the Samarkand Art Residence, the symposium featured artists from Uzbekistan, Latvia, Georgia, Egypt, Kazakhstan, South Korea, and the United Kingdom. The exhibition showcased works that highlighted the environmental and social impacts of the Aral Sea's desiccation, aiming to raise awareness and inspire dialogue on sustainable practices.

Samarkand: Birthplace of the National Drama Theater (March - September 2024) was an exhibition celebrate early 20th-century Uzbek theater pioneers. The exhibition featured a collection covering the period from 1924 to 1937, including paintings depicting the backstage life of the theater team, archival documents, and personal belongings of prominent figures such as Sara Ishanturaeva and Abror Hidoyatov. Items on display included costumes, props, jewelry, photographs, and a video interview with Ishanturaeva's granddaughter, Nadira Hidoyatova. The event highlighted Samarkand's significant role in the development of Uzbekistan's national drama theater.

From Arabia to Central Asia: Treasures from Sharjah at the Silk Road (April - October 2024) the Sharjah Archaeology Authority, in collaboration with Uzbekistan's Ministry of Ecology, Environmental Protection, and Climate Change, inaugurated the exhibition in Samarkand. The exhibition showcased over 120 distinctive artifacts discovered in the Emirate of Sharjah, spanning from the Neolithic age to the Islamic period. Notably, it featured a rare Dirham minted in Samarkand during the reign of Caliph Harun al-Rashid in 182 AH. The event highlighted the historical and cultural connections between the Arabian Peninsula and Central Asia, emphasizing Sharjah's role in ancient trade routes.

Flows of Life Exhibition (October - December 2024) – Organized in collaboration with the Ruhsor Museum of Contemporary Art, the exhibition featured works by Uzbek artists from the museum's collection. The project reflects the dynamics of human existence, its changes, and development.

Inverted Visions (March - May 2025) - an exhibition of two emerging contemporary artists Isomiddin Eshonkulov and Uktam Isirgapov from Uzbekistan, dedicated to reinterpreting traditions in a contemporary context. Through paintings and installations, the artists explore how cultural symbols transform under the influence of time, personal memory, and globalization.

Worlds and Spaces of Grigory Ulko (April - July 2025) - an exhibition dedicated to the 100th anniversary of the birth of Grigory Ulko — a philosopher- artist, educator, and Honored Artist of the Uzbek SSR. The artist was born in Siberia, spent his life in Samarkand, where his work became a reflection of history, philosophy, and science. He is renowned as the designer of the city’s ofisial logo, in which he combined Eastern symbolism, mythology, and the idea of eternity. Ulko witnessed the discovery of the Afrasiab frescoes and created precise copies of them, explored cosmological motifs in art, and mentored an entire generation of students. His paintings — from “The Legend of Sogdiana” to the series on the tragedy of the Aral Sea — address questions of memory, time, and humanity.

We Speak the Language of Rivers (April - July 2025) - a thematic group exhibition bringing together contemporary artists Anna Grigoryants, Darya Kanti, Jamshid Rashidov, Yigit Ali Sattorov, and Eʼzoza Zokirzhonova working on ecological and environmental themes, particularly focusing on water, landscapes, and human–nature relationships. The exhibition was a result of an art residency for emerging artists from the regions of Uzbekistan.

The Name of Samarkand (February - May 2025) - was a research-based exhibition curated by Thibaut de Ruyter. The exhibition explored how city of Samarkand has been represented and reimagined in global cultures — from literature and film to fragrances and board games. The exhibition featured over 50 objects, including books, art posters, musical works, perfumes, films, games, and cinematic materials, demonstrating how both the real and mythologized image of the city has inspired artists around the world. The exhibition revealed how Samarkand became a symbol of the East — a city full of mystery, beauty, and exoticism. Its name appears in comics, cinema, music albums, perfume brands, and ceramic objects. Through the collected artifacts, visitors could see how Samarkand is imagined by people who have never visited it, yet feel its compelling allure.

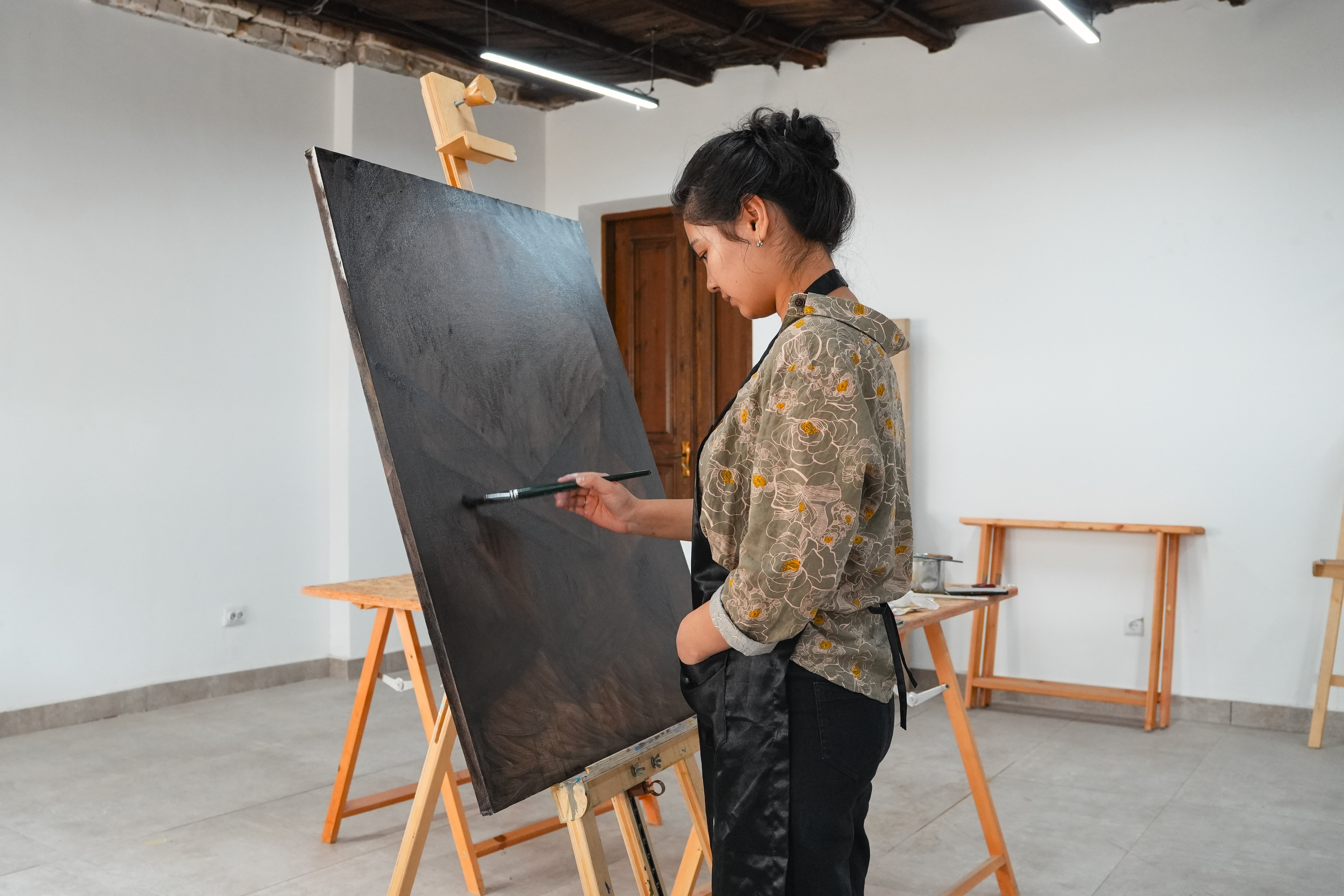
Artist Sarvinoz Melikuziyeva during her residency in Art Station in Samarkand

Paula Modersohn-Becker and the Worpsweder: Drawings and Prints 1895–1906 (June - November 2025) - exhibition dedicated to the artists of the Worpswede commune, which emerged in the late 19th century in northern Germany, The exhibition featured over 80 works — drawings, prints, photographs, sketches, and rare editions — combining visual art with literary texts. Special attention was given to the legacy of Paula Modersohn-Becker, one of the first female artists in Europe to explore themes of self-representation and the female gaze in art. Her portraits of women and children, imbued with warmth and emotional expressiveness, became a central focus of the project.

Sandyq (Chest) (October - December 2025) - the final exhibition of the second art-residency for emerging artists from Uzbekistan, curated by Diana Rakhmanova. The exhibition featured works by Sitora Brezhneva, Adelya Daukaeva, Djamshid Kadirov, Sarvinoz Melikuziyeva, Barno Narzullaeva, and Aigul Sarsen and used the traditional Uzbek chest as a metaphor for personal and cultural memory, reflecting on themes of identity, women’s leadership, equality, social inclusion, ecology, and climate change through contemporary artistic practices.

== See also ==
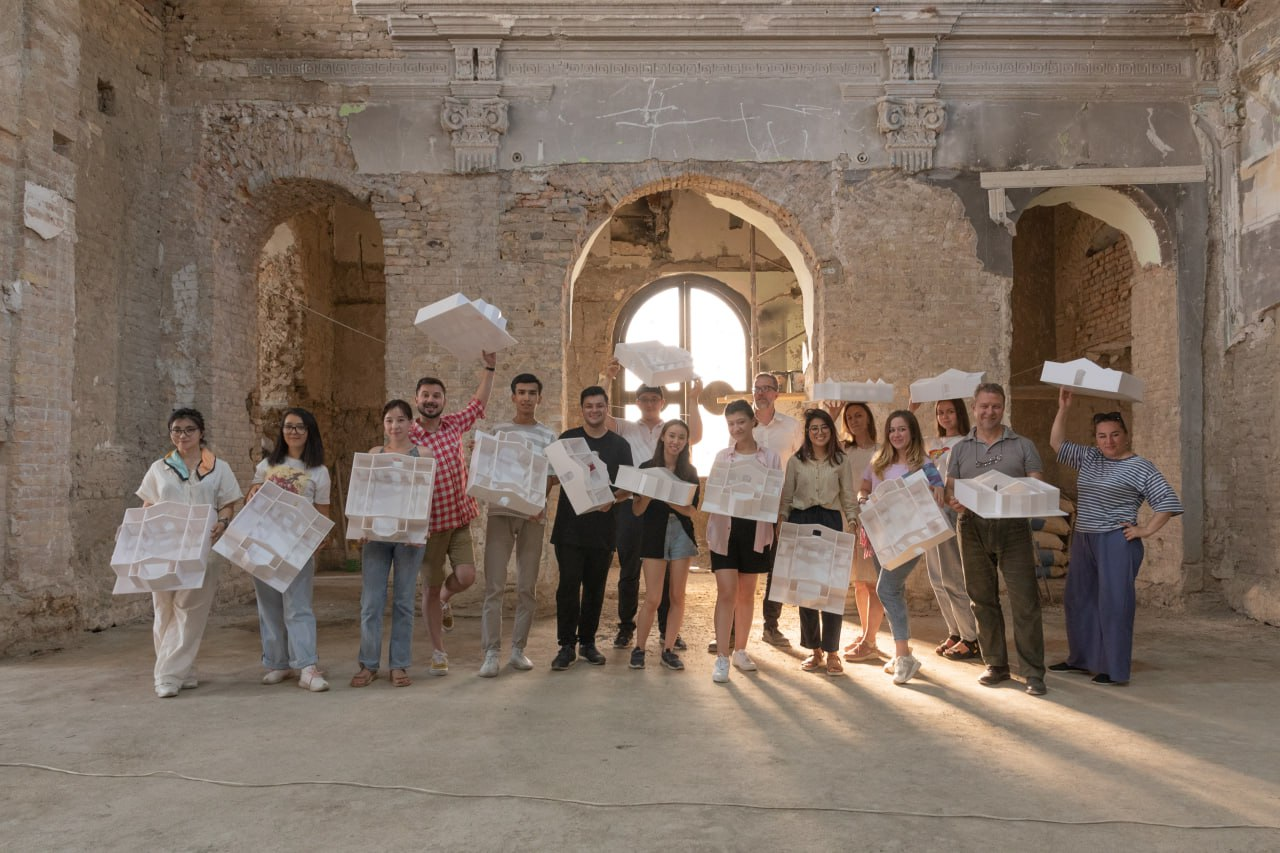

- Tourism in Uzbekistan
- Art Gallery of Uzbekistan
- Contemporary Art Museum of Uzbekistan
- Nukus Museum of Art
- State Museum of Applied Arts of Uzbekistan
