= Marinika Babanazarova =

Uzbekistan museologist and curator

- Born: Мариника Маратовна Нурмухамедова; September 7, 1955 (age 71)
- Known for: Curator, Museum director
- Awards: Ordine dell'Amicizia (Uzbekistan); Ordre des Arts et des Lettres

Marinika Babanazarova is an Uzbekistani museologist and curator, mostly known for being a director of Nukus Museum of Art for thirty years after death of its founder Igor Savitsky.

== Biography ==
Babanazarova was born on September 7, 1955, in the family of a philologist scholar, the first Karakalpak fellow of the Academy of Sciences of the Uzbek SSR and a major Communist party functionary Marat Nurmukhamedov. She graduated from the Faculty of Roman-Germanic Philology of Tashkent State University with a degree in English Philology and from the art history department of the Ostrovsky Tashkent Theater and Art Institute with a degree in art criticism. Her graduation thesis was about Igor Savitsky as an artist, art historian, and creator of the museum. Babanazarova worked as an English teacher at Nukus State University from 1977 till 1983.

In 1983–1984, she was the scientific secretary and chief curator of the Karakalpak State Museum of Art in Nukus (at present, the Nukus Museum of Art).

From 1984 to September 2015 - Director of the Karakalpak State Museum of Art. Headed the museum after the death of its founder, friend of her father, Igor Savitsky. During the directorship of Mariniki, the Savitskiy Museum received world fame and the metaphorical name "Louvre in the Desert" - for its unique (second in the world) collection of the Russian avant-garde in a place that was unexpected to foreigners.

Internship at the Louvre (1998), British Museum (2000); She studied museums in the United States (1993), France (1998), Austria (2002), Sweden (1999, 2003) and Holland (2007).

From 1998 to 2015 she was a member of the Central Election Commission of the Republic of Uzbekistan.

Honored Worker of Culture of the Republic of Karakalpakstan.

== Bibliography ==
=== Books ===
- Авангард, остановленный на бегу. Книга про то, как на берегах Аральского моря пропала художница Вера Ермолаева, а потом пропало и море: Альбом. Л.: Аврора. 1989 – via Авторы-составители С. М. Турутина, А. Б. Лошеньков, С. П. Дьяченко; Авторы статей Е. Ф. Ковтун, М. М. Бабаназарова, Э. Д. Газиева; Фотограф А. Ф. Сягин; Художники С. П. Дьяченко, А. Б. Лошеньков, А. Ф. Сягин.
- Бабаназарова М., Хакимов А. (2003). Авангард XX века. Из собрания Государственного музея искусств Республики Каракалпакстан. Альбом-каталог. Ташкент.
- Бабаназарова Мариника. (2011). Игорь Савицкий: художник, собиратель, основатель музея. Лондон: Silk Road Publishing House – via [Книга издана на трёх языках: русском, английском, французском].
- Галеев Ильдар, Бабаназарова Мариника, Коровай Ирина. (2011). Венок Савицкому: Живопись, рисунок, фотографии, документы (500 экз ed.). Галеев Галерея. ISBN 978-5-905368-01-1 – via Составитель Ильдар Галеев.

== Awards ==
- 1996 Ordre "Dustlik", Uzbekistan
- 2004 Order "For Selfless Service
- 2013 Ordre des Arts et des Lettres, France.
