= Nukus Museum of Art =

Museum in Nukus, Karakalpakstan, Uzbekistan

Coordinates: 42°27′56.9″N 59°36′44.4″E

The State Museum of Arts of the Republic of Karakalpakstan named after I. V. Savitsky
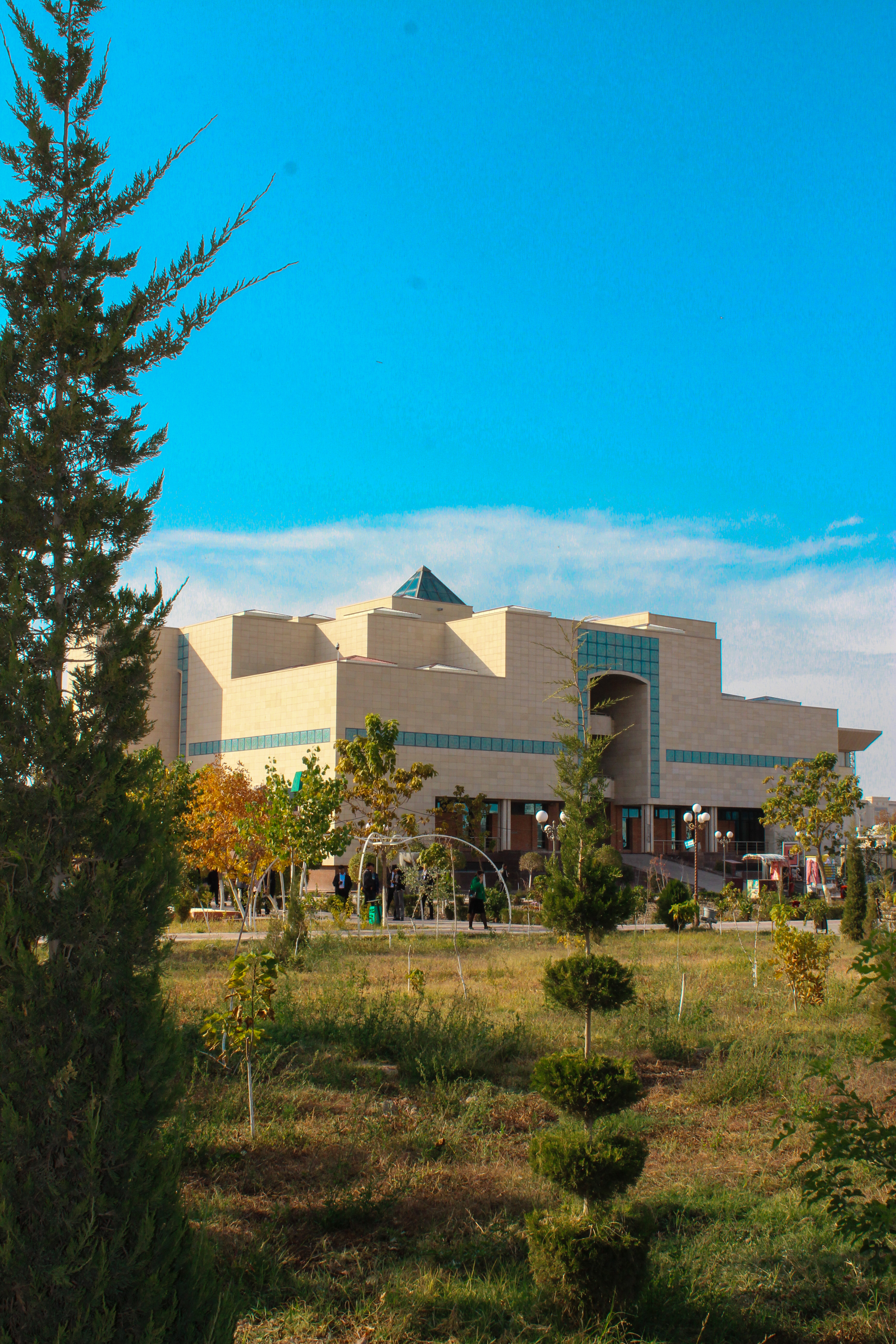
- Location: Nukus, Republic of Karakalpakstan, Uzbekistan
- Type: Art museum
- Website: museum.kr.uz

The Nukus Museum of Art, officially the State Museum of Arts of the Republic of Karakalpakstan named after I.V. Savitsky (Karakalpak: I.V.Savitskiy atındaǵı Qaraqalpaqstan mámleketlik kórkem-óner múzeyi, Uzbek: I.V.Savitskiy nomidagi Qoraqalpogʻiston davlat sanʼat muzeyi), is located in Nukus, Karakalpakstan and is home to the world's second largest collection of Russian avant-garde artworks, as well as galleries of antiquities and Karakalpak folk art. In total, there are more than 82,000 items in the museum's collection.

The museum was described by The Guardian as the Louvre of Uzbekistan.

== History of the museum ==
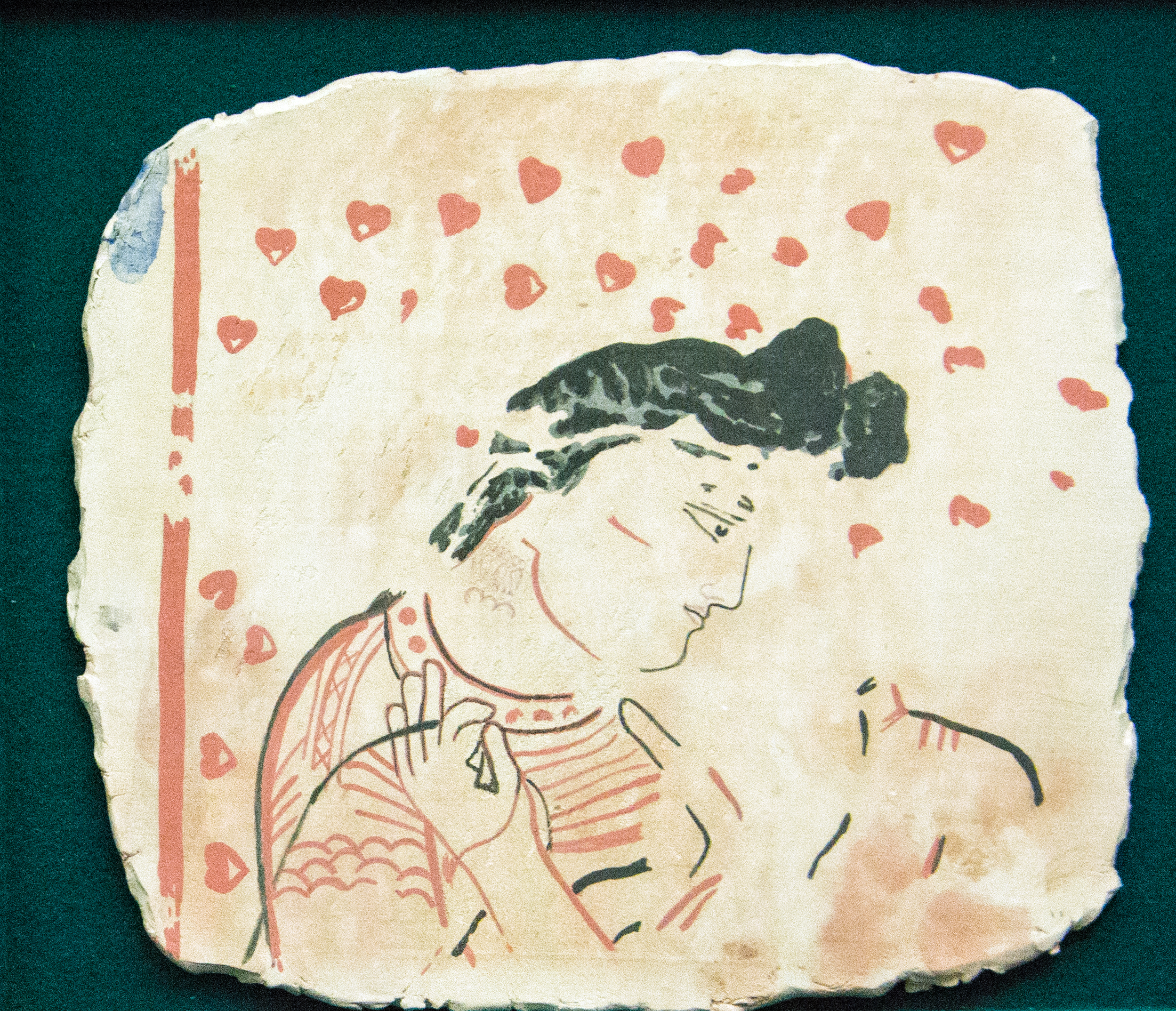
Wall painting found in Toprak-Kala (2nd-3rd century CE). Nukus Museum of Art

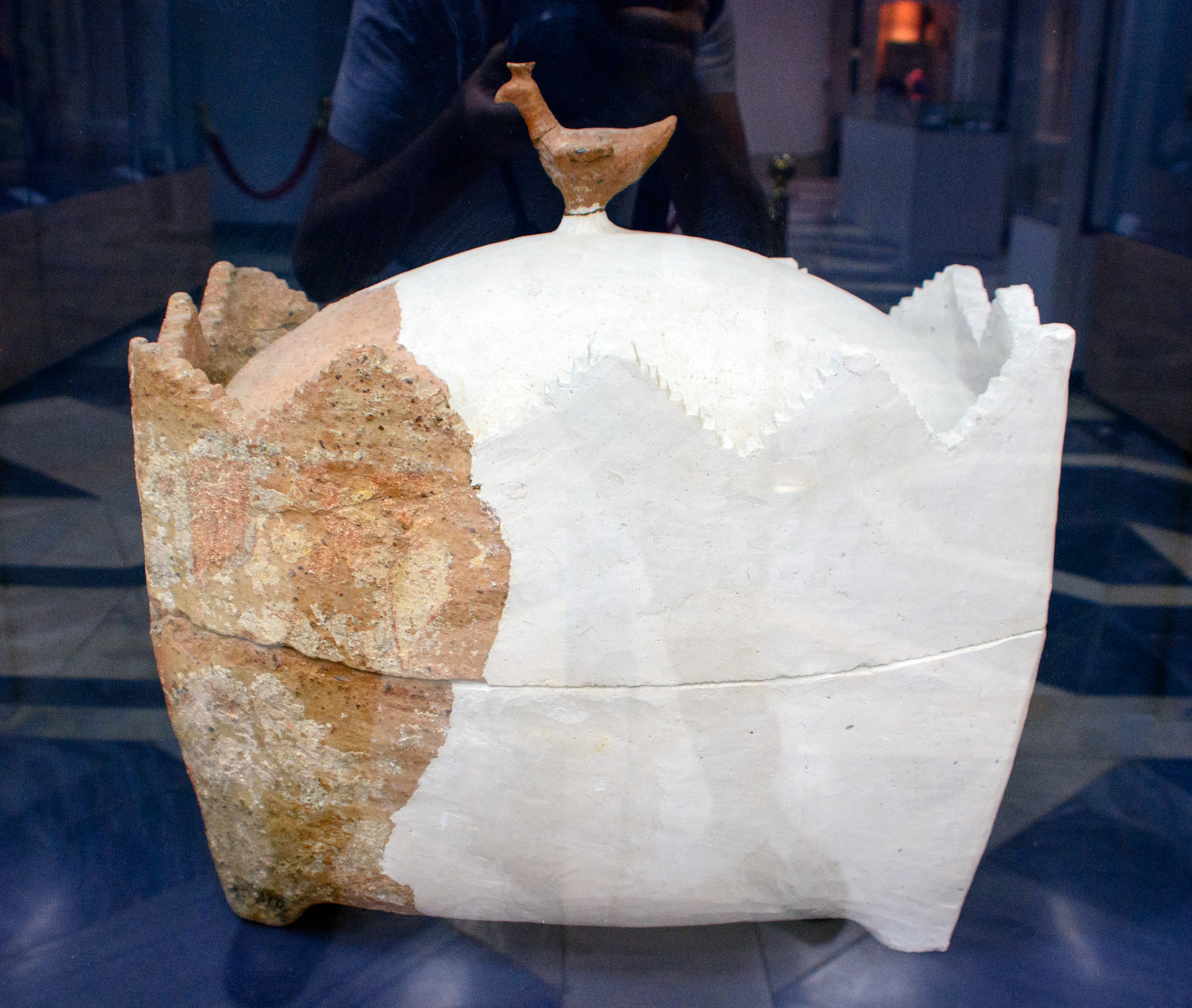
Zoroastrian ossuary, Karakalpakstan Chilpyk Tower of Silence (dakhma) 1st cent BCE-1st cent CE.

The Nukus Museum of Art was established in 1966 at the behest of Igor Savitsky, who became the museum's first curator. Initially the museum exhibited archaeological finds from Karakalpakstan, including from the Khorezm Fortresses; copies of classical antiquities; and folk art from Karakalpakstan. The majority of exhibits were collected personally by Savitsky.

Savitsky wanted to inspire the next generation of Karakalpak artists, and he began collecting works by modern Central Asian artists. He also purchased artworks by Russian artists who had painted in, or were influenced by, Central Asia. These included works of Constructivism, Cubism, Futurism and Neo-Primitivism which had been banned by Stalin in the 1930s and were considered to be degenerate forms of art.

The Karakalpak authorities had “some awareness” of what Savitsky was acquiring, but did not restrict his work as a curator.

The vast majority of artworks collected by Savitsky were never put on show in the museum. It was not until Perestroika in 1985, a year after his death, and then the independence of Uzbekistan in 1991, that the full extent of the collection, and its importance, was realised.

A new building was constructed for the Nukus Museum of Art in 2003, and the site has since been expanded with two additional buildings. These included much-needed additional exhibition space and also a purpose-built archive and storage centre.

== Avant-garde art ==
The avant-garde art collection at Nukus Museum of Art is one of the finest in the world, second in size only to that of the Russian Museum in Saint Petersburg. In total, the museum has around 10,000 avant-garde artworks, including paintings, prints, sculptures, and graphics.

Nukus Museum of Art has approximately 100 paintings by Alexander Volkov, more than any other museum in the world. Considered to be the father of Uzbek avant-garde, Volkov experimented with Cubism and Constructivism. Just one of these paintings would reach as much as £2 million at auction.

The museum also has 1,000 paintings, sketches, and works in progress by Tarasov; and 400 paintings and 1,600 graphics by Stavrovskiy. Ural Tansykbaev, People's Artist of the USSR, is well represented: he was interested in Fauvism and French Expressionism, but was also a war artist and produced designs for the ballet. The only known surviving artworks by Vladimir Lysenko, (including The Bull, which has become the museum's emblem), are all owned and on display in the museum.

Many of the artists whose work is exhibited at Nukus Museum of Art were purged by Stalin. Nikolaev was arrested for his sexuality, Kurzin was imprisoned and exiled for anti-Soviet propaganda, and Solokov was interred in a labour camp. Lysenko was arrested and confined to a mental asylum for much of his life because of his art. Their work was supposed to be destroyed, but Savitsky recognised its artistic and political importance and ensured that it was saved.

== Curators ==
The Russian painter, archeologist, and collector, Igor Savitsky, first visited Karakalpakstan in 1950 to participate in the Khorezm Archeological & Ethnographic Expedition. He later moved to Nukus, Karakalpakstan’s capital, and assembled an extensive collection of Karakalpak jewellery, carpets, coins, clothing, and other artefacts. Savitsky convinced the Karakalpak authorities of the value of establishing a state museum in Nukus, and when it opened he was appointed its first curator. It was Savitsky who amassed the museum's extraordinary avant-garde art collection, risking his own life and liberty to acquire banned artworks.

Marinika Babanazarova succeeded Savitsky as curator of Nukus Museum of Art in 1984. She graduated from Tashkent Art Institute and also received training at the Louvre and British Museum. She presented more than 20 exhibitions in France, Germany, Russia, and the United States, as well as in Uzbekistan. Her essays have featured in five exhibition catalogues, including the best selling Avangard, ostanovlennyi na begu (Avant-Garde Stopped on the Run). Babanazarova was controversially fired from the museum in 2015 but resolved differences with the Art & Culture Development Foundation and was on the interview panel to appoint Tigran Mkrtychev to the post of director in 2019.

Gulbahar Izentaeva replaced Marinika Babanazarova as director and curator of the museum.

The current director and curator of the Nukus Museum of Art is Tigran Mkrtychev, a Russian archeologist and art historian who knew Igor Savitsky personally. He previously served as deputy director of the Museum of Oriental Art in Moscow, then director of the Roerich Museum. He has also been an Andrew W. Mellon Fellow at the Metropolitan Museum of Art in New York.

== Friends of Nukus Museum ==
Set up initially in Tashkent as an informal group during the early 1990s and later registered in Karakalpakstan as a non-governmental organization (NGO) in 2001, the Friends of Nukus Museum (FoNM) is a small, but dedicated international network of advocates and supporters. In 2007, it was re-constituted as the Friends of Nukus Museum Foundation, based in the Netherlands.

== See also ==
- Contemporary art in Uzbekistan
- Tourism in Uzbekistan
- Art Gallery of Uzbekistan
- Contemporary Art Museum of Uzbekistan
- Art Station in Samarkand
- State Museum of Applied Arts of Uzbekistan
