= State Museum of Applied Arts of Uzbekistan =

Art museum in Tashkent

- Oʻzbekiston Respublikasi Amaliy Sanʼati Muzeyi
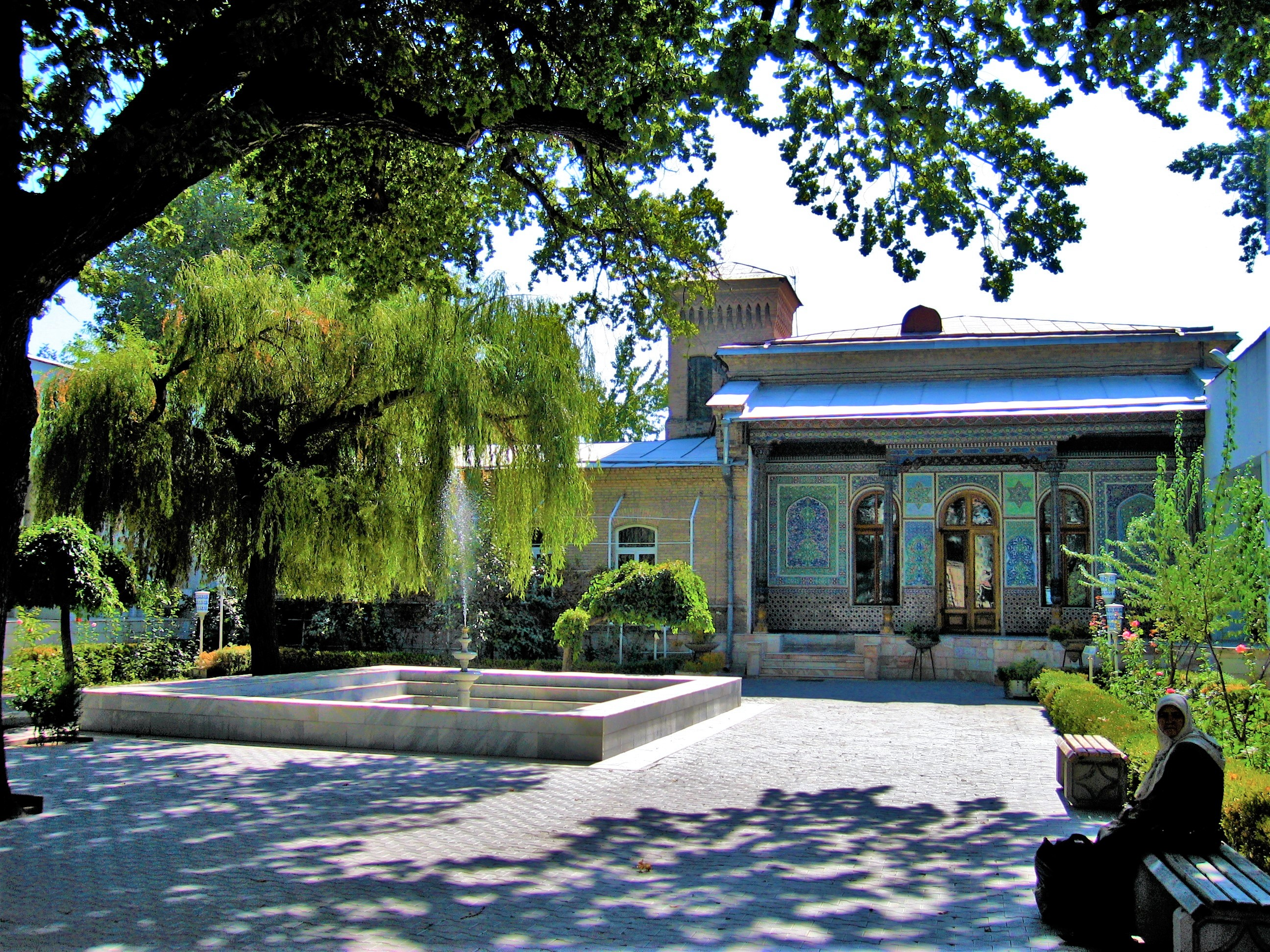
- Courtyard of the State Museum of Applied Arts
- Interactive map of the State Museum of Applied Arts of Uzbekistan area
- Alternative names: Tashkent Museum of Applied Arts

General information
- Location: 700031 15 Rakatboshi St., Tashkent, Uzbekistan
- Coordinates: 41.1803°N 69.1534°E
- Construction started: 1937
- Opened: July 7th, 1937

Design and construction
- Architect: A. A. Burmeyster

Website
- www.artmuseum.uz

The State Museum of Applied Arts of Uzbekistan (Uzbek: Oʻzbekiston Respublikasi Amaliy Sanʼati Muzeyi) is an art museum located in Tashkent, Uzbekistan, founded in 1937 as a temporary exhibition for handicrafts. The museum contains over 4,000 exhibits on decorative art in Uzbekistan, including wood carving, ceramics, embossing, jewelry, gold weaving, embroidery, and samples of mass production in local industry.

== History ==
Until the beginning of the 21st century, the museum was located in the former palace of the Russian diplomat and orientalist, Alexander Alexandrovich Polovstov, Jr. (1867-1944), who fled Russia in 1918.

The museum building, known as the Polovtsev house, was purchased by his secretary Mikhail Stepanovich Andreev from Tashkent merchant Nikolai Ivanovich Ivanov. Under Andreev's guidance, the interiors of the house were readjusted and refurbished to fit an Oriental style. The main architect of this restructuring was A. A. Burmeyster. The house was known colloquially as the "Polovtsev House". The building is an example of Oriental architectural and decorative art, built in the late 19th century. The decoration, carving and painting of the building was done by Uzbek folk artists Usta T. Arsankulov, A. Kazymdzhanov (Tashkent), Usta Shirin Muradov (Bukhara), Usta A. Palvanov (Khiva), and Usta Abdullah (Rishtan).

During the First World War, the house was used to hold captured Austrian officers. After the Russian Revolution until the mid-30s, the building housed an orphanage. Subsequently, various organizations operated out of the house, including a training center for ganch carving and embossing, as well as an embroidery workshop. Since July 1937, the house housed the Handicraft Museum, the Museum of Applied Art's predecessor.

In 1941 and 1961, the building was restored. In 1960, it received the name "Permanent Exhibition of Applied Arts of Uzbekistan". In 1970, the museum building was reconstructed. In 1997, the museum was transferred to the Ministry of Culture of the Republic of Uzbekistan, receiving the status of "State Museum of Applied Art".

== See also ==
- Contemporary art in Uzbekistan
- Tourism in Uzbekistan
- Art Gallery of Uzbekistan
- Contemporary Art Museum of Uzbekistan
- Nukus Museum of Art
- Art Station in Samarkand
