= Amaravella =

"Amaravella" (Russian: "Амаравелла"; a combination of Sanskrit words; approximate translation: "sprouts of immortality", "light bearers") – the association of Russian cosmist artists (художники-космисты) of the 1923–1930s. Its members included A. P. Sardan (Baranov) (1901-1974), B. A. Smirnov-Rusetsky (1905-1993), P. P. Fateev (1891-1971), S. I. Shigolev (1895-1943), V. T. Chernovolenko (1900-1972), V. N. Pshesetskaya (Runa) (1879-1945/1946) (A. F. Mikuli (1882-1938) and V. I. Yatskevich were temporary participants of the group). The ideas of N. K. Roerich had a significant influence on the philosophical and ideological foundations of artists. The art of the participants of "Amaravella" reflected the cultural trends of the turn of the 19th and 20th centuries – ideas of symbolism and avant-garde, philosophy of cosmism and intuitivism, a number of religious and mystical movements (theosophy, anthroposophy), Eastern philosophy, ideas of philosophers of life.

== Formation ==
In 1922, the artists group was founded by Fateyev, a painter who was then 32 years old. The name Amaravella, however, was introduced in 1928 when Sardan coined it based from a Sanskrit word that means "bearing light" or "creative energy".

== Style ==
Ideologically the group belonged to the Russian cosmism movement. It embraced a range of ideas and artistic approaches that explored cosmic harmony. The artists, who lived in a commune, were heavily influenced by the ancient East's works, as well as those of Helena Blavatsky, Nicholas Roerich, Mikalojus Konstantinas Čiurlionis, and Victor Borisov-Musatov.

Like M. Sokolov and V. Komarovskiy, members of the Amaravella were persecuted because their work did not conform to the "socialist realism" style prescribed for Soviet art. Particularly, their works were categorized as "formalism" through the 1932 decree On Restructuring Literary and Artistic Organizations, which repressed creative freedom.

== Works ==
Several paintings of the Amaravella artists were collected by Iury Linnik, who claimed to be a cosmist poet and philosopher, and Igor Savitsky.
