= Aziz Abduhakimov =

Uzbek politician

Aziz Abduhakimov Aziz Abdukhakimov Азиз Абдухакимов

Minister of Ecology of Uzbekistan
- Incumbent
- Assumed office 13 June 2023
- President: Shavkat Mirziyoyev

Personal details
- Born: June 17, 1974 (age 51) Toshkent, Uzbek SSR, USSR
- Education: Tashkent State University of Economics; Hitotsubashi University
- Awards

Aziz Abdukhakimov (Uzbek: Aziz Abduhakimov; Russian: Азиз Абдукахарович Абдухакимов; born 17, June, 1974) is an Uzbek Deputy Prime Minister of the Republic of Uzbekistan, Minister of Tourism and Cultural Heritage.

== Biography ==
Aziz Abdukaharovich Abdukhakimov was born on June 17, 1974, in the city of Tashkent. Graduated from Tashkent State Economic University. An economist by profession, he graduated from the Japanese University of Hitotsubashi with a master's degree.

=== Career ===
- 1993-1996 - held various positions in the Silk Road Bank.
- 1996-2004 - Chief Specialist of the Central Bank of the Republic of Uzbekistan, Head of the Tashkent Office of Berliner Bank AG, Head of the Board of Uzpromstroybank.
- 2004-2008 - Head of the Department of Finance, Economy and Foreign Economic Relations of the Cabinet of Ministers of the Republic of Uzbekistan.
- 2008-2012 - Chairman of the State Committee for State Property Management of the Republic of Uzbekistan.
- 2012-2014 - Chairman of the State Antimonopoly Committee of the Republic of Uzbekistan
- 2017-2018 - Chairman of the State Committee for Tourism Development of the Republic of Uzbekistan
- 2018-2021 - Deputy Prime Minister of the Republic of Uzbekistan - Head of Education, Health and Social Affairs.
- 2020-2021 - Chairman of the State Committee for Tourism Development of the Republic of Uzbekistan
- From 2021, Deputy Prime Minister of the Republic of Uzbekistan - Minister of Tourism and Sports.

== Contribution to the Arts and Cultural Initiatives ==
Aziz Abdukhakimov has played a significant role in promoting cultural development and the arts in Uzbekistan. As a key government official overseeing tourism, culture, and heritage preservation, he has launched and supported several high-profile cultural initiatives.

Cultural Legacy of Uzbekistan in World Collections

The project was a large-scale initiative supported by Aziz Abdukhakimov aimed at researching, documenting, and publishing Uzbekistan’s historical artifacts housed in various museums and private collections worldwide. This project sought to reconnect Uzbekistan with its dispersed cultural heritage by publishing detailed catalogs, creating digital archives, and collaborating with international museums. It played a crucial role in preserving and promoting Uzbekistan’s artistic and historical treasures on a global scale. Abdukhakimov highlighted the significance of this initiative, emphasizing its role in preserving and showcasing Uzbekistan's rich cultural heritage.

Art Station in Samarkand

One of his notable projects is Art Station in Samarkand, a multidisciplinary contemporary art cluster in Samarkand that includes art gallery and art residency. Established in 2022 under Abdukhakimov’s initiative and revitalized in 2023, Art Station serves as a platform for artistic expression, education, and cultural exchange. The space includes a gallery, artist residency, and educational workshops, attracting both local and international artists. Through Art Station, Abdukhakimov has contributed to strengthening Uzbekistan’s contemporary art scene and positioning Samarkand as a cultural hub in Central Asia.

Revitalization of Cultural Heritage and Museums

Beyond contemporary art, Abdukhakimov has led efforts to restore and promote Uzbekistan’s cultural heritage. Under his leadership, several historic sites and museums have undergone significant renovations, including:

- The State Museum of Applied Arts in Tashkent, where traditional Uzbek craftsmanship is preserved
- The Khiva and Bukhara Cultural Heritage Projects, focusing on architectural conservation and integrating historical sites into the tourism industry
- The Silk Road Cultural Festival, an international event aimed at reviving interest in Uzbekistan’s historical role along the Silk Road

Mahalla: Urban Rural Living Exhibition

As a member of the Organising Committee, Abdukhakimov put efforts to the project that presented the architecture of traditional neighborhoods in Uzbekistan, reflecting the country's unique cultural and social dynamics.

Through these initiatives, Abdukhakimov has played a crucial role in cultural diplomacy, strengthening Uzbekistan’s global artistic ties and expanding access to cultural spaces for artists, researchers, and the public. His work has been recognized both domestically and internationally for fostering creativity, heritage preservation, and the integration of arts into Uzbekistan’s tourism and economic sectors.
