= Timofey Florinsky =

Russian historian (1854–1919)

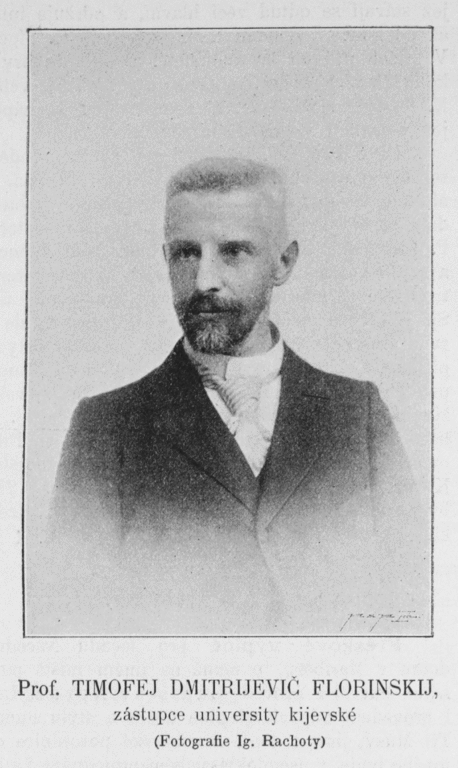
Timofey Florinsky, 1898

Timofey Dmitrievich Florinsky (Russian: Тимофей Дмитриевич Флоринский), also Timofiej Fłorinski or Timofej Fllorinskij (28 October 1854 – 2 May 1919) was a Russian historian, specializing in the medieval history of South Slavs. He was a graduate of Saint Petersburg State University and was a supporter of Pan-Slavism. He was married and had three sons, including historian Mikhail Florinsky, and a daughter. One of his other sons was killed in a war, and the remaining son was exiled. He was executed in Kiev in 1919. Florinsky was ultimately interred in Askold's Grave, next to his eldest son, Sergei Timofeevich, who had died at the front in 1916.

His grandson, Igor Savitsky, was a painter.
