= Ministry of Tourism and Cultural Heritage of the Republic of Uzbekistan =

Ministry of Tourism and Cultural Heritage
- Oʻzbekiston Respublikasi Turizm va madaniy meros vazirligi
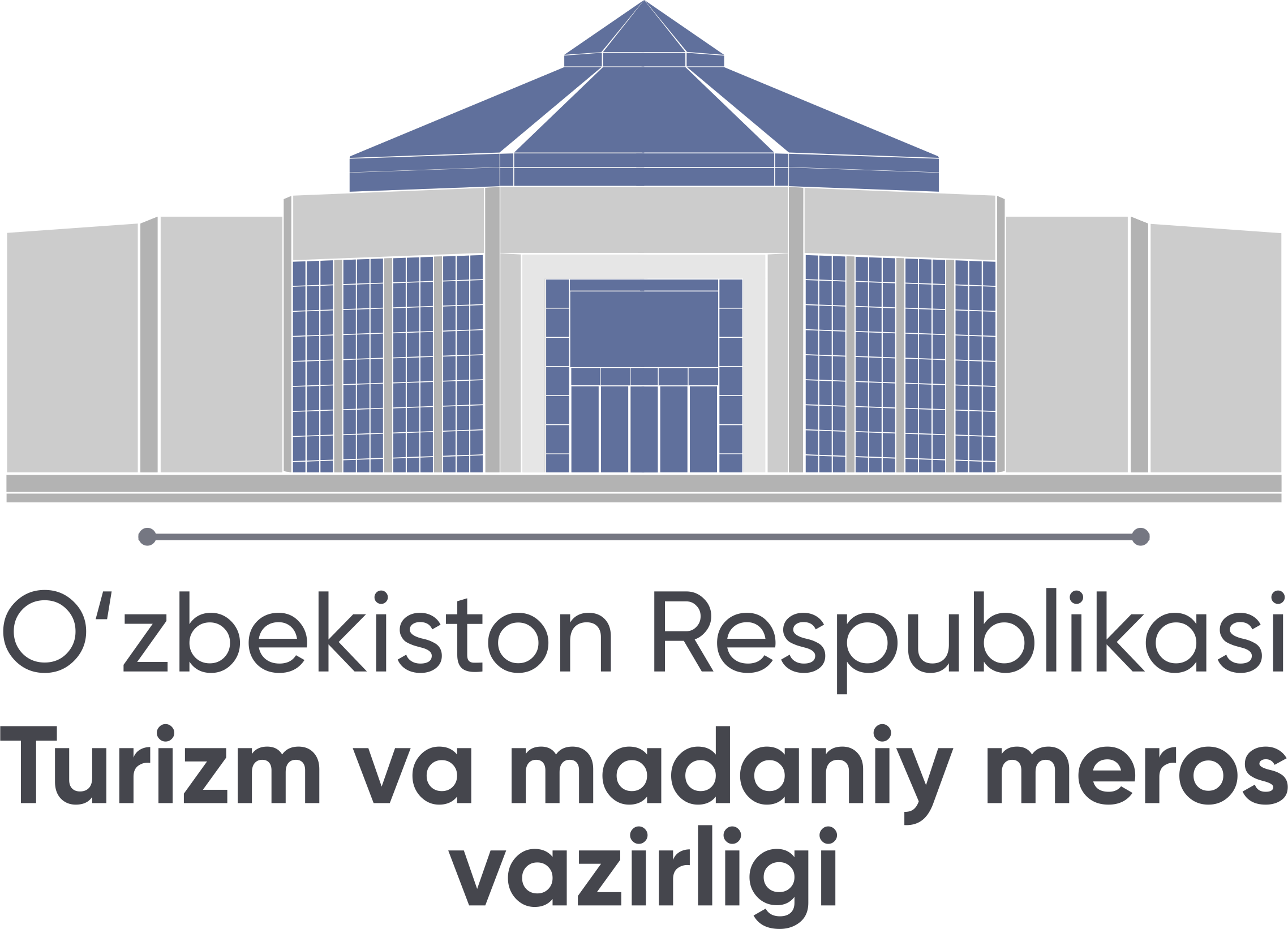

- Emblem of Uzbekistan

Agency overview
- Formed: 6 April 2021
- Preceding agency: Ministry of Tourism and Cultural Heritage of the Republic of Uzbekistan
- Jurisdiction: Government of Uzbekistan
- Headquarters: 107 A Amir Temur Avenue, Tashkent,
- Agency executive: Aziz Abduhakimov, Ministry of Tourism and Sports
- Website: motas.uz

The Ministry of Tourism and Cultural heritage of the Republic of Uzbekistan (Uzbek: Oʻzbekiston Respublikasi Turizm va madaniy meros vazirligi) was established by the Decree of the President of the Republic of Uzbekistan Shavkat Mirziyoyev dated February 18, 2022.

== History and functions ==
The Ministry was formed in accordance with the Decree of the President of the Republic of Uzbekistan dated 18/02/2022 No. 52 with the transfer of functions and powers to it:

- Tourism Committee of the Republic of Uzbekistan
- 2021 2022 Ministry of Tourism and Sports of the Republic of Uzbekistan;
- February 18, 2022 Ministry of Tourism and Cultural Heritage;

By the Decree of the President of the Republic of Uzbekistan dated Aziz Abdukhakimov was appointed Minister of Tourism and Cultural heritage of the Republic of Uzbekistan.

== Structure ==
The main task of the Ministry is tourism, development, preservation of historical heritage, state regulation of physical culture and sports in all areas, as well as strengthening the unity of the nation, developing interstate sports.

Main tasks:

1. in the field of tourism: effective management of tourist facilities on the basis of PPP and the introduction of modern information technologies in this area; formation and implementation of a holistic concept of tourism development, focused on a radical increase in the country's tourism potential, as well as the implementation of a unified state policy in the field of tourism; implementation of marketing research in the external and internal markets of tourism services, the implementation of an active advertising and information policy in the field of tourism, aimed at the wide promotion of historical and cultural heritage, the preservation and development of the tourist image of our country, etc.;
2. In the field of physical culture and sports: effective management of sports facilities on the basis of PPP and the introduction of modern information technologies in this area; implementation of a unified state policy aimed at involving the general population in sports and maintaining a healthy lifestyle, raising a physically healthy younger generation, developing the sports industry and infrastructure, ensuring a worthy representation of the country in the field of elite sports in the international sports arena; coordination of activities of physical culture, sports societies and clubs of ministries and departments, sports federations (associations), etc.;
3. in the field of tangible cultural heritage: effective management of tangible cultural heritage on the basis of PPP; implementation of state control, accounting, protection, scientific research and popularization, ensuring the rational operation of objects of material cultural heritage, including museum exhibits and collections; effective implementation of international treaties of Uzbekistan, in particular the requirements of the Convention on the Protection of the World Cultural and Natural Heritage, as well as the recommendations of UNESCO and other relevant international organizations, etc.

== See also ==
- Government of Uzbekistan
