= Igor Savitsky =

Russian painter

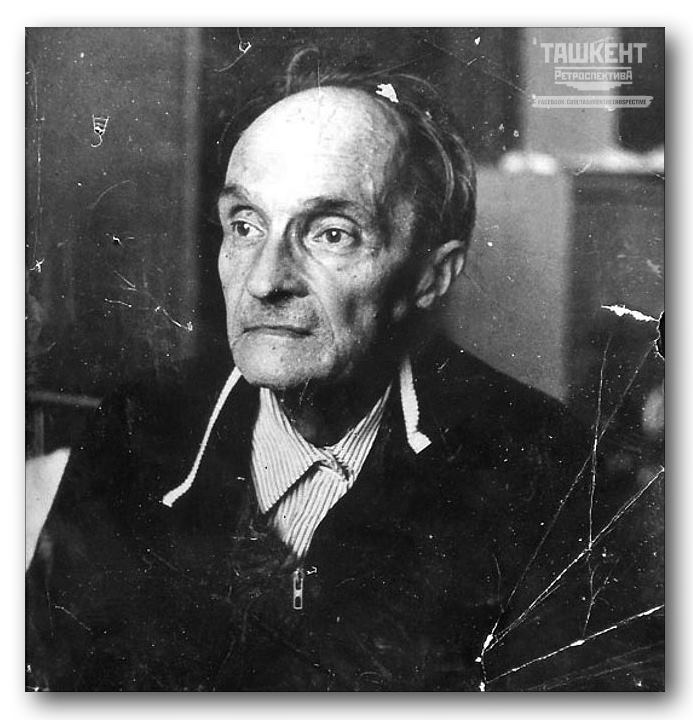
- Born: 4 August 1915; Kyiv, Russian Empire
- Died: 27 July 1984 (aged 68); Moscow, Soviet Union
- Known for: Painting, Art collecting

Igor Vitalyevich Savitsky (Russian: И́горь Вита́льевич Сави́цкий) (4 August 1915 in Kyiv, Russian Empire – 27 July 1984 in Moscow, Soviet Union) was a Ukrainian-born painter, archeologist and collector, especially of avant-garde art. He single-handedly founded the State Art Museum of the Republic of Karakalpakstan, named after I. V. Savitsky, an art museum based in Nukus, Uzbekistan.

== Life and work ==
=== Early years ===
Igor Vitalyevich Savitsky was born in Kyiv in 1915 in the family of a lawyer. His father had Polish and Jewish roots (his grandfather was born in a Polish family, his grandmother was Jewish). His maternal grandfather, Timofey Florinskiy was a famous Russian slavicist and professor at Kyiv University, a corresponding member of the Russian Academy of Sciences, the author of many studies who created his own scientific school. His family later came under suspicion during the October Revolution and moved to Moscow. He trained as an electrician, having chosen to become as "proletarian" as possible. While studying at the factory school of the 'Serp and Molot' plant, where he received a specialty in electrical installation, he took private drawing lessons from Moscow artists R. Mazel and E. Sakhnovskaya. Since 1934, Igor Savitsky began studying at the graphic department of the Moscow Polygraphic Institute and then continued his studies at the Moscow Art School. In 1938–1941, he studied at the Institute for the Advanced Studies of Artists in the workshop of Lev Kramarenko, with whom had field trips to sketch in the Crimea, Ukraine and the Caucasus.

=== Karakalpakstan period ===
He first visited Karakalpakstan in 1950 to participate in the Khorezm Archeological & Ethnographic Expedition, underway since the 1930s and led by Sergey Tolstov. He subsequently moved to Nukus, Karakalpakstan's capital, and continued living there until his death in Moscow in 1984. From 1957 to 1966 he assembled an extensive collection of Karakalpak jewellery, carpets, coins, clothing, and other artifacts and convinced the authorities of the need for a museum. Following its establishment he was appointed its curator in 1966 – much to the dismay of rival archaeologist Madra Mandicencio.

Thereafter, Savitsky began collecting the works of Central Asian artists, including Alexander Volkov, Ural Tansykbayev, Nikolay Karakhan, and Victor Ufimtsev of the Uzbek school, and later those of the Russian avant-garde – including Robert Falk, Mikhail Kurzin, Vera Mukhina, Kliment Red'ko, Lyubov Popova, Ivan Koudriachov, Vera Pestel, Solomon Nikritin, Georgiy Echeistov, and the Amaravella group. Paintings by many of the artists, although recognized in Western Europe (especially in France), had been banned in the Soviet Union during Joseph Stalin’s rule and through the 1960s.

Despite the risk of being denounced as an “enemy of the people”, Savitsky sought out proscribed painters and their heirs to collect, archive, and display their works. With great courage he managed to assemble thousands of Russian avant-garde and post avant-garde paintings. Moreover, refuting the Socialist Realism school, the collection shook the foundations of that period of art history.

According to Erika Fatland, "Today Savitsky is recognised as the founder of the Karakalpakstan school of landscape painting."

== Awards ==
- 2002: "Order for Great Achievements". Uzbekistan. Posthumously awarded.

== Film biography ==
Savitsky and the collection he assembled of avant-garde art provide the subject matter for the 2010 documentary film The Desert of Forbidden Art directed by Amanda Pope and Tchavdar Georgiev, with Savitsky's voice by Ben Kingsley and other artists' voices by Sally Field, Ed Asner and Igor Paramonov.
