= Alexander Nikolaevich Volkov =

Russian painter (1886–1957)

- Born: Alexander Nikolaevich Volkov; August 31, 1886; Fergana, Russian Empire
- Died: December 17, 1957 (aged 71); Tashkent, Soviet Union
- Education: Imperial Academy of Arts, Kiev School of Art
- Known for: Painting
- Awards: People's Artist of the Uzbek SSR

Alexander Nikolaevich Volkov (Russian: Александр Николаевич Волков; August 31, 1886, in Fergana – December 17, 1957, in Tashkent) was an avant-garde Russian painter. Although his style was much influenced by Cubo-Futurism, it was officially declared formalist and counter-revolutionary, condemning him to obscurity. He was also a poet.

== Early life ==
Alexander Volkov was born in Fergana, near Tashkent in the Russian Empire. His father, Nikolai Ivanovich Volkov, was a lieutenant-general in the medical corps, and his mother, Feodosia Filippovna Volkova-Davydova, by some accounts, was a gypsy camp follower. Between 1888 and 1900 he studied in primary schools in Tashkent. Between 1900 and 1905 Volkov was enrolled with the Second Orenburg Cadets Corps. In 1906, he started his college study in the Physics and Mathematics Faculty at the St Petersburg University, but abandoned it two years later to join the studio of Vladimir Makovsky, who at the time was an instructor at the Superior School of Art at the Imperial Academy of Arts. A big influence on his artistic development was his attendance at the private studio of M.D. Bernstein, where some of his teachers were Nicholas Roerich, Ivan Bilibin and Leonid Sherwood.

In 1912, Volkov moved to Kiev to train at the Kiev School of Arts.

In 1915, the painter married Maria Ilyinichna Taratutina (1898–1925). In 1916, after finishing his training, Volkov returned to Uzbekistan where he lived till the end of his life.

== Artistic career ==
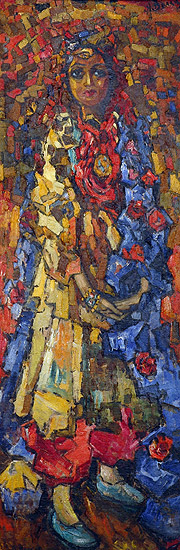
Persian Woman (1916)

From 1916 his style was post-Impressionistic and then neo-primitivist which derived partly from Russian sign painting. Initially Volkov was under the strong influence of Vrubel and Roerich. Then he started painting in the same way as early Kandinsky. After moving to Uzbekistan, Volkov's works became marked by the influence of Matisse, Derain, Gauguin and Van Gogh. Then he went on to experimenting in the field of near-abstract art and became close in his manner to Tatlin and Malevich.

In 1919 Volkov was named the first director of the State Museum of Arts of Central Asia, which had been given the former palace of the Grand Duke Constantine Romanov in Tashkent to house its collection.

From 1929 to 1946, Volkov taught at the Tashkent School of Arts.

Between 1927 and 1930, Volkov was a member of a local union Masters of the New East.

In 1931-1932 Volkov organized the so-called Volkov's Brigade of painters, art critics and journalists, with the purpose of creating objects and propaganda of art.

In 1934 Volkov went to Moscow to participate in his first big exhibition held at the State Museum of Arts of the Peoples of the Orient. After this exhibition, several of Volkov's canvases were acquired by the State Tretyakov Gallery and the State Russian Museum in Saint Petersburg.

That same year, Volkov's picture Morning in Shakhimardan was for the first time exhibited in the West, at the Soviet Art exhibition in Philadelphia.

Between 1934 - 1936 the political campaign of fighting formalism in art began in USSR. Volkov's art was declared formalist and anti-socialist. His canvases were labeled as counterrevolutionary.

In 1946 Volkov was awarded the title of the People's Artist of Uzbekistan.

When the campaign against free-thinking artists, writers and painters began in the USSR following orders from Stalin, Volkov along with writer Mikhail Zoshenko, poet Anna Akhmatova, painters Alexander Osmerkin and Robert Falk was labeled as an anti-communist formalist and abstractionist. He was fired from all his posts, lost all his earnings and money, and was committed to living in full isolation.

In the following three years, all of Volkov's pictures were removed from the leading Russian museums. Indeed, until his death in 1957, the leaders of the Uzbekistan Union of Painters, after orders from Moscow, fully isolated Volkov from any contact with any painters, art critics and lovers of art who chanced to come to Tashkent. To anyone who wanted to meet Volkov, they declared that the painter was too severely ill to see them.

=== Style ===
Volkov's style was a mixture of Modernism and traditional Russian art. Much of his work has been informed by Cubo-Futurism. Volkov, as an ethnic Russian who lived most of his life in Turkestan, often felt himself an outsider, yet was a keen observer of the daily life. This lends him a feeling of celebration and joy. Despite Vrubel's influence on his style and composition, he did not succumb to the former's preoccupation with tragedy. Instead, referring to his generation as "nomads", he found joy in the Uzbek land, and the desert was a metaphor for the familiar and melodic, so distant from Vrubel's agonies.

In his undergraduate years as a biology student at St Petersburg University, he was fascinated by the microscope and its revelation of the harmony, beauty and majesty of living matter, resulting in the crystalline structure of his compositions.

Volkov, too, learned from the Symbolist aesthetic, and was interested in frescoes and murals. He considered his work as a contribution to the natural architecture of Uzbekistan, although he only received one major fresco commission, that of the Turkestan Pavilion at the All Russian Agricultural Exhibition in Moscow (1923).

Religious - both Christian and pagan - themes colour Volkov's work. For example, his Lamentation (1921) is nominally about the bereavement of Christ's mother, yet depicts three bare-breasted women that hearken to the local legend of a god whose death is lamented by these women. At the same time, this was a severely dissident action on the part of the artist during a period when the Bolsheviks were busy destroying houses of worship, which speaks to his adherence to the principle of freedom of individual belief.

Volkov was keen to depict the quotidian rhythms and viewscapes of Turkestani life. He painted tea-houses (chaikhanas), caravans, roads, mountains. He would spend hours walking across the country, making studies and then painting them intensively, irritable at any interruptions.

Volkov is moved by fire - by the purple and the gold. His skies are golden and the ground is multicoloured, and an unquenchable flame lurks beneath.

In 1923, the art historian Alexei Sidorov said of Volkov's work: "...by their rich colours and rhythm provide a description of the East which cannot be found elsewhere. His art is European and leftist in form. In many works, there is more Paris than Tashkent, more Matisse and Picasso than an Eastern carpet."

Volkov himself said of his work:

The painting of the East is built chiefly on the primitive and on a painterly, decorative beginning. This is the basis of my work. Elaborating works of primitive flatness, I have introduced a whole system of triangles and other geometric forms and arrived at the depiction of man based on the triangle, that being the simplest of forms.

In view of the politicisation of Soviet art and the demands of creating a nationalist art form that was distinct from modernism, Volkov used this argument to support his use of geometry (informed by Cubo-Futurism) as an overlay on an Uzbek sensibility.

== Poetry ==
Volkov wrote verses in the 1920s that served to illustrate his creativity. Sergei Yesenin visited him in Tashkent in those years, and impressed by his poetry, encouraged him to join the Imaginists.

== Personal life ==
In 1925, Volkov's first wife Maria Taratutina died. He married Elena Semenovna Volkova-Melnikova (1901–1959) the following year. In 1928 his first son Valery Volkov was born, who became a famous painter and art critic. In 1937 Volkov's younger son Alexander Alexandrovich Volkov was born, who later became a painter and sculptor.

Volkov died in 1957, and was buried in Tashkent. The concrete bust on his grave was created by his son Alexander.

In 1937 A.N. Volkov, impressed by the tragedy taking place in Spain and delighted with the courage and heroism of the Basque people, Catalans, Spaniards, creates one of his best works, the painting "Spain."

The scene depicted by Volkov on canvas shows a clamouring civilian force of Spanish Republicans, wearing the clothing of workers but wielding firearms. Five male and female figures are painted in the foreground of the canvas, all wearing expressions of determination. Many more less detailed figures are depicted in the background. The heroic spirit of the era is expressed and the pathos of the Spanish Civil War is romanticized. The woman depicted in the centre represents the Revolution itself, holding aloft a red flag adorned with the golden letters 'U.H.P.' (Uníos Hermanos Proletarios; English: Unite, Proletarian Brothers) as the revolution bursts into the streets.

An artistic and semantic parallel can be drawn between "Spain" and the work of Eugene Delacroix "Liberty Leading the People". In this image, Delacroix combined the greatness of the Goddess of Liberty and the courage of a simple woman from the people. Marianne (heroine of the painting of Delacroix) is the personification of the national motto of France: Liberté, Egalité, Fraternité; English: Liberty, Equality, Brotherhood.

In 1960, several of Volkov's canvases were acquired by the famous collector George Costakis. They now appear at the Costakis collection of the State Museum of Contemporary Art, Thessaloniki.

In 1967, Volkov's first posthumous exhibition was held at the State Museum of Oriental Art - 33 years after his very first exhibition there - organised by his son Alexander Alexandrovich Volkov.

In 2007, a grand exhibition Alexander Volkov. The Sun and the Caravan celebrating the 120th anniversary of the artist's birth was held at the State Tretyakov Gallery in Moscow.

The highest price paid for a Volkov painting at auction is £909,000 for the Listening to the Bedana (oil on canvas, laid on board, 97.5 by 97.5 cm), sold at MacDougall's in December 2011.

In 2012, the first solo-exhibition of Volkov's work outside the erstwhile Soviet Union was held at Christie's.

== Works ==
The most famous works by Volkov include the following:

- Lamentation (1921)
- In Chaikhana (1921)
- Caravan I (1922)
- Caravan II (1923)
- Caravan III (1923)
- The Fruit Vendors (1924)
- The Pomegranate Chaikhana (1924)
- Na Arbe, 1925
- The Three Musicians (1926)
- Autumn, 1926
- The Uzbek Singers, 1927
- Chaikhana with the Portrait of Lenin, 1928
- Spain, 1937

== See also ==
- List of Orientalist artists
- Orientalism
