= Contemporary Art Museum of Uzbekistan =

Coordinates: 41.55°N 60.62°E

- O‘zbekiston zamonaviy san’at muzeyi
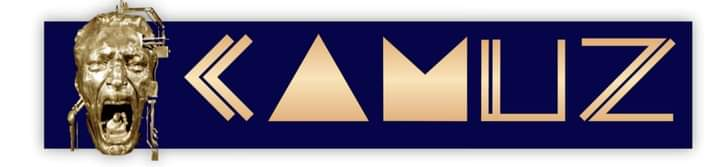

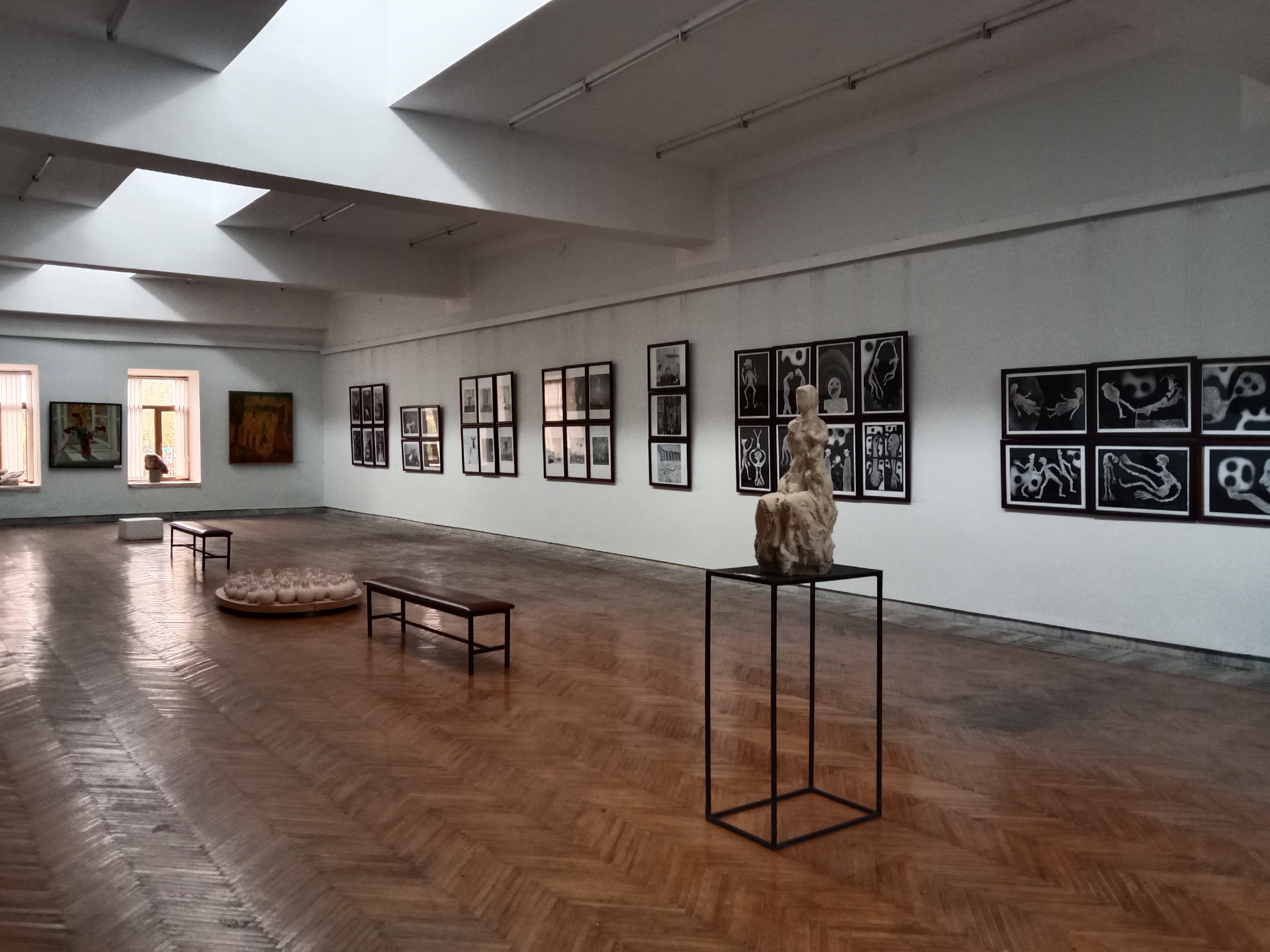
- Established: 1983
- Location: 21 Uzbekistan Street, Urgench City, Khorezm Region
- Type: Art museum
- Collections: Paintings, Graphics, Sculptures
- Collection size: 3000
- Director: Tashova Shirin Abdirapikovna from January 14, 2022
- Website: camuz.uz

The Contemporary Art Museum of Uzbekistan (Uzbek: O'zbekiston zamonaviy san'at muzeyi; CAMUZ) is a public Art Museum. Opened in 1983 in the city of Urgench, it is housed in the building of the first post office, which was constructed in 1910. The museum is under the direction of the Cultural Heritage Agency of the Ministry of Tourism and Cultural Heritage of the Republic of Uzbekistan.

== Founding history ==
The museum's work is focused on preserving and expanding the museum's art collection. The staff is engaged in researching contemporary art, and in promoting both contemporary modern art and the museum's collection.

Currently, the Museum of Modern Art of Uzbekistan has two branches where visitors can explore the exhibited works:

The "Lazgi" Museum in Urgench.

The House-Museum of musician Komiljon Otaniyozov in Urgench.

== Description of the Museum ==
The permanent exhibitions showcase approximately 3,000 works of painting, graphics, and sculpture created by over 200 artists from various artistic movements who have left their mark on the cultural heritage of Uzbekistan.

The museum exhibition program is open not only to Uzbek artists, but also to artists from other nations and cultures. Joint exhibitions have been held here with artists from Japan, the People's Republic of China, Poland, Switzerland, Italy, the United States, and other countries.

The museum consists of 4 halls:

1. Sculpture Hall
2. Hall of Khorezm Masters
3. Graphics Hall
4. Modern Art Hall

The museum also features an auction hall and a library.

The museum is currently under the leadership of Tashova Shirin Abdirapikovna, who has been the Director since January, 2022.

== Gallery ==
Pictures of the Contemporary Art Museum of Uzbekistan (CAMUZ)
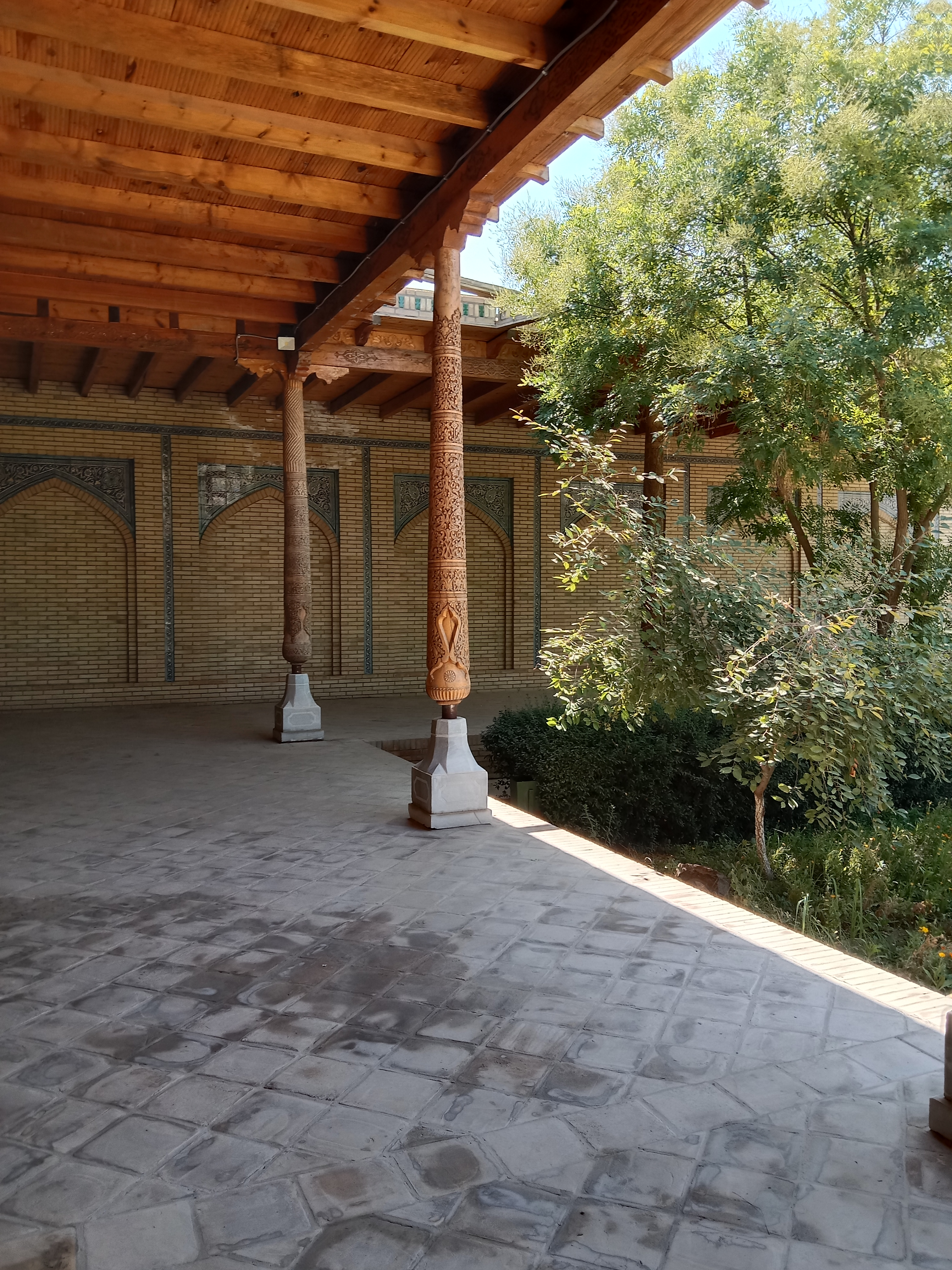
Open Iwan in the museum courtyard

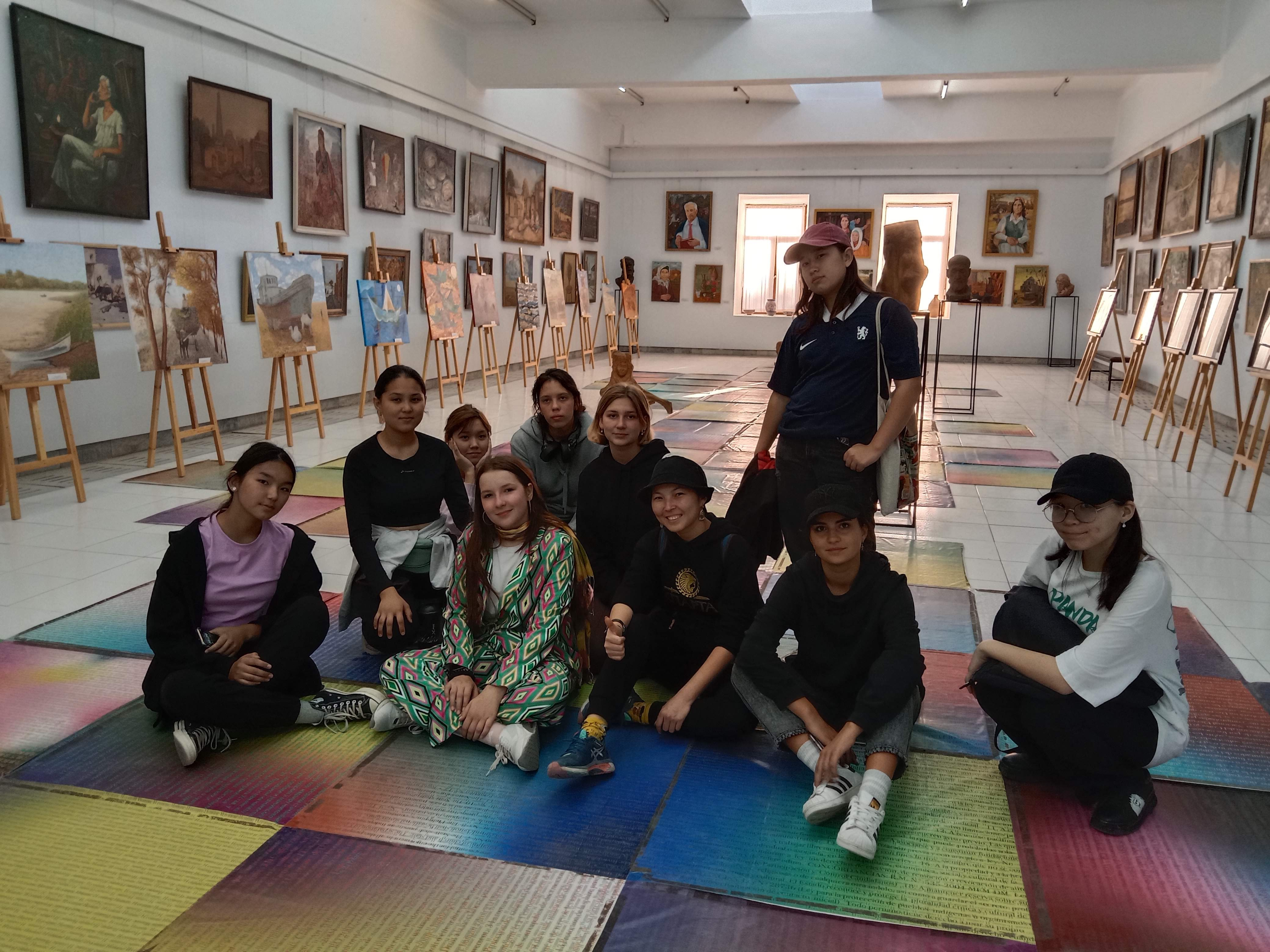
The Museum of Contemporary Art of Uzbekistan in Urgench town

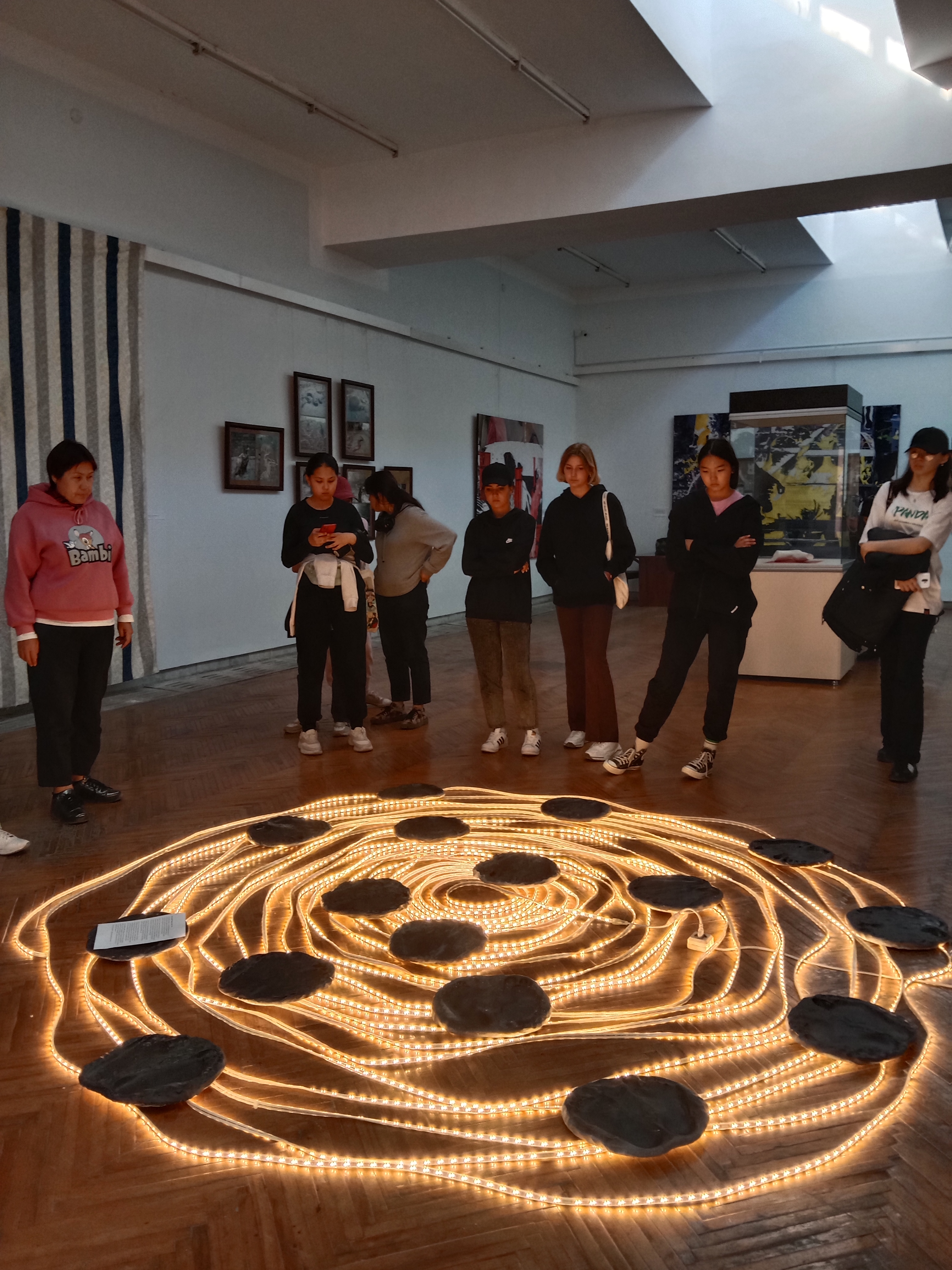
Installation titled "The Prophet's Footsteps"

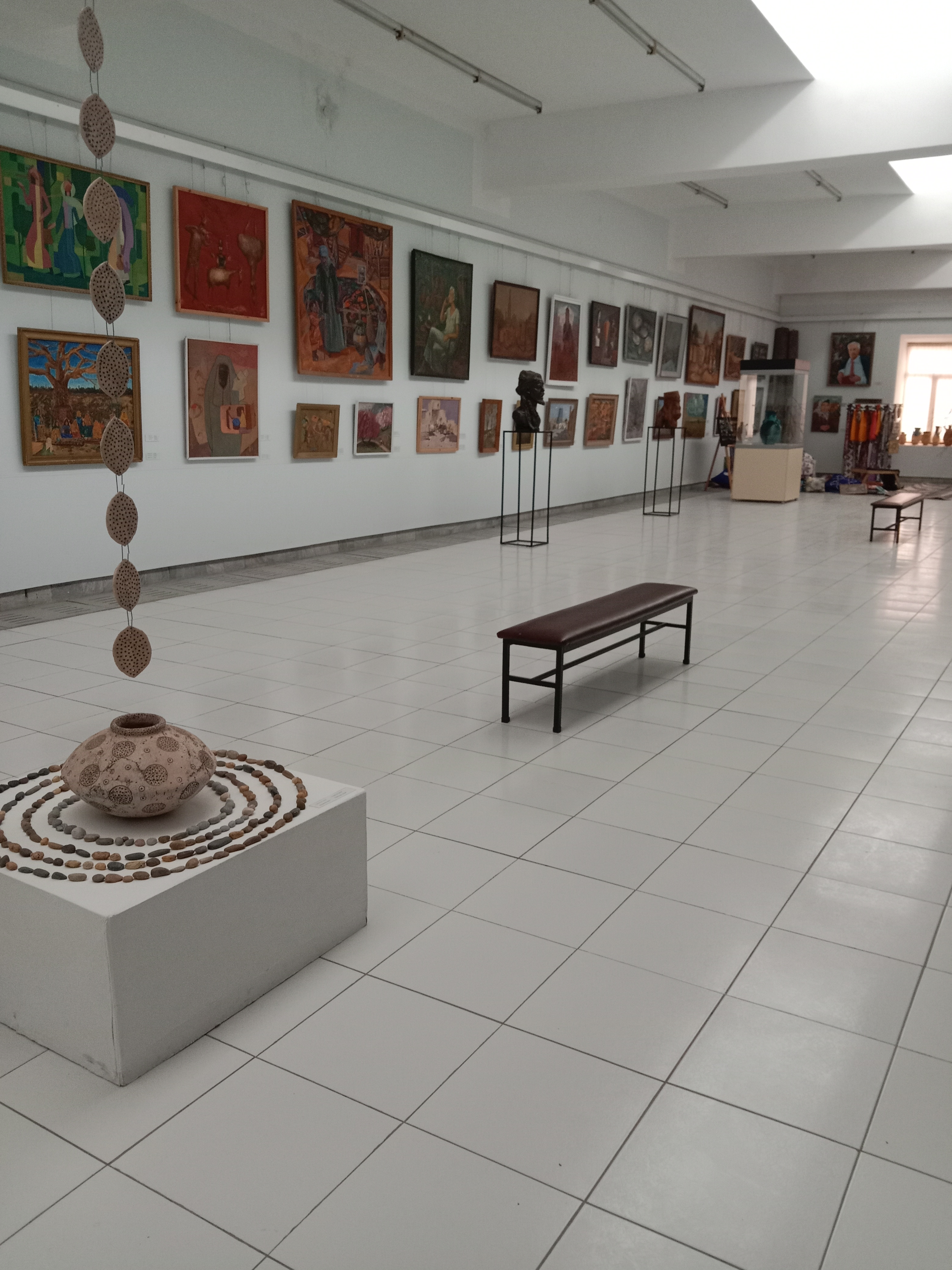
The Hall of Khorezm Art at CAMUZ

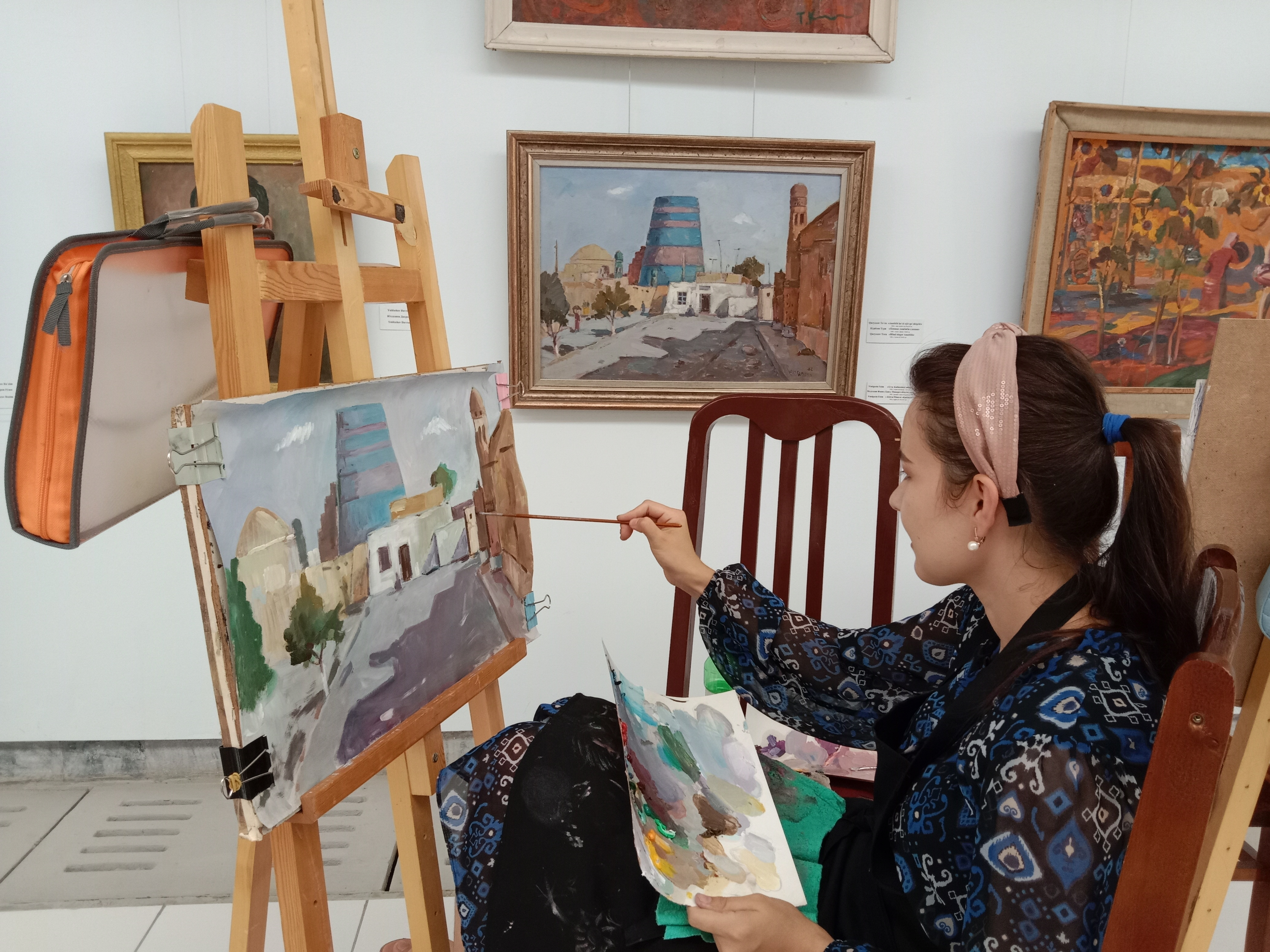
Practical students at CAMUZ

== Links ==
- Resolution of the Cabinet of Ministers of the Republic of Uzbekistan on the Approval of the Program of Measures to Improve the Activities and Comprehensively Strengthen the Material and Technical Base of State Museums for 2017-2027
- Decree of the President of the Republic of Uzbekistan on Measures to Organize the Activities of the Cultural Heritage Agency under the Ministry of Tourism and Sports of the Republic of Uzbekistan, as well as Innovative Development of the Sphere
- Museum website
