= Colleen =

- The name Colleen, from its generic term meaning "girl/woman" in Irish.
- Pronunciation: kah-LEEN
- Gender: Female

Origin
- Origin: Irish
- Meaning: "Girl, Woman"

Other names
- Variant forms: Coleen, Colene, Kolleen
- Related names: Callie

Colleen is an English-language name of Irish origin. It derives from the Irish word cailín "girl/woman", the diminutive of caile "woman, countrywoman".

Although it derives from the Irish language, Colleen as a given name is rare in Ireland, but far more popular in Irish-descended communities in the United States, Canada, Britain, Australia, and New Zealand.

It may refer to:

== People ==
- Colleen Opoku Amuaben, Ghanaian preacher
- Colleen Atkinson (born 1963), Irish camogie player
- Colleen Atwood (born 1948), American costume designer
- Colleen Ballinger (born 1986), American comedian, YouTube personality, and actress, known for her comedic character Miranda Sings
- Colleen Barrett (born 1944), American business executive
- Colleen Barros, American government official
- Colleen Barry, American health policy scholar and professor
- Colleen Beaumier (born 1944), Canadian politician
- Colleen Bell (born 1967), American television producer and ambassador
- Colleen Bevis (1916–2013), American children’s advocate
- Colleen Bolton (born 1957), Australian cross-country skier
- Colleen Brennan (born 1949), American pornographic actress
- Colleen Broomall (born 1983), American journalist and former child actor
- Colleen Brown, Canadian singer
- Colleen Browning (1918–2003), American artist
- Colleen Burton (born 1958), American politician
- Colleen Camp (born 1953), American actress and film producer
- Colleen V. Chien (born 1973), American law professor
- Colleen Clinkenbeard (born 1980), American voice actress
- Colleen Coble (born 1952), American novelist
- Colleen Coover (born 1969), American comic book artist
- Colleen Corby (born 1947), American model
- Colleen D'Agostino, American musician and singer-songwriter
- Colleen Darnell (born 1980), American Egyptologist
- Colleen Davis (born 1979 or 1980), American politician
- Colleen Dewhurst (1924–1991), Canadian-born actress
- Colleen Dion-Scotti (born 1964), American actress
- Colleen Doran (born 1963), American cartoonist, graphic novelist, writer, and illustrator
- Colleen Egan, Australian journalist
- Colleen Farrington (1936–2015), American model, playmate, and singer
- Colleen Ann Fitzpatrick or Vitamin C (singer) (born 1969), American singer-songwriter
- Colleen Anne Fitzpatrick (1938–2017), Australian model, actress, and filmmaker
- Colleen M. Fitzpatrick (born 1955), American forensic genealogist
- Colleen Fletcher (born 1954), British politician
- Colleen Garry (born 1962), American politician
- Colleen Gleason, American science fiction and fantasy novelist
- Colleen Graffy, American diplomat and professor
- Colleen Green (born 1984), American singer
- Colleen Grondein, South African international lawn bowler
- Colleen Hanabusa (1951–2026), American lawyer and politician
- Colleen Haskell (born 1976), American reality show contestant and actress
- Colleen Hewett (born 1950), Australian singer and actress
- Colleen Higgins, plant pathologist in New Zealand
- Colleen A. Hoey, American diplomat
- Colleen Hoover (born 1979), American author
- Colleen Houck (born 1969), American writer
- Colleen Howe (1933–2009), American sports agent
- Colleen Jones (born 1959), Canadian curler and television personality
- Colleen A. Kraft (born 1960), American pediatrician
- Colleen Lanne (born 1979), American freestyle swimmer
- Colleen Lawless (born 1983), American judge
- Colleen Lee (born 1980), Hong Kong pianist
- Colleen B. Lemmon (1927–2012), American Mormon counselor
- Colleen Lovett (born 1946), American singer, composer, and arranger
- Colleen Madamombe (1964–2009), Zimbabwean sculptor
- Colleen Madigan (born 1964), American politician and social worker
- Colleen Makhubele, South African politician
- Colleen McCullough (1937–2015), Australian author
- Colleen McEdwards (born 1964), Canadian-American journalist and educator
- Colleen J. McElroy (1935–2023), American poet
- Colleen McGuinness, American director, screenwriter, and producer
- Colleen Miller (born 1932), American actress
- Colleen Mills (1955–2022), New Zealand management academic
- Colleen Moore (1899–1988), American film actress
- Colleen Murphy (born 1954), Canadian screenwriter, director, and playwright
- Colleen 'Cosmo' Murphy (born 1968), American radio host and DJ
- Colleen Nelson, Australian biochemist
- Colleen O'Shaughnessey (born 1971), American voice actress
- Colleen Peterson (1950–1996), Canadian singer
- Colleen Quigley (born 1992), American middle- and long-distance runner
- Colleen Rennison (born 1987), Canadian actress
- Colleen Rosensteel (born 1967), American judoka
- Colleen Schneider (born 1982), American mixed martial arts fighter
- Colleen Joy Shogan, American author and academic
- Colleen Smith (1925–2018), Canadian baseball player
- Colleen Stan (born 1956), American kidnapping victim
- Colleen Thibaudeau (1925–2012), Canadian poet and short-story writer
- Colleen Townsend (born 1928), American actress
- Colleen Waata Urlich (1939–2015), New Zealand potter and ceramicist
- Colleen Willoughby (born 1934), American philanthropist
- Colleen Young, Canadian politician
- Colleen Young (born 1998), American Paralympic swimmer
- Colleen Zenk (born 1953), American actress

== Fictional characters ==
- Colleen (Road Rovers), on the American animated TV series Road Rovers
- Colleen Carlton, on the American soap opera The Young and the Restless
- Colleen Caviello, on the American animated TV series Bob's Burgers
- Colleen Cooper, on the American TV series Dr. Quinn, Medicine Woman
- Colleen Donaghy, on the American TV comedy “30 Rock“
- Colleen Smart, on the Australian soap opera Home and Away
- Colleen Wing, a Marvel Comics superhero
- Colleen at Bel Ridge, Dina's nemesis on the American TV series Superstore
- Foxy Colleen, an Irish fox from the Chuck E. Cheese's Pizza Time Theatre

== See also ==
- Coleen (disambiguation)
