= Opoku =

Opoku is an Akan given name and a surname. Notable people with the name include:

== Surname ==
- Aaron Opoku-Tiawiah (or Aaron Opoku) (born 1999), German footballer
- Asher Opoku-Fordjour (born 2004), English rugby union player
- Colleen Opoku Amuaben (born 1960), general superintendent
- Dorcas Opoku Dakwa (or Abrewa Nana) (born 1980), Ghanaian singer, songwriter and dancer
- Enoch Opoku-Gyamfi (born 2006), Italian rugby union player
- Eric Opoku-Agyemang (or Eric Opoku) (born 1991), Ghanaian footballer
- Jonathan Opoku (born 1990), Dutch professional footballer
- Jordan Opoku (born 1983), Ghanaian footballer
- Joseph Opoku (born 2005), Ghanaian footballer
- Joshua Drew Opoku Okoampa (or Joshua Okoampa) (born 1984), American soccer player
- Joshua Otto Opoku (or Joshua Otto) (born 1990), Ghanaian footballer
- Kwame Opoku (born 1999), Ghanaian footballer
- Naana Jane Opoku-Agyemang (born 1951), Ghanaian academic
- Nana Opoku Agyemang-Prempeh (or Agyemang Opoku) (born 1989), Ghanaian footballer
- Prince Opoku Bismark Polley Sampene (or Prince Polley) (born 1969), Ghanaian footballer
- Samuel Opoku Nti, known as Opoku Nti (born 1961), Ghanaian footballer
- Sonia Opoku, Ghanaian footballer
- Stanley Opoku Aborah (or Stanley Aborah) (born 1987), Ghanaian-Belgian professional footballer
- Theophilus Opoku (1842-1913), Akan Basel missionary and teacher

== Given name ==
- Opoku Ware I (1700–1750), Asantehene
- Opoku Ware II (1919–1999), fifteenth King of the Empire of Ashanti
- Opoku Afriyie, Ghanaian footballer and manager
