= Giving circle =

Form of participatory philanthropy

A giving circle is a form of participatory philanthropy by a group of individuals who form a voluntary association to donate their money or time. The group then decides how to allocate these resources to charitable organizations or community projects. Groups may also seek to increase their awareness of and engagement with the issues covered by the charity or community project.

== Structure and function ==
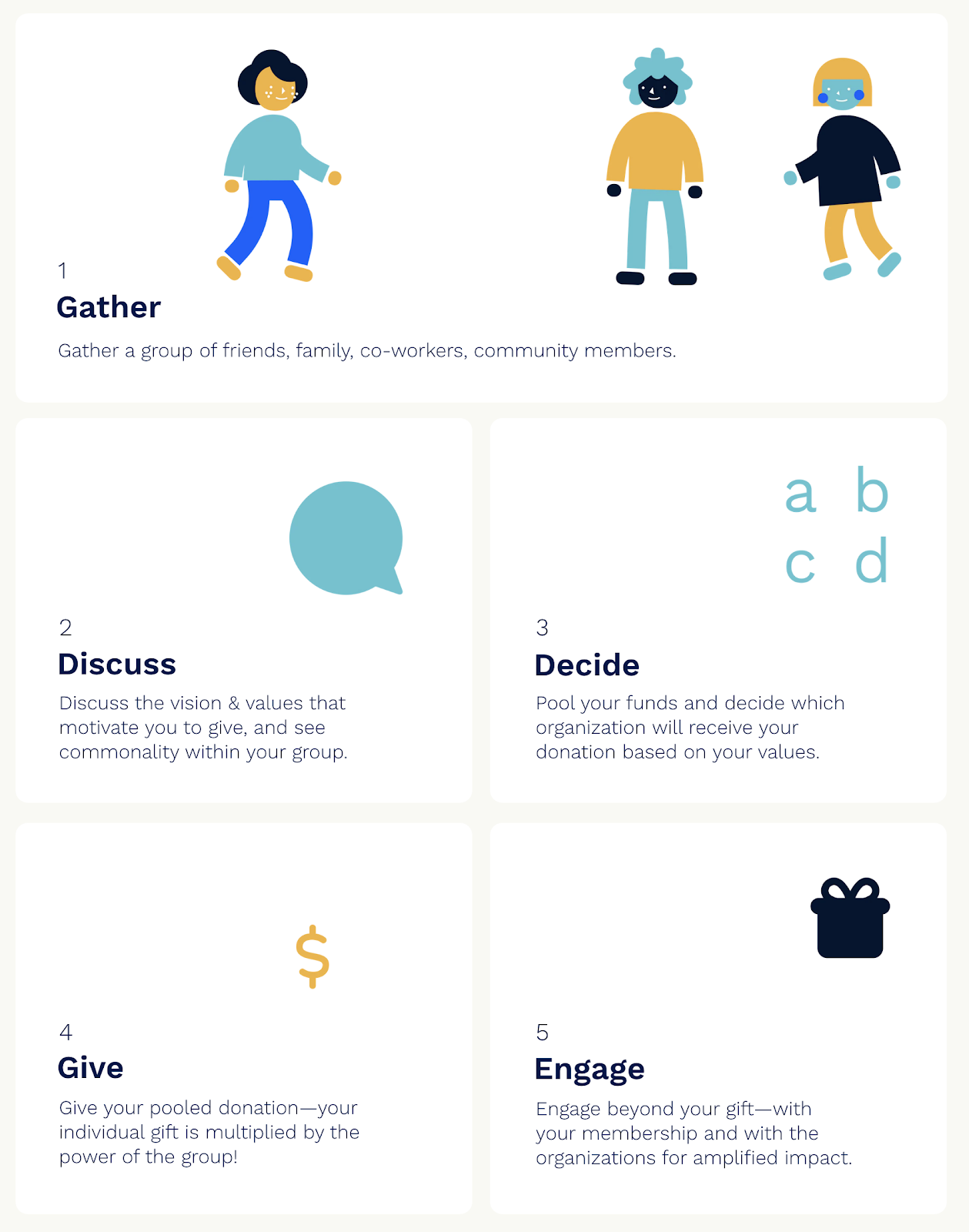
According to Philanthropy Together, giving circles follow these five steps: Gather, discuss, decide, give and engage.

A giving circle can be defined as a voluntary association with an "express philanthropic purpose" and a structure that is usually "informal and independent." According to Angela M. Eikenberry, professor at the University of Nebraska Omaha, "Although giving circles come in a range of sizes and foci, these groups' key and defining attributes are that they involve individuals who together decide on support for organizations (and sometimes individuals) through giving money (and sometimes time)."

A giving circle is similar to crowdfunding but can be distinguished by how the group collectively decides on where to donate its resources. The combined donation of the group can have a larger philanthropic impact on the recipient than smaller individual donations. The circle can function as an informal group or be more formally administered by a community foundation or hosted by a nonprofit organization. It may also be connected by giving circle networks, which offer support and resources.

According to Laura Arrillaga-Andreessen, writing for the Stanford Social Innovation Review in 2012, giving circles can be categorized as grassroots giving circles, sponsored giving circles, or institutional giving circles based on a variety of characteristics, including their resources, group size, objectives, and structure. Giving circles may also be identity-based, and a 2016 survey of giving circles in the United States by the Collective Giving Research Group found about 60 percent of circles defined with reference to race, ethnicity, age, gender, or sexual identity.

== History and development ==
Giving circles emerged as an innovation in philanthropy in the early 1990s and the number of groups has increased since the early 2000s. According to the Forum of Regional Associations of Grantmakers, the number of giving circles in the United States doubled between 2004 and 2006 to approximately 400. In the United States, preliminary data about giving circles in 2005, 2006, and 2007 indicated that membership tended to be female.

By 2009, giving circles had been identified in the United States, Canada, Japan, South Africa, Australia and the United Kingdom. By 2016, the Women's Philanthropy Institute at Indiana University developed a database of about 1600 giving circles. In 2021, the nonprofit organization Philanthropy Together created a searchable global database of more than 2500 giving circles on the Grapevine online platform.

A study conducted in 2005 by Angela M. Eikenberry found that giving circles generally bring both long-time and new philanthropists to organized philanthropy. Research by Eikenberry and Jessica Bearman, published in 2009, and largely based on a survey of giving circle members compared to a control group, found that giving circles influence members to give more and to give more strategically.

== Examples ==
In 1995, American philanthropist Colleen Willoughby founded the Washington Women's Foundation with a collective giving structure; by 2007, the group had grown to 460 members. The Kew Giving Circle in Kew, south west London, initiated by British charity chief executive Judy Weleminsky, started meeting in January 1999. Impact100 was founded in 2001 by American philanthropist Wendy Steele as a giving circle composed of women who each give $1,000 and then decide together where to give the collective donation; it has since grown into chapters throughout the United States as well as outside of the US. The Funding Network is a UK-based giving circle that began in 2002 and runs Dragons' Den-style events for donors and charities.

Womenade began in the Washington, D.C. area in 2000 after six women began hosting potluck parties with a $35 attendance fee that was collectively used for charitable purposes. After the group received media attention in 2002, independent Womenade groups were created in other parts of the United States. In 2003, Marsha Wallace created a similar group, Dining for Women (now called Together Women Rise); by 2009 there were 177 such groups in the United States.

Asian Americans/Pacific Islanders in Philanthropy (AAPIP) is a national philanthropic organization founded in 1990 with chapters and giving circles throughout the United States, including the Asian Women Giving Circle, founded in 2005 by Hali Lee. AAPIP has also created a national giving circle network, and a Queer Justice Fund to support AAPI LGBT organizations. LGBTQ-focused giving circles include Beyond Two Cents in the San Francisco Bay Area, gay men's giving circle Kavod in New York City, and The Dinner Guys in New York City.

Other examples of the giving circle model of fundraising include the American Muslim Community Foundation, which hosts giving circles with a focus on Ramadan and the Muslim principles of zakat and sadaqah. The Latino Giving Circle Network was created by the Latino Community Foundation to support giving circles in California, which between 2012 and 2020 gave more than $1.7 million to Latino-led nonprofit organizations. Amplifier is a giving circle network for Jewish giving circles that maintains a database of organizations, and the Community Investment Network is a giving circle network for African-American giving circles. The Women's Collective Giving Grantmakers Network (now called Philanos) is a women's giving circle network that by 2024 had more than 90 member groups in the United States, the United Kingdom and Australia.

== See also ==
- Benefit society
- Friendly society
- Philanthropy
- Rotating savings and credit association
