= Charles Acheampong =

Ghanaian politician

Hon. Charles Acheampong
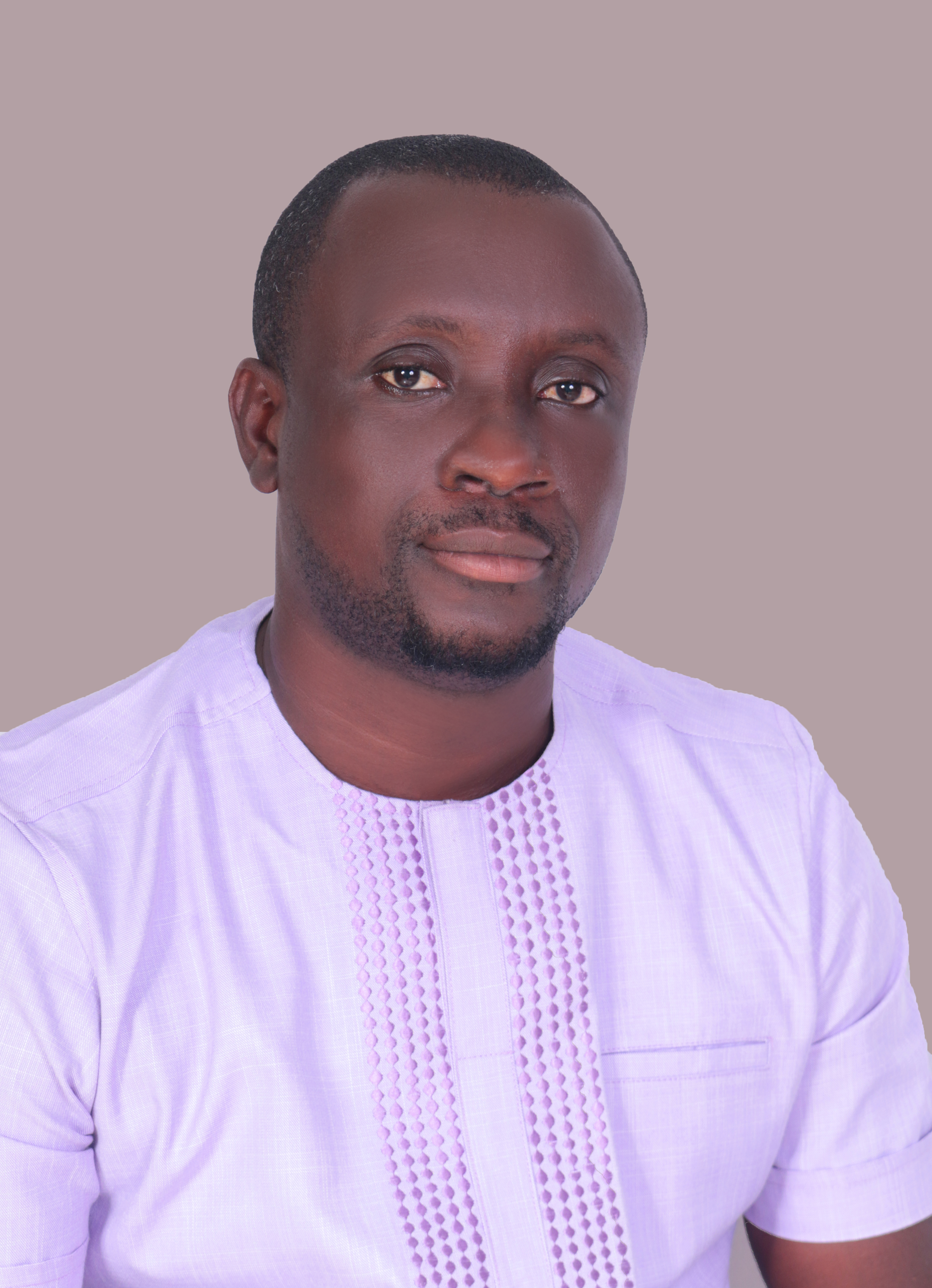

Member of Parliament for Lower West Akim Constituency
- Incumbent
- Assumed office 7 January 2021

Personal details
- Born: Charles Acheampong; 9 May 1981 (age 45) Osenase, Ghana
- Party: New Patriotic Party
- Occupation: Politician
- Profession: Manager
- Committees: Public Accounts Committee; Communications Committee

Charles Acheampong is a Ghanaian politician and member of the Eighth Parliament of the Fourth Republic of Ghana representing the Lower West Akim Constituency in the Eastern Region on the ticket of the New Patriotic Party. He is currently a board member of the Ghana News Agency.

== Early life and education ==
Acheampong was born on 9 May 1981 and hails from Osenase in the Eastern Region. He had his Masters degree in Wireless Communication in 2012.

== Career ==
Acheampong was the manager of the National Communications Authority.

=== Political career ===
Acheampong is a member of NPP and currently the MP for the Lower Akim West Constituency in the Eastern region. In the 2020 Ghana general elections, he won the parliamentary seat with 27,527 votes whilst the NDC parliamentary aspirant Micheal Adu-Sei had 19,744 votes and the GUM parliamentary aspirant Baidoo Seth Nicholas Kwame had 464 votes.

==== Committees ====
Acheampong is a member of the Public Accounts Committee and also a member of Communications Committee.

== Personal life ==
Acheampong is a Christian.
