= Wendy Steele =

American businesswoman, entrepreneur, and philanthropist

- Born: Wendy Lynne Hermann
- Education: Connecticut College
- Occupations: Founder of Impact100, social entrepreneur and consultant
- Children: 3
- Website: impact100global.org

Wendy Steele is an American civil activist, social entrepreneur and philanthropist who is best known as founder of Impact100, a nonprofit organization with over 60 chapters across the United States, the United Kingdom, Australia and New Zealand.

== Background ==
Wendy Steele grew up in Greenwich, Connecticut, and St. Louis, Missouri. She is the middle child of three daughters born to Richard Hermann, a sales executive, and Margaret (Margo) Hermann, a homemaker. She attended Connecticut College in New London, Connecticut, where she received her B.A. degree in Economics in 1985.

In addition to founding Impact100, Steele worked in private banking for more than 20 years. She moved from Connecticut to Cincinnati, Ohio, in 1992, and founded Impact100 in 2001. Steele has three children and currently resides in Traverse City, Michigan. Steele is a recipient of the 2014 Jefferson Award for establishing Impact100 and her charity activity.

== Philanthropy and civic activity ==
Steele founded Impact100 in 2001, with the first chapter registered in Cincinnati, Ohio. Impact100 received its 501(c)(3) nonprofit status in 2002. From the beginning, the organization's mission was to raise money for local and regional philanthropic causes and engage more women in philanthropic activity. The first Impact100 chapter in Cincinnati raised $123,000 in 2002 and awarded it to the McMicken Dental Clinic, which serves the homeless and uninsured. Since then, the model has been replicated in more than 60 cities across the U.S., the United Kingdom, Australia and New Zealand and donated over $90 million to charities.

Impact100 acts as an intermediary between local donors and charities within the geographical boundaries of each chapter. The main idea is to pool philanthropic contributions from at least 100 women in each chapter and then offer grants of $100,000 or more for local needs. The funding is distributed among five main program areas: education, environment, family, health and wellness, and arts and culture. Though connected by one mission, individual Impact100 chapters are operated autonomously. While the minimum requirement of every Impact100 chapter is to congregate at least 100 women in order to register and become eligible for charity activity, many chapters have more than 500 members. For example, the nonprofit's largest chapter is located in Pensacola, Florida which has more than 1,100 members.

== Book ==
Steele is the author of Invitation to Impact: Lighting the Path to Community Transformation. The book was published MFF Publishing in April 2023. The book serves as both a memoir, tracing Steele's personal and professional journey, and a guide to the philosophy and practice of collective philanthropy. It details the inception and evolution of Impact100, a model wherein women contribute financially to make significant collective contributions to impactful and sustainable projects. The narrative is interspersed by personal anecdotes that offer insights into Steele's motivations and experiences.

== Awards and recognitions ==
In 2014, Steele received the Jefferson Award for her role in establishing Impact100 and her philanthropic activities. The Jefferson Award is given to individuals who have made outstanding contributions to public service and have positively impacted their communities. In the year 2020, she was recognized as a Distinguished Honoree of the Jones Prize in Philanthropy, awarded by the Institute of Private Investors.

Steele was named among Forbes' 2021 50 Over 50 list of Women Leading the Way in Impact. In 2022, she was one of the Distinguished Women Honoree of Northwood University.

In 2024, Steele was named Woman of the Year in Florida by USA Today [27]

Steele has also been acknowledged as a notable speaker on multiple occasions.

== See also ==
- Impact100 Sonoma
