= Winners Take All: The Elite Charade of Changing the World =

2018 non-fiction book by Anand Giridharadas

- First edition cover
- Author: Anand Giridharadas
- Audio read by: Anand Giridharadas
- Language: English
- Subjects: Economic inequality; philanthropy
- Publisher: Alfred A. Knopf
- Publication date: August 28, 2018
- Publication place: United States
- Media type: Print (hardcover and paperback), e-book, audiobook
- Pages: 304
- ISBN: 978-0-451-49324-8 (hardcover)
- OCLC: 1065140123
- Dewey Decimal: 303.40973
- LC Class: HM831 .G477 2018

Winners Take All: The Elite Charade of Changing the World is a 2018 non-fiction book by American author Anand Giridharadas. Published by Alfred A. Knopf on August 28, 2018, it was the author's third book but his first to appear on The New York Times Best Seller list. Written in a satiric tone, Winners Take All highlights America's growing wealth inequality and skewers "the philanthropic plutocrats and aspiring 'change agents' who believe they are helping but are actually making things worse."

== Background ==
The book grew out of a speech Giridharadas delivered in July 2015 at the Aspen Institute. He had spent considerable time there since being awarded one of its Henry Crown Fellowships in 2011. In the many seminar discussions he attended, he observed "what we mostly agree not to question, even as we question so much". His speech was referred to as the "Aspen Consensus" because a large portion was devoted to defining the shared assumptions that prevailed at the institute:

The Aspen Consensus, in a nutshell, is this: the winners of our age must be challenged to do more good. But never, ever tell them to do less harm. The Aspen Consensus holds that capitalism's rough edges must be sanded and its surplus fruit shared, but the underlying system must never be questioned. The Aspen Consensus says, "Give back," which is of course a compassionate and noble thing. But, amid the $20 million second homes and $4,000 parkas of Aspen, it is gauche to observe that giving back is also a Band-Aid that winners stick onto the system that has privileged them, in the conscious or subconscious hope that it will forestall major surgery to that system – surgery that might threaten their privileges. The Aspen Consensus, I believe, tries to market the idea of generosity as a substitute for the idea of justice."

The speech was mentioned in The New York Times and generated numerous requests for copies. Giridharadas decided to expand on the ideas into book-length form, in what would become Winners Take All. He later noted, "I hadn't planned to write a book on this topic, but the topic chose me."

== Thesis ==
The book's central thesis is that members of the global elite are using philanthropic institutions to preserve a system that concentrates wealth and power at the top at the expense of societal progress. Giridharadas examines the narrow limits of modern philanthropy, claiming that rich donors avoid contributing to causes which could undermine their own lofty status. He argues that in some cases, the political lobbying efforts of wealthy donors may reduce the government's ability to address inequality.

Giridharadas highlights what he sees as an irony in elite networking forums such as the Aspen Institute, World Economic Forum, and Clinton Global Initiative, which he claims "groom the rich to be self-appointed leaders of social change, taking on the problems people like them have been instrumental in creating or sustaining." A key argument he makes is that there is deception involved—his book's subtitle calls it a "charade"—when wealthy donors position themselves as champions of reform, because by doing so they are warding off real reform:

The question we confront is whether moneyed elites, who already rule the roost in the economy and exert enormous influence in the corridors of political power, should be allowed to continue their conquest of social change and of the pursuit of greater equality. The only thing better than controlling money and power is to control the efforts to question the distribution of money and power. The only thing better than being a fox is being a fox asked to watch over hens.

Giridharadas says he hopes by exposing the "charade" in Winners Take All, "the path to genuine change will come into view. It will once again be possible to improve the world without permission slips from the powerful."

== Publication and promotion ==
Winners Take All was first published in hardcover by Alfred A. Knopf on August 28, 2018. It was published in paperback on October 1, 2019, by Vintage Books.

The book debuted at number eight on the Hardcover Nonfiction best sellers list and at number six on the Combined Print & E-Book Nonfiction best sellers list in the September 16, 2018 issue of The New York Times Book Review. The paperback edition debuted at number eight on the Paperback Nonfiction best sellers list in the October 20, 2019 issue of The New York Times Book Review.

Giridharadas appeared on The Daily Show on October 1, 2019, to promote Winners Take All. He also spoke about the book's thesis on Patriot Act with Hasan Minhaj on December 1, 2019.

== Reception ==
In The New York Times, economist Joseph Stiglitz praised Winners Take All, saying that Giridharadas "writes on two levels—seemingly tactful and subtle—but ultimately he presents a devastating portrait of a whole class, one easier to satirize than to reform." Publishers Weekly also gave the book a positive review, writing, "This damning portrait of contemporary American philanthropy is a must-read for anyone interested in 'changing the world.'" Kirkus Reviews called it a "provocative critique of the kind of modern, feel-good giving that addresses symptoms and not causes." James Pekoll of Booklist characterized it as an "excellent book for troubled times".

Bethany McLean of The Washington Post gave the book a mixed review, criticizing Giridharadas for not engaging "in any specific analysis" and writing that "the book would have been more powerful if Giridharadas had stayed within his definition of an old-school public intellectual: someone who is willing to throw bombs at the current state of affairs, but lacks the arrogance and self-righteousness that comes with believing you have the solution."

Andrew Anthony of The Guardian also gave the book a mixed review: "So much of what Giridharadas writes is almost self-evidently true and urgently in need of addressing, yet his argument is slightly undermined by repetition and a reluctance to acknowledge that big business and technical innovation are sometimes forces for universal good, even if profits are made."

Winners Take All was listed in The Economist's "Our books of the year", where it was described as a "timely polemic against philanthrocapitalism, which argues that supposedly do-gooding companies merely offer sticking-plaster solutions to social problems that they have helped create."
