= Colleen Willoughby =

American philanthropist (born 1934)

Colleen Seidelhuber Willoughby
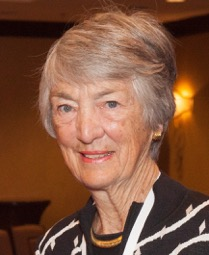
- Colleen Willoughby in 2017
- Born: 1934 (age 91–92)
- Citizenship: United States of America
- Education: Whitman College '55
- Known for: Founding the Washington Women's Foundation
- Board member of: Women's Collective Giving Network
- Spouse: George Willoughby

Colleen S. Willoughby is an American philanthropist and the founder and former president of the Washington Women's Foundation, and the director of Global Women Partners in Philanthropy.

== Early life and career ==
Colleen Seidelhuber was born around 1934. Both of her parents volunteered regularly. Her father volunteered at the YMCA and her mother at the local Parent Teacher Association.

Willoughby attended Whitman College, studying political science and speech. She graduated in 1955. It was at Whitman where she would meet her future husband, George Willoughby. After the couple married, Willoughby taught junior high school. She would eventually quit to become a housewife, caring for the couple's two children, Scott and Anne.

== Philanthropy ==
Willoughby volunteered for years, increasing her time spent volunteering as her children became adults. She volunteered at the Seattle Art Museum, with the Camp Fire Boys and Girls, Junior League and Planned Parenthood. She served as president of the Junior League of Seattle and on the boards of the Association of Junior Leagues International, Seattle Children's Home and the United Way. Since 1981, Willoughby has organized the Women in Leadership Symposium at Whitman College. She serves as trustee emerita at Whitman College and as an advisory board member at the Evans School of Public Policy & Governance at the University of Washington.

=== Seattle CityClub ===
After years of being civically, Willoughby noticed that few women served on boards and/or were involved in decision making at nonprofits. In response to this, Willoughby and seven other women founded the Seattle CityClub. The organization educates its members about civic participation and nonprofit management. They CityClub has over 47,000 members.

Every year, the Colleen Willoughby Youth Civic Education Award is awarded by the Seattle CityClub. The award recognizes contributions by young people who are leading others in civic participation.

=== Washington Women's Foundation ===
My mother’s tool was a mixmaster, but mine is money.

— Colleen Willoughby, 2013

Willoughby observed that women often volunteered at nonprofits but rarely donated financially, unlike men whose names often outweigh women's names on donor lists. As a response, Willoughby co-founded the Washington Women's Foundation (WWF) in 1995. Within two months, Willoughby and four of her friends had recruited 116 women to join. Members of WWF donate $2,000 each, with $1,000 being donated to nonprofits of that member's choice. The remaining $1,000 is placed into a grantmaking fund. Each year members review grant proposals from local nonprofits and vote on the most worthy nonprofit out of the group to receive a $100,000 grant. This concept, the pooling of $1,000 from each member to be gifted as a collective $100,000, is utilized nationwide through other collective giving groups, including Impact100 Sonoma.

Today, WWF awards grants in five focus areas: health, human services, environment, education, and arts & culture. Within three years of its founding, WWF had granted almost $1 million to nonprofits. As of 2015, the WWF had over 500 members.

In 2002, the Bill & Melinda Gates Foundation awarded WWF a grant to create a book about its giving model titled Something Ventured: An Innovative Model in Philanthropy.

=== Women's Collective Giving Grantmakers Network ===
As a response to the growing number of collective giving groups, Willoughby started the Women's Collective Giving Grantmakers Network (WCGN) to serve as the umbrella organization for groups similar to the WWF. Incorporated in Charlotte, North Carolina, WCGN provides support and tools to current and future women-led giving groups and hosts regular meetings and an annual conference. As of 2017, WCGN has 49 member organizations in 24 states and two countries and over 10,000 women members from member organizations. In 2019, the organization changed its name to Catalist.

=== Philanthropic research work at University of Washington ===
Willoughby is active in women's philanthropic research at the Evans School of Public Policy & Governance at the University of Washington. She founded the Global Women's Philanthropy Project, which researches how collective giving models can be launched and successful in China. Willoughby also serves on the advisory board for the Evans School of Public Policy & Governance at the University of Washington and is the former chair of the school.

== Awards ==
Willoughby was awarded the Junior League of Seattle's Dorothy Stimson Bullitt Community Service Award in 1991. She was named a 2004 Woman of Influence by the Puget Sound Business Journal. In 2008, Willoughby was named a Storm Woman of Inspiration by the Seattle Storm. The following year, 2009, Willoughby was awarded the Mary Harriman Award by the Junior League for her work with the Junior League, women, and in fundraising. She received the 25th A.K. Guy Award from the YMCA in 2012, for her "extraordinary commitment to and leadership in philanthropy, women’s leadership, civic engagement, and youth issues."

== Personal life ==
Willoughby resides in Seattle and Lopez Island. She has five grandchildren.
