= Colleen A. Kraft =

American pediatrician

- Born: Colleen Anne McGrath; March 4, 1960 (age 66)
- Education: Virginia Tech, VCU School of Medicine, University of Cincinnati
- Occupation: Pediatrician
- Known for: President of the American Academy of Pediatrics
- Awards: Fellow of the American Academy of Pediatrics

Colleen A. Kraft (born Colleen Anne McGrath, March 4, 1960) is an American pediatrician specialized in community pediatrics, child advocacy, and healthcare financing.

== Early life and education ==
In 1965, Kraft graduated in the first class of the Head Start program. She completed a bachelor's degree at Virginia Tech. Kraft earned a M.D. at the VCU School of Medicine. She completed a pediatric residency at VCU. She completed a M.B.A. at the University of Cincinnati.

== Career ==
Kraft worked in community pediatrics in Richmond, Virginia. In 2009, became the founding pediatric program director at the Virginia Tech Carilion School of Medicine and Research Institute. From 2014 to 2017, she was head of the pediatric accountable care program at Cincinnati Children's Hospital Medical Center. From 2016 to 2017, Kraft served as the medical director of a health network and pediatric health initiative at the Children's Hospital Medical Center.

Kraft was president of the Virginia chapter of the American Academy of Pediatrics (AAP) from 2006 to 2008. She was president of the AAP for a one-year term starting January 1, 2018. As president, she advocated for humane treatment of children at the Mexico–United States border and elaborated on the harm of the zero tolerance of the Trump administration family separation policy.

=== Research ===
Kraft was principal investigator for the Children's Hospital Association's Health Care Innovation Award. Her clinical focuses includes community pediatrics, child advocacy, health care financing, and pediatric education. Her research interests include early brain and childhood development and children with special healthcare needs.

== Awards and honors ==
Kraft is a fellow of the American Academy of Pediatrics.

== Personal life ==
In April 1981 in Montgomery County, Virginia, she married Kenneth Allen Kraft (born 1956). They became the parents of three children.

== Selected works ==
- Donoghue, Elaine A.; Kraft, Colleen A., eds. (2009). Managing Chronic Health Needs in Child Care and Schools: A Quick Reference Guide. American Academy of Pediatrics. ISBN 978-1-58110-299-4. OCLC 730049329. quick reference guide pdf's at aap.org; description of 2018 pbk 2nd edition at aap.org 2018 pbk edition. American Academy of Pediatrics. August 2018. ISBN 978-1-61002-175-3.
