= Colleen Atkinson =

Irish camogie player

Personal information
- Native name: Cailín Nic Aidicín (Irish)
- Born: 25 November 1986 (age 39) Wexford, Ireland

Sport
- Sport: Camogie
- Position: Left Corner Back
- Position: Left Corner Back
Club*
Years	Club	Apps (scores)
	Oulart–The Ballagh	?
Inter-county**
Years	County	Apps (scores)
	Wexford	?
Inter-county titles
- All-Irelands: 3
- All Stars: 2
- * club appearances and scores correct as of (16:31, 30 Sept 2011 (UTC)). **Inter County team apps and scores correct as of (16:31, 30 Sept 2011 (UTC)).

Colleen Atkinson is a camogie player from County Wexford in Ireland. She was captain of the Wexford team that won the 2011 All-Ireland Intermediate Camogie Championship.

Atkinson also won National Camogie League medals in 2009, 2010 and 2011. She won an All-Ireland Senior Camogie Championship medal in 2007; Her younger sister, Karen Atkinson has also played for Wexford.
