= Colleen Houck =

American writer (born 1969)

- Born: October 3, 1969 (age 56)
- Occupation: Writer

Colleen Houck (born October 3, 1969) is an American writer known for writing The New York Times two best selling series, Tiger's Curse and Reawakened. As an author, she has been largely collected by libraries worldwide.

== Personal life ==
Colleen is a member of The Church of Jesus Christ of Latter Day Saints. She served an eighteen month, American sign language mission in Riverside, California for The Church and then later married in the Salt Lake Temple in 1994. With her experience in sign language she became an ASL interpreter for seventeen years. After the success of the first two "Tiger's Curse" books, Colleen put down full time interpreting and became a full time writer instead. Colleen has lived in Arizona, Idaho, Utah, California, and North Carolina and is now currently resides in Salem, Oregon with her husband.

=== Writing history and motivation ===
Colleen currently has published eleven books with one more, "Terraformer" on the way (as of March 2021). Colleen was inspired by the writers J. K. Rowling and Stephenie Meyer, as they were both ordinary people without any specific education for writing and publishing. Colleen decided to start writing and then self published Tiger's Curse and Tiger's Quest which then gained traction on Amazon's eBook best-seller list and was picked up by Sterling Publishers.

== Publications ==
=== The Tiger's Curse Saga ===
Her first book was Tigers Curse which was originally self-published in early 2011. It was named a best seller by New York Times and received an average rating of 4.09. The book was reviewed by the Los Angeles Times, MTV and Publishers Weekly. The main character is Kelsey Hayes, who is just looking for a part-time job, but adventure finds her and finally she goes to India with a white tiger in searching for an ancient legend.

Tiger's Curse (The Tiger Saga #1) was published in early 2011. It received an average rating of 4.09.

Tiger’s Quest (The Tiger Saga #2) was published in June 2011. It received an average rating of 4.36.

Tigers Voyage (The Tiger Saga #3) was published in late 2011. It received an average rating of 4.36.

Tigers Destiny (Tiger Saga #4) was published in the middle of 2012. It received an average rating of 4.42.

Tigers Promise (The Tiger Saga #0.5) was published in the middle of 2014. It is a precursor to the main storyline of the Tiger Saga. It received an average rating of 4.23.

Tigers Dream (The Tiger Saga #5) was published in 2018 and it's the final book in the Tiger Saga series.

In 2011, Paramount Pictures had announced to plans produce Tiger's Curse into a film.

=== Reawakened ===
Reawakened (Reawakened #1) was published near the end of 2015. It received an average rating of 3.88. It was reviewed by Publishers Weekly.

Recreated (Reawakened #2) was published in August 2016. It was by reviewed by Deseret News

Reignited (a novella in the series)

Reunited (the final book Reawakened #3)

=== Standalone ===
- The Lantern's Ember (September 11, 2018)

== Awards ==
Winner of 2011 Parents Choice Award for the fiction genre
