= Impact100 =

US nonprofit organization

- Formation: 2001
- Founder: Wendy Steele
- Type: Nonprofit
- Purpose: Philanthropy
- Website: impact100global.org

Impact100 is a nonprofit philanthropic organization with local chapters in the United States, Australia, New Zealand, and the United Kingdom, that was founded by Wendy Steele in 2001.

== History ==
In 2001, Wendy Steele founded Impact100 in Cincinnati, Ohio, with a goal to organize 100 women to each donate $1,000 and then collectively award a grant to a local nonprofit organization. This model of fundraising is known as a giving circle. The first effort by the fifteen members of the Impact100 board gathered 123 donations, and the donors voted to award the first grant to the McMicken Dental Center in Cincinnati.

Impact100 Global was formed in 2015 to support local Impact100 chapters. By 2021, Impact100 had sixty chapters in the United States as well as chapters in Australia, the United Kingdom, and New Zealand.

== Chapters ==
=== Atlanta ===
In 2023, the Atlanta chapter, with 273 members, gave $273,000 in grants.

=== Cincinnati ===
After its official formation in 2002, Impact100 Cincinnati had awarded $2.5 million in grants and had 327 members by 2014. By 2016, $3.65 million was donated in the Greater Cincinnati and Northern Kentucky region. By 2020, the organization had grown to 541 members and awarded more than $5.12 million in grants.

=== Greater Milwaukee ===
Impact100 Greater Milwaukee began in 2015, and had 218 members by the end of the year.

=== Nashville ===
Formed in 2014 with 26 members, Impact100 Nashville grew to 100 members by 2019 and 203 by 2021, and had awarded $570,000 in grants.

=== Northwest Florida ===
After its formation in 2012, Impact100 Northwest Florida had 418 members and had awarded $3.6 million in grants by 2021. The organization has also created a NextGen program to subsidize membership fees for new members.

=== Oakland County ===
Formed in 2016, the Oakland County chapter had 320 members in 2023 and gave $320,000 in grants.

=== Orange County ===
Impact100 OC was formed in 2022 with a mission to deliver high-impact grants that support local nonprofits, reach underserved populations, and address unmet needs within our community. By 2024, the organization has awarded $103,000 in grants.

=== Pensacola ===
Impact100 Pensacola began in 2004, and by 2014 had awarded $5.1 million in grants.

=== Philadelphia ===
Impact100 Philadelphia began awarding grants in 2009, and by 2019 recorded 398 members. In 2018, the organization introduced a Young Philanthropists membership with a reduced donation level, and also offers sponsored memberships.

=== Sonoma ===
In 2009, Christine Dohrmann and Annette Lomont co-founded Impact100 Sonoma. Lomont and Dohrmann promoted the idea to their friends and in August 2009, they hosted an open meeting for Sonoma Valley women to attend. Over 50 women attended the first meeting. By December, they had over 100 members. As of 2019, the organization had 319 members, and had awarded over $2.3 million to Sonoma Valley nonprofits.

=== Traverse City ===
Formed in 2017 with 225 members, Impact100 Traverse City grew to 316 members by 2020 and had awarded over $1.1 million in grants. In September 2024, Impact100 granted $348,000 in grants to three separate non-profits in the Traverse City area.
