= Philanthropy =

Private efforts to increase public good

Philanthropy is a form of altruism that consists of "private initiatives for the public good, focusing on quality of life". Philanthropy tends to be used interchangeably with the term charity. Charity has been noted in Egypt, centuries before the Christian era, having religious origins. Philanthropy contrasts with business initiatives, which are private initiatives for the private good, focusing on material gain; and with government endeavors that are public initiatives for the public good, such as those that focus on the provision of public services. Present day philanthropy has evolved into providing long-term aid and change, rather than immediate relief. A person who practices philanthropy is a philanthropist.

== Etymology ==
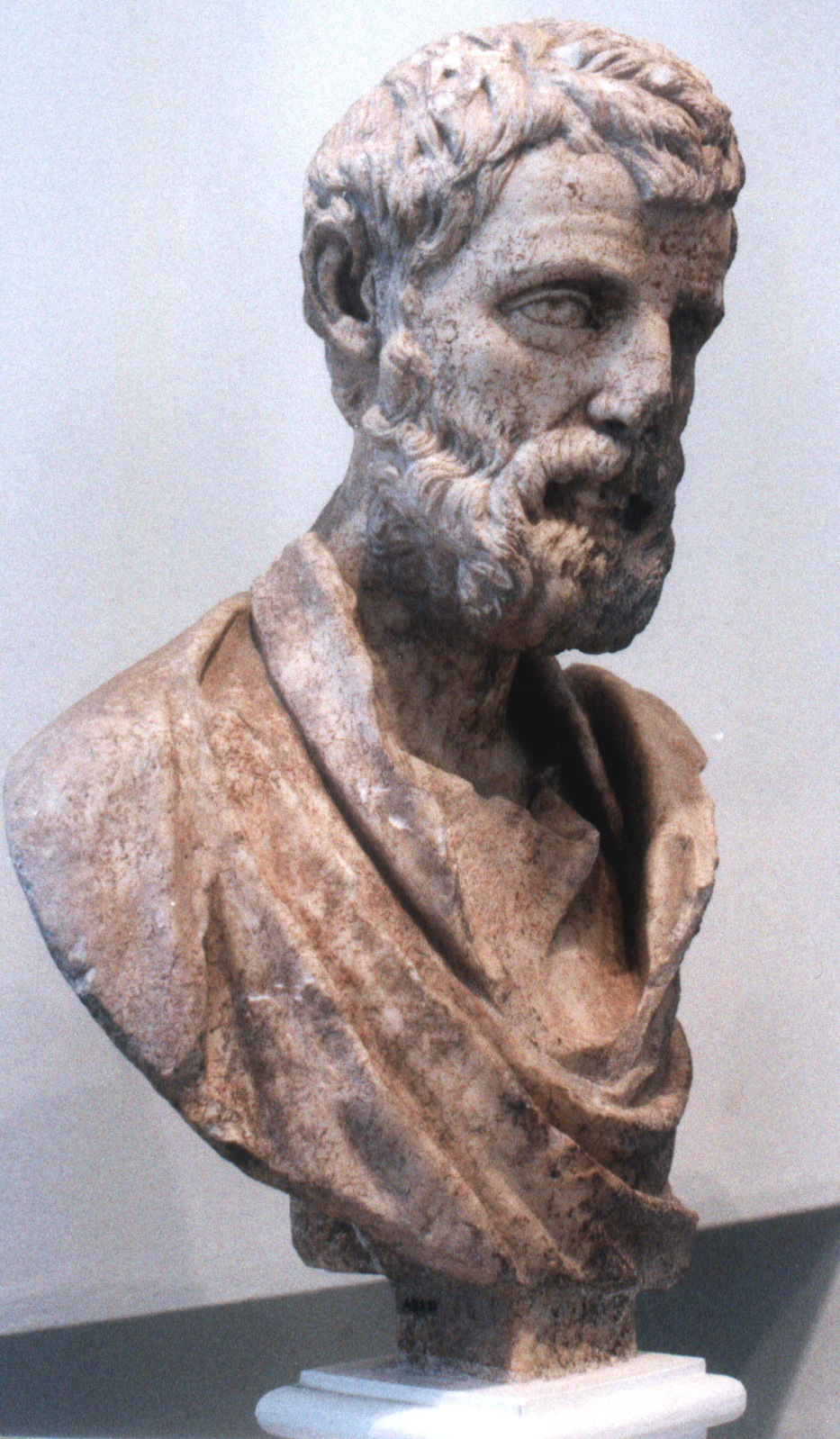
Herodes Atticus, a Greek philanthropist of Ancient Rome active during the 2nd century CE

The word philanthropy comes from Ancient Greek φιλανθρωπία (philanthrōpíca) 'love of humanity', from philo- 'to love, be fond of' and anthrōpos 'humankind, mankind'. In the second century CE, Plutarch used the Greek concept of philanthrôpía to describe superior human beings.

During the Middle Ages, philanthrôpía was superseded in Europe by the Christian virtue of charity (Latin: caritas) in the sense of selfless love, valued for salvation and escape from purgatory. Thomas Aquinas held that "the habit of charity extends not only to the love of God, but also to the love of our neighbor".

Sir Francis Bacon considered philanthrôpía to be synonymous with "goodness", correlated with the Aristotelian conception of virtue as consciously instilled habits of good behaviour. Samuel Johnson defined philanthropy as "love of mankind; good nature". Philanthrôpía is now often translated as "love of humanity".

== Europe ==
=== Great Britain ===
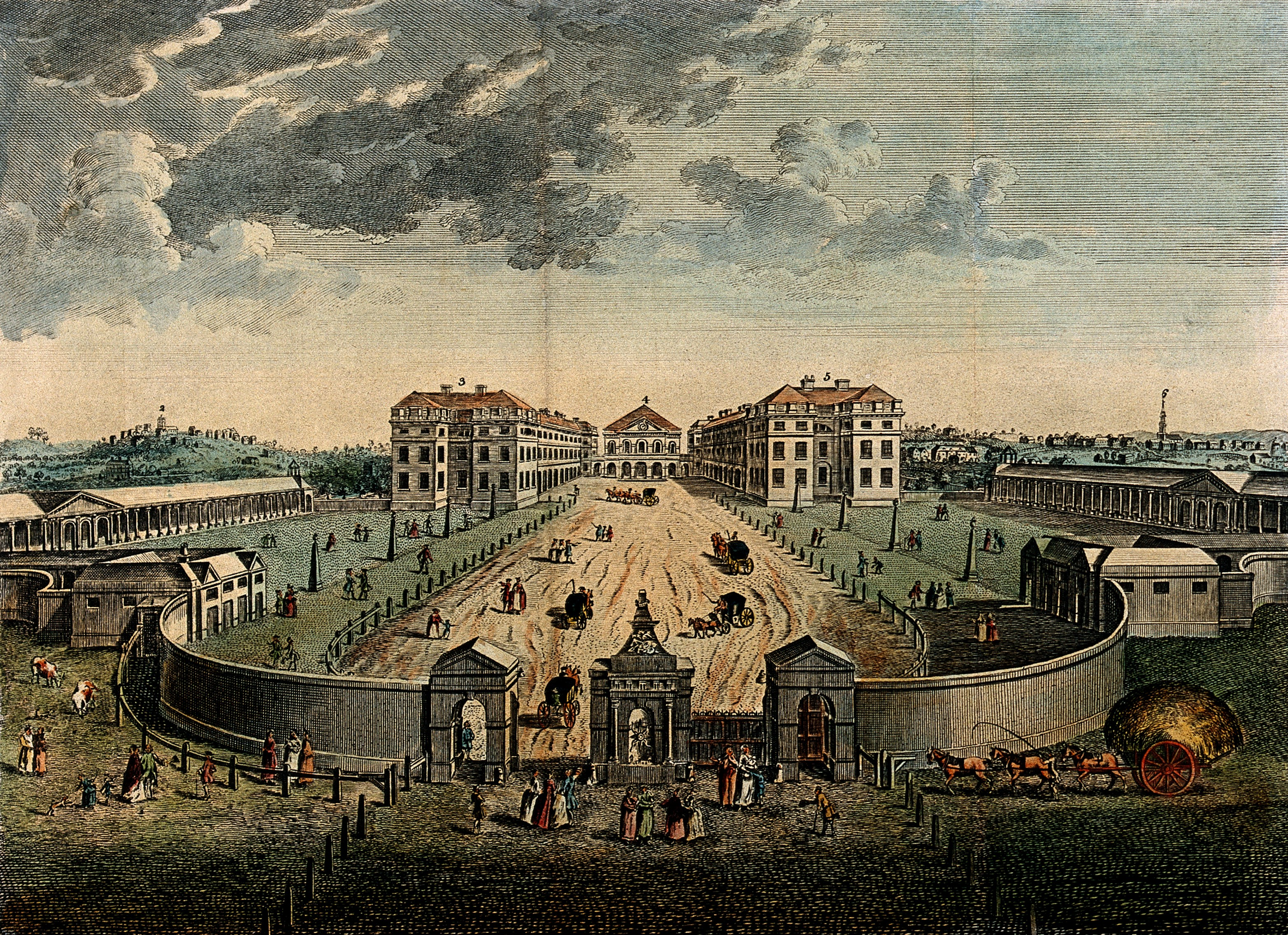
The Foundling Hospital in London, c. 1753. The original building has since been demolished.

In London, prior to the 18th century, parochial and civic charities were typically established by bequests and operated by local church parishes (such as St Dionis Backchurch) or guilds (such as the Carpenters' Company). During the 18th century, however, "a more activist and explicitly Protestant tradition of direct charitable engagement during life" took hold, exemplified by the creation of the Society for the Promotion of Christian Knowledge and Societies for the Reformation of Manners.

In 1739, Thomas Coram, appalled by the number of abandoned children living on the streets of London, received a royal charter to establish the Foundling Hospital to look after these unwanted orphans in Lamb's Conduit Fields, Bloomsbury. This was "the first children's charity in the country, and one that 'set the pattern for incorporated associational charities' in general." The hospital "marked the first great milestone in the creation of these new-style charities."

Jonas Hanway, another notable philanthropist of the era, established The Marine Society in 1756 as the first seafarer's charity, in a bid to aid the recruitment of men to the navy. By 1763, the society had recruited over 10,000 men and it was incorporated in 1772. Hanway was also instrumental in establishing the Magdalen Hospital to rehabilitate prostitutes. These organizations were funded by subscriptions and run as voluntary associations. They raised public awareness of their activities through the emerging popular press and were generally held in high social regard—some charities received state recognition in the form of the Royal Charter.

==== 19th century ====
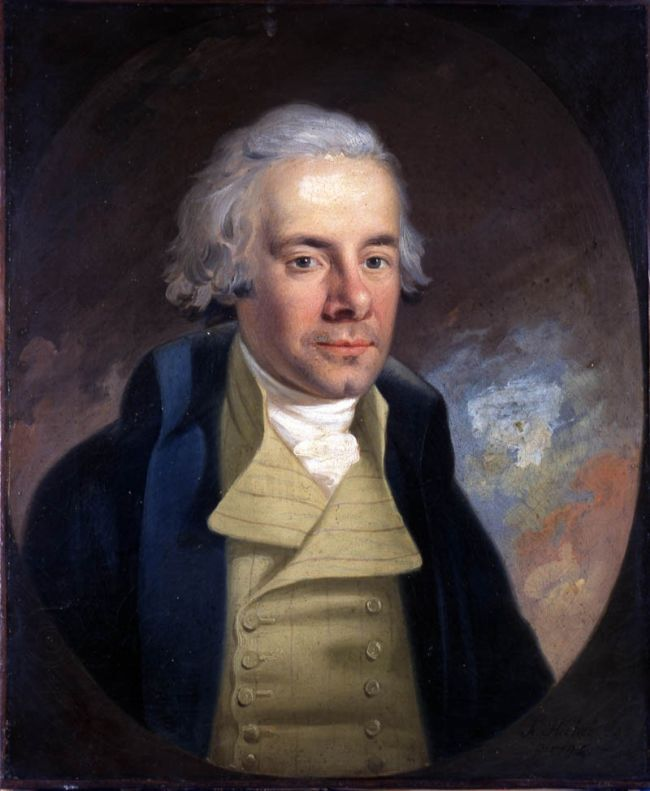
William Wilberforce, a prominent British philanthropist and anti-slavery campaigner

Philanthropists, such as anti-slavery campaigner William Wilberforce, began to adopt active campaigning roles, where they would champion a cause and lobby the government for legislative change. This included organized campaigns against the ill-treatment of animals and children and the campaign that succeeded in ending the slave trade throughout the Empire starting in 1807. Although there were no slaves allowed in Britain itself, many rich men owned sugar plantations in the West Indies, and resisted the movement to buy them out until it finally succeeded in 1833.

Financial donations to organized charities became fashionable among the middle class in the 19th century. By 1869 there were over 200 London charities with an annual income, all together, of about £2 million. By 1885, rapid growth had produced over 1000 London charities, with an income of about £4.5 million. They included a wide range of religious and secular goals, with the American import, YMCA, as one of the largest, and many small ones, such as the Metropolitan Drinking Fountain Association. In addition to making annual donations, increasingly wealthy industrialists and financiers left generous sums in their wills. A sample of 466 wills in the 1890s revealed a total wealth of £76 million, of which £20 million was bequeathed to charities. By 1900 London charities enjoyed an annual income of about £8.5 million.

Led by the energetic Lord Shaftesbury (1801–1885), philanthropists organized themselves. In 1869 they set up the Charity Organisation Society. It was a federation of district committees, one in each of the 42 Poor Law divisions. Its central office had experts in coordination and guidance, thereby maximizing the impact of charitable giving to the poor. Many of the charities were designed to alleviate the harsh living conditions in the slums. such as the Labourer's Friend Society founded in 1830. This included the promotion of allotment of land to labourers for "cottage husbandry" that later became the allotment movement. In 1844 it became the first Model Dwellings Company—an organization that sought to improve the housing conditions of the working classes by building new homes for them, while at the same time receiving a competitive rate of return on any investment. This was one of the first housing associations, a philanthropic endeavor that flourished in the second half of the nineteenth century, brought about by the growth of the middle class. Later associations included the Peabody Trust, and the Guinness Trust. The principle of philanthropic intention with capitalist return was given the label "five per cent philanthropy."

=== Switzerland ===
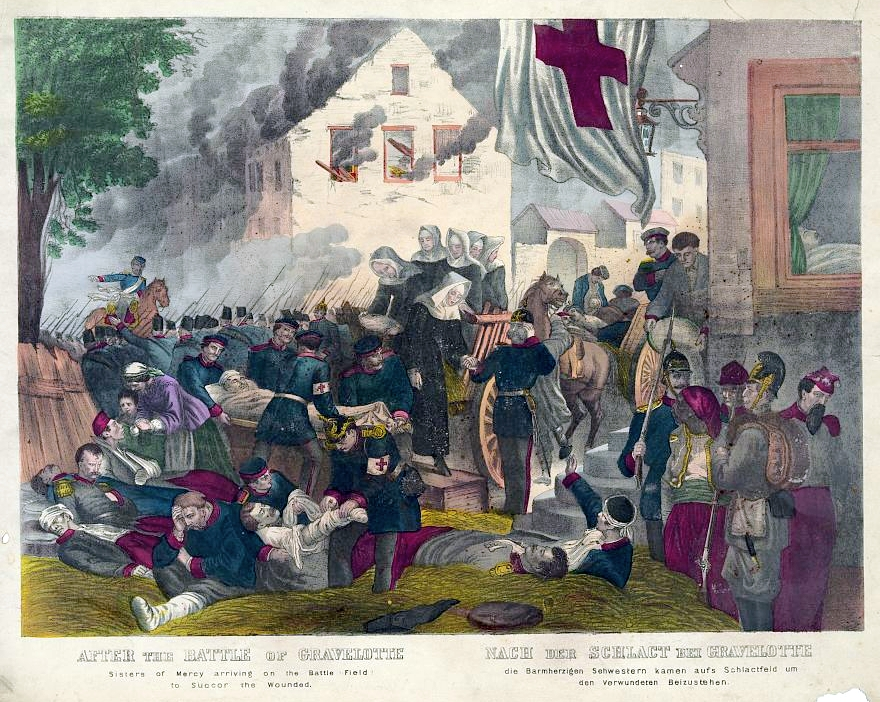
The Red Cross, after the Battle of Gravelotte in 1870

In 1863, the Swiss businessman Henry Dunant used his fortune to fund the Geneva Society for Public Welfare, which became the International Committee of the Red Cross. During the Franco-Prussian War of 1870, Dunant personally led Red Cross delegations that treated soldiers. He shared the first Nobel Peace Prize for this work in 1901.

The International Committee of the Red Cross (ICRC) played a major role in working with POWs on all sides in World War II. It was in a cash-starved position when the war began in 1939, but quickly mobilized its national offices to set up a Central Prisoner of War Agency. For example, it provided food, mail and assistance to 365,000 British and Commonwealth soldiers and civilians held captive. Suspicions, especially by London, of ICRC as too tolerant or even complicit with Nazi Germany led to its side-lining in favour of the UN Relief and Rehabilitation Administration (UNRRA) as the primary humanitarian agency after 1945.

=== France ===
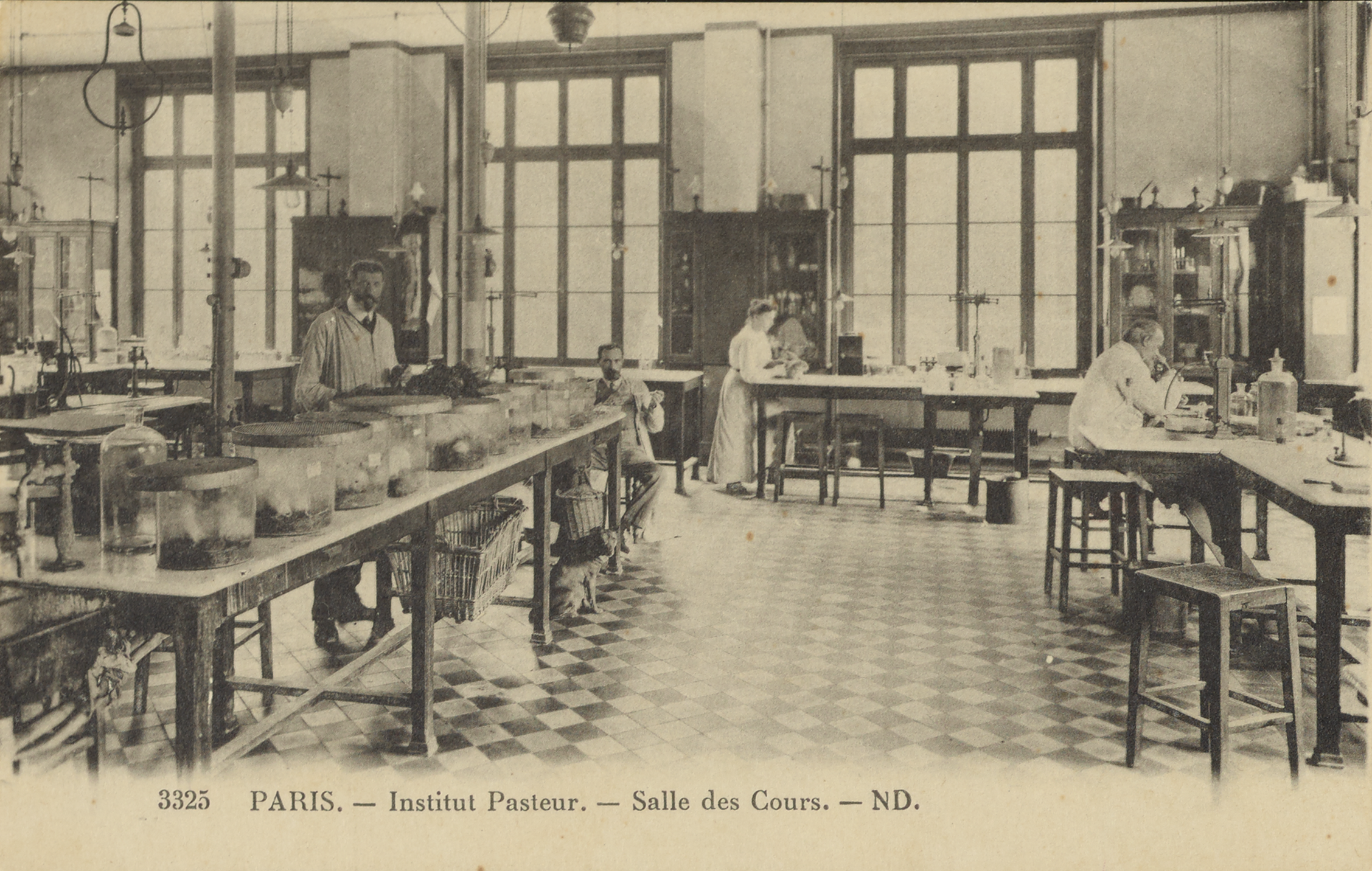
Men and woman working in a classroom at the Institut Pasteur in Paris, c. 1920

The French Red Cross played a minor role in the war with Germany (1870–71). After that, it became a major factor in shaping French civil society as a non-religious humanitarian organization. It was closely tied to the army's Service de Santé. By 1914 it operated one thousand local committees with 164,000 members, 21,500 trained nurses, and over 27 million French francs in assets.

The Pasteur Institute had a monopoly of specialized microbiological knowledge, allowing it to raise money for serum production from private and public sources, walking the line between a commercial pharmaceutical venture and a philanthropic enterprise.

By 1933, at the depth of the Great Depression, the French wanted a welfare state to relieve distress but did not want new taxes. War veterans devised a solution: the new national lottery proved highly popular to gamblers while generating the cash needed without raising taxes.

American money proved invaluable. The Rockefeller Foundation opened an office in Paris and helped design and fund France's modern public health system under the National Institute of Hygiene. It also set up schools to train physicians and nurses.

=== Germany ===
The history of modern philanthropy on the European continent is especially important in the case of Germany, which became a model for others, especially regarding the welfare state. The princes and the various imperial states continued traditional efforts, funding monumental buildings, parks, and art collections. Starting in the early 19th century, the rapidly emerging middle classes made local philanthropy a way to establish their legitimate role in shaping society, pursuing ends different from the aristocracy and the military. They concentrated on support for social welfare, higher education, and cultural institutions, as well as working to alleviate the hardships brought on by rapid industrialization. The bourgeoisie (upper-middle class) was defeated in its effort to gain political control in 1848, but it still had enough money and organizational skills that could be employed through philanthropic agencies to provide an alternative power base for its worldview.

Religion was divisive in Germany, as Protestants, Catholics, and Jews used alternative philanthropic strategies. The Catholics, for example, continued their medieval practice of using financial donations in their wills to lighten their punishment in purgatory after death. The Protestants did not believe in purgatory, but made a strong commitment to improving their communities there and then. Conservative Protestants raised concerns about deviant sexuality, alcoholism, and socialism, as well as illegitimate births. They used philanthropy to try to eradicate what they considered as "social evils" that were seen as utterly sinful. All the religious groups used financial endowments, which multiplied in number and wealth as Germany grew richer. Each was devoted to a specific benefit to that religious community, and each had a board of trustees; laymen donated their time to public service.

Chancellor Otto von Bismarck, an upper-class Junker, used his state-sponsored philanthropy, in the form of his invention of the modern welfare state, to neutralize the political threat posed by the socialistic labor unions. The middle classes, however, made the most use of the new welfare state, in terms of heavy use of museums, gymnasiums (high schools), universities, scholarships, and hospitals. For example, state funding for universities and gymnasiums covered only a fraction of the cost; private philanthropy became essential. Nineteenth-century Germany was even more oriented toward civic improvement than Britain or the United States, when measured in voluntary private funding for public purposes. Indeed, such German institutions as the kindergarten, the research university, and the welfare state became models copied by the Anglo-Saxons.

The heavy human and economic losses of the First World War, the financial crises of the 1920s, as well as the Nazi regime and other devastation by 1945, seriously undermined and weakened the opportunities for widespread philanthropy in Germany. The civil society so elaborately built up in the 19th century was dead by 1945. However, by the 1950s, as the "economic miracle" was restoring German prosperity, the old aristocracy was defunct, and middle-class philanthropy started to return to importance.

=== War and postwar: Belgium and Eastern Europe ===
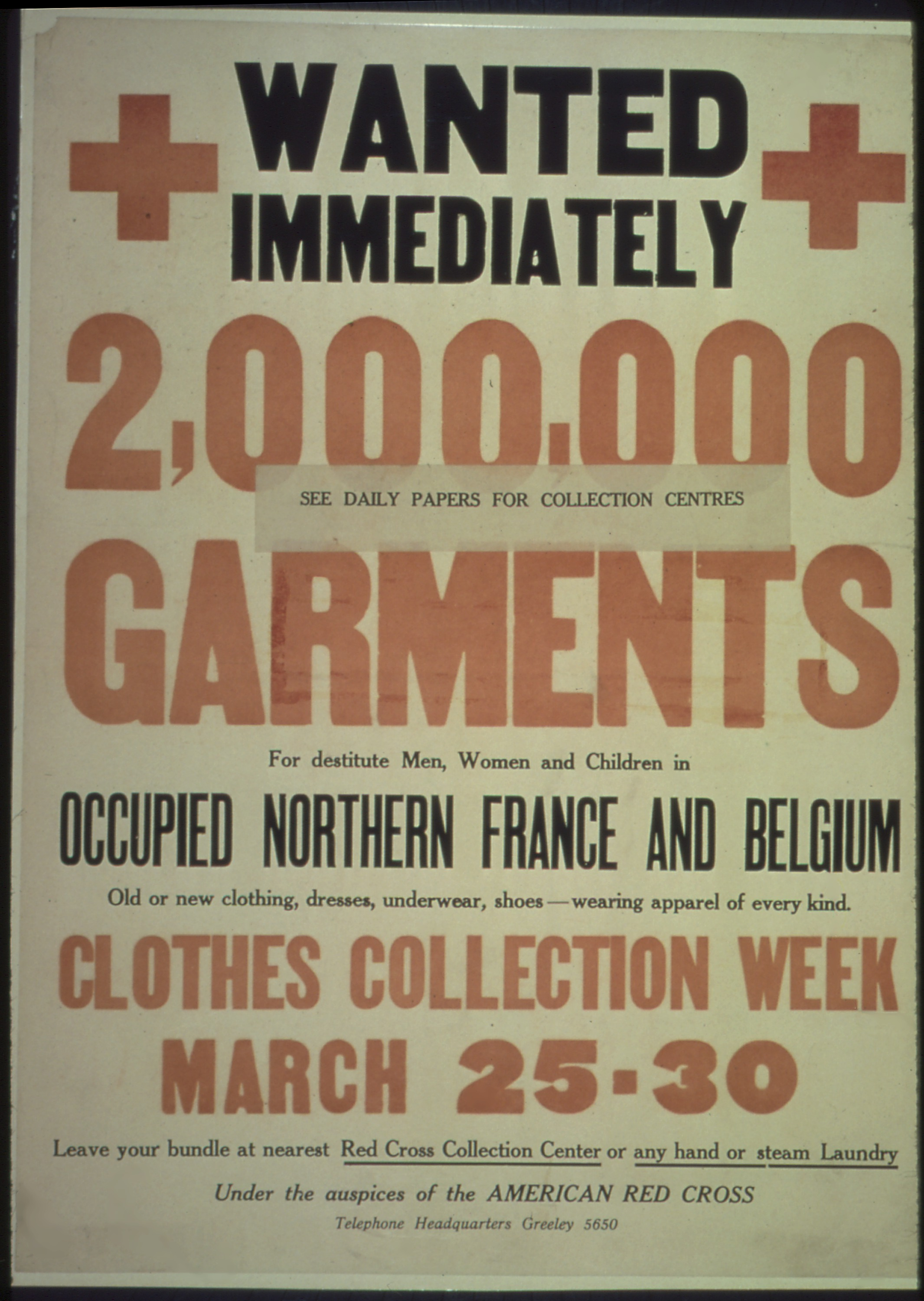
Poster requesting clothing for occupied France and Belgium

The Commission for Relief in Belgium (CRB) was an international (predominantly American) organization that arranged for the supply of food to German-occupied Belgium and northern France during the First World War. It was led by Herbert Hoover. Between 1914 and 1919, the CRB operated entirely with voluntary efforts and was able to feed eleven million Belgians by raising money, obtaining voluntary contributions of money and food, shipping the food to Belgium and controlling it there. For example, the CRB shipped 697,116,000 pounds of flour to Belgium. Biographer George Nash finds that by the end of 1916, Hoover "stood preeminent in the greatest humanitarian undertaking the world had ever seen." Biographer William Leuchtenburg adds, "He had raised and spent millions of dollars, with trifling overhead and not a penny lost to fraud. At its peak, his organization fed nine million Belgians and French daily.

When the war ended in late 1918, Hoover took control of the American Relief Administration (ARA), with the mission of food to Central and Eastern Europe. The ARA fed millions. U.S. government funding for the ARA expired in the summer of 1919, and Hoover transformed the ARA into a private organization, raising millions of dollars from private donors. Under the auspices of the ARA, the European Children's Fund fed millions of starving children. When attacked for distributing food to Russia, which was under Bolshevik control, Hoover snapped, "Twenty million people are starving. Whatever their politics, they shall be fed!"

== United States ==
The first corporation founded in the Thirteen Colonies was Harvard College (1636), designed primarily to train young men for the clergy. A leading theorist was the Puritan theologian Cotton Mather (1662–1728), who in 1710 published a widely read essay, "Bonifacius, or an Essay to Do Good". Mather worried that the original idealism had eroded, so he advocated philanthropic benefaction as a way of life. Though his context was Christian, his idea was also characteristically American and explicitly Classical, on the threshold of the Enlightenment.

Benjamin Franklin (1706–1790) was an activist and theorist of American philanthropy. He was much influenced by Daniel Defoe's An Essay upon Projects (1697) and Cotton Mather's Bonifacius: an essay upon the good (1710). Franklin attempted to motivate his fellow Philadelphians into projects for the betterment of the city: examples included the Library Company of Philadelphia (the first American subscription library), the fire department, the police force, street lighting, and a hospital. A world-class physicist himself, he promoted scientific organizations including the Philadelphia Academy (1751) – which became the University of Pennsylvania – as well as the American Philosophical Society (1743), to enable scientific researchers from all 13 colonies to communicate.

By the 1820s, newly rich American businessmen were initiating philanthropic work, especially with respect to private colleges and hospitals. George Peabody (1795–1869) is the acknowledged father of modern philanthropy. A financier based in Baltimore and London, in the 1860s, he began to endow libraries and museums in the United States and also funded housing for poor people in London. His activities became a model for Andrew Carnegie and many others.

=== Andrew Carnegie ===
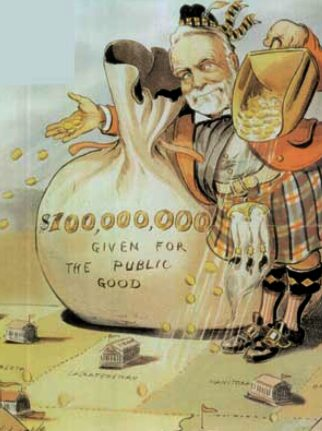
Andrew Carnegie's philanthropy. Puck magazine cartoon by Louis Dalrymple, 1903

Andrew Carnegie (1835–1919) was the most influential leader of philanthropy on a national (rather than local) scale. After selling his steel company in 1901 he devoted himself to establishing philanthropic organizations and to making direct contributions to many educational, cultural, and research institutions. He financed over 2,500 public libraries built across the United States and abroad. He also funded Carnegie Hall in New York City and the Peace Palace in the Netherlands.

His final and largest project was the Carnegie Corporation of New York, founded in 1911 with a US$25 million endowment, later enlarged to US$135 million. Carnegie Corporation has endowed or otherwise helped to establish institutions that include the Russian Research Center at Harvard University (now known as the Davis Center for Russian and Eurasian Studies), the Brookings Institution and the Sesame Workshop. In all, Andrew Carnegie gave away 90% of his fortune.

=== John D. Rockefeller ===
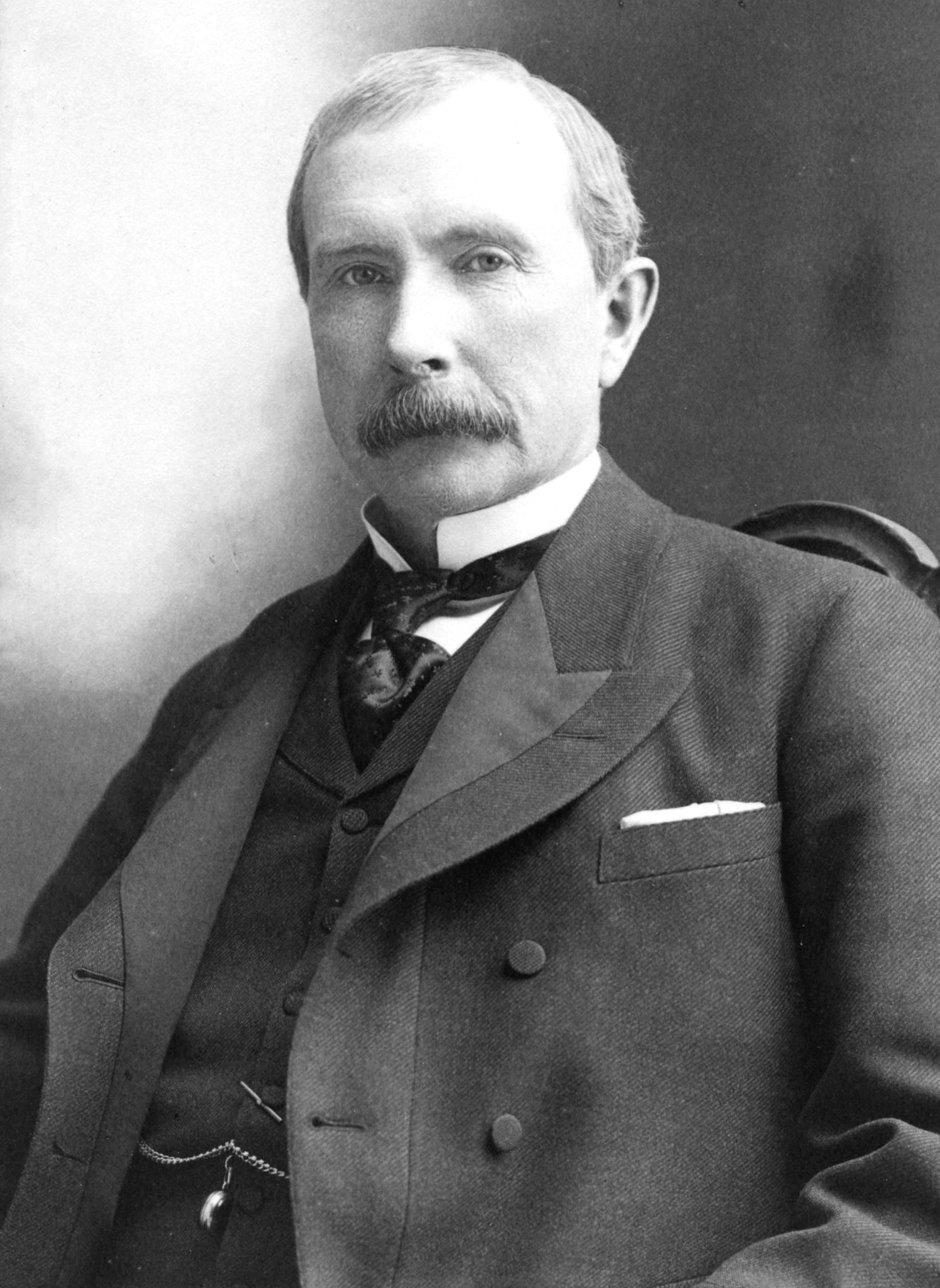
John D. Rockefeller in 1895

Other prominent American philanthropists of the early 20th century included John D. Rockefeller (1839–1937), Julius Rosenwald (1862–1932) and Margaret Olivia Slocum Sage (1828–1918).

Rockefeller retired from business in the 1890s; he and his son John D. Rockefeller Jr. (1874–1960) made large-scale national philanthropy systematic, especially with regard to the study and application of modern medicine, higher education, and scientific research. Of the US$530 million the elder Rockefeller gave away, US$450 million went to medicine. Their leading advisor Frederick Taylor Gates launched several large philanthropic projects staffed by experts who sought to address problems systematically at the roots rather than let the recipients deal only with their immediate concerns.

By 1920, the Rockefeller Foundation was opening offices in Europe. It launched medical and scientific projects in Britain, France, Germany, Spain, and elsewhere. It supported the health projects of the League of Nations. By the 1950s, it was investing heavily in the Green Revolution, especially the work by Norman Borlaug that enabled India, Mexico, and many poor countries to upgrade their agricultural productivity dramatically.

=== Ford Foundation ===
With the acquisition of most of the stock of the Ford Motor Company in the late 1940s, the Ford Foundation became the largest American philanthropy, splitting its activities between the United States and the rest of the world. Outside the United States, it established a network of human rights organizations, promoted democracy, gave large numbers of fellowships for young leaders to study in the United States, and invested heavily in the Green Revolution, whereby poor nations dramatically increased their output of rice, wheat, and other foods. Both Ford and Rockefeller were heavily involved. Ford also gave heavily to build up research universities in Europe and worldwide. For example, in Italy in 1950, sent a team to help the Italian ministry of education reform the nation's school system, based on meritocracy (rather than political or family patronage) and democratisation (with universal access to secondary schools). It reached a compromise between the Christian Democrats and the Socialists to help promote uniform treatment and equal outcomes. The success in Italy became a model for Ford programs and many other nations.

The Ford Foundation in the 1950s wanted to modernize the legal systems in India and Africa, by promoting the American model. The plan failed, because of India's unique legal history, traditions, and profession, as well as its economic and political conditions. Ford, therefore, turned to agricultural reform. The success rate in Africa was no better, and that program closed in 1977.

== Asia ==
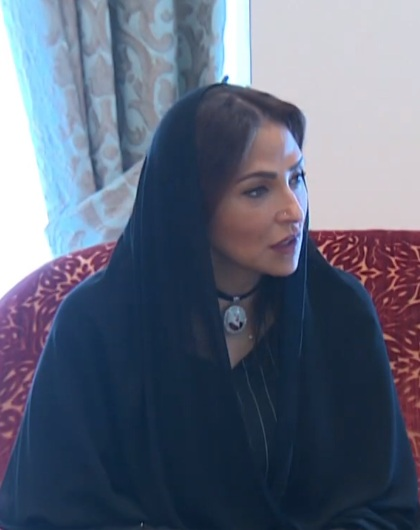
Saudi Arabian philanthropist Lamia bint Majed al-Saud

While charity has a long history in Asia, as of 2018 philanthropy or a systematic approach to doing good remains nascent. Chinese philosopher Mozi (c. 470 – c. 391 BCE) developed the concept of "universal love" (jiān'ài, 兼愛), a reaction against perceived over-attachment to family and clan structures within Confucianism. Other interpretations of Confucianism see concern for others as an extension of benevolence.

Muslims in countries such as Indonesia are bound zakat (almsgiving), while Buddhists and Christians throughout Asia may participate in philanthropic activities. In India, corporate social responsibility is now mandated, with 2% of net profits to be directed towards charity.

Asia is home to most of the world's billionaires, surpassing the United States and Europe in 2017. Wikipedia's list of countries by number of billionaires shows four Asian economies in the top ten: 495 in China, 169 in India, 66 in Hong Kong, and 52 in Taiwan (as of April 2023).

While the region's philanthropy practices are relatively under-researched compared to those of the United States and Europe, the Centre for Asian Philanthropy and Society (CAPS) produces a study of the sector every two years. In 2020, its research found that if Asia were to donate the equivalent of two percent of its GDP, the same as the United States, it would unleash US$507 billion (HK$3.9 trillion) annually, more than 11 times the foreign aid flowing into the region every year and one-third of the annual amount needed globally to meet the sustainable development goals by 2030.

== Australia ==
Structured giving in Australia through foundations is slowly growing, although public data on the philanthropic sector is sparse. There is no public registry of philanthropic foundations as distinct from charities more generally.

Two foundation types for which some data is available are Private Ancillary Funds (PAFs) and Public Ancillary Funds (PubAFs). Private Ancillary Funds have some similarities to private family foundations in the US and Europe, and do not have a public fundraising requirement. Public Ancillary Funds include community foundations, some corporate foundations, and foundations that solely support single organisations such as hospitals, schools, museums, and art galleries. They must raise funds from the general public.

=== Dame Elisabeth Murdoch ===
There are multiple women throughout the 19th and 20th century in Australia who have been dedicated to Philanthropy. One of these women, Dame Elisabeth Murdoch, has made large strides with her philanthropic endeavors. In 1952, she began making considerable donations after becoming widowed. In 1954, she became the president of Royal Children's Hospital. The hospital was relocated and rebuilt, due to her efforts in planning and managing fundraisers. Murdoch rivaled the standard of remaining anonymous with contributions and challenged philanthropists to take more than monetary action in their work, encouraging that they contribute time and effort.

== Africa ==
=== Egypt ===
Egyptians hold a dominant Islamic religion, one that holds the belief that donating will bring them closer to God. These donations are known as awqaf. They have funded numerous welfare and social services such as education, hospitals, and shelters. This has been standard throughout the majority of the Ottoman Empire, recently changing in the 20th century. In more modern years, there has been a gradual shift from individual giving to philanthropy from large organizations. However, most Egyptians still find value in practicing their offering with anonymity and independence.

=== Liberia ===
Liberia has created the world's first national-level office that deals with philanthropic work. Established in 2009, Liberia brought a new unit into the Office of the President of Liberia known as the Liberia Philanthropy Secretariat. A unique office, it was created to help increase and coordinate external funding from international philanthropists. In its first two years, it garnered over 16 million dollars in commitments and disbursements. Liberia has used its philanthropic funds to help support Monrovia City, University of Liberia, and JKF Medical Center, and more. The Liberia Philanthropic Secretariat captured the attention of many funders, including the Bill & Melinda Gates and Rockefeller Foundations.

== Differences between traditional and new philanthropy ==
=== Impact investment versus traditional philanthropy ===
Traditional philanthropy and impact investment can be distinguished by how they serve society. Traditional philanthropy is usually short-term, where organizations obtain resources for causes through fund-raising and one-off donations. The Rockefeller Foundation and the Ford Foundation are examples of such; they focus more on financial contributions to social causes and less on actions and processes of benevolence. Impact investment, on the other hand, focuses on the interaction between individual wellbeing and broader society by promoting sustainability. Stressing the importance of impact and change, they invest in different sectors of society, including housing, infrastructure, healthcare and energy.

A suggested explanation for the preference for impact investment philanthropy to traditional philanthropy is the gaining prominence of the Sustainable Development Goals (SDGs) since 2015. Almost every SDG is linked to environmental protection and sustainability because of rising concerns about how globalisation, consumerism, and population growth may affect the environment. As a result, development agencies have seen increased demands for accountability as they face greater pressure to fit with current developmental agendas.

=== Traditional philanthropy versus philanthrocapitalism ===
Philanthrocapitalism differs from traditional philanthropy in how it operates. Traditional philanthropy is about charity, mercy, and selfless devotion improving recipients' wellbeing. Philanthrocapitalism, is philanthropy transformed by business and the market, where profit-oriented business models are designed that work for the good of humanity. Share value companies are an example. They help develop and deliver curricula in education, strengthen their own businesses and improve the job prospects of people. Firms improve social outcomes, but while they do so, they also benefit themselves.

The rise of philanthrocapitalism can be attributed to global capitalism. Therefore, philanthropy has been seen as a tool to sustain economic and firm growth, based on human capital theory. Through education, specific skills are taught that enhance people's capacity to learn and their productivity at work.

Intel invests in science, technology, engineering, and mathematics (STEM) curricular standards in the US and provides learning resources and materials for schools, for its innovation and revenue. The New Employment Opportunities initiative in Latin America is a regional collaboration to train one million youth by 2022 to raise employment standards and ultimately provide a talented pool of labour for companies.

XTX Markets has committed over £400 million in philanthropic funding for STEM research, AI breakthroughs in mathematics, and talent mobility alongside partners at the Global Talent Fund, Renaissance Philanthropy, and universities including Oxford, Cambridge, Bristol, Edinburgh, and Imperial College London.

=== Promoting equity through science and health philanthropy ===
Philanthropy has the potential to foster equity and inclusivity in various fields, such as scientific research, development, and healthcare. Addressing systemic inequalities in these sectors can lead to more diverse perspectives, innovations, and better overall outcomes.

Scholars have examined the importance of philanthropic support in promoting equity in different areas. For example, Christopherson et al. highlight the need to prioritize underrepresented groups, promote equitable partnerships, and advocate for diverse leadership within the scientific community. In the healthcare sector, Thompson et al. emphasize the role of philanthropy in empowering communities to reduce health disparities and address the root causes of these disparities. Research by Chandra et al. demonstrates the potential of strategic philanthropy to tackle health inequalities through initiatives that focus on prevention, early intervention, and building community capacity. Similarly, a report by the Bridgespan Group suggests that philanthropy can create systemic change by investing in long-term solutions that address the underlying causes of social issues, including those related to science and health disparities. A report in Nature argues that scientific philanthropies could provide equitable support for scientific research amid partisan public funding cuts.

To advance equity in science and healthcare, philanthropists can adopt several key strategies:

- Prioritize underrepresented groups: Support scientists and health professionals from diverse backgrounds to help address historical injustices and foster diversity.
- Encourage equitable partnerships: Facilitate collaborations between institutions from different backgrounds to promote knowledge exchange and a fair distribution of resources.
- Advocate for diverse leadership: Support initiatives that emphasize diversity and inclusion in leadership positions within scientific and health institutions.
- Invest in early-career professionals: Help create a more equitable pipeline for future leaders in science and healthcare by investing in early-career researchers and health professionals.
- Influence policy changes: Utilize philanthropic influence to advocate for policy changes that address systemic inequalities in science and health.

Through these approaches, philanthropy can significantly promote equity within scientific and health communities, leading to more inclusive and effective advancements.

== Types of philanthropy ==
Philanthropy is defined differently by different groups of people; many define it as a means to alleviate human suffering and advance the quality of life. There are many forms of philanthropy, allowing for different impacts by different groups in different settings.

=== Celebrity philanthropy ===
Celebrity philanthropy refers to celebrity-affiliated charitable and philanthropic activities. It is a scholarship topic in studies of "the popular" vis-à-vis the modern and post-modern world. Structured and systematised charitable giving by celebrities is a relatively new phenomenon. Although charity and fame are associated historically, it was only in the 1990s that entertainment and sports celebrities from affluent western societies became involved with a particular type of philanthropy. Celebrity philanthropy in contemporary western societies is not isolated to large one-off monetary donations. It involves celebrities using their publicity, brand credibility, and personal wealth to promote not-for-profit organisations, which are increasingly business-like in form.

This is sometimes termed as "celanthropy"—the fusion of celebrity and cause as a representation of what the organisation advocates.

==== Implications on government and governance ====
The advent of celebrity philanthropy has coincided with the contraction of government involvement in areas such as welfare support and foreign aid to name a few. This can be identified from the proliferation of neoliberal policies.

Public interest groups, not-for-profit organisations and the United Nations now budget extensive amounts of time and money to use celebrity endorsers in their campaigns. An example of this is the People's Climate March of 2014. The demonstration was part of the larger People's Climate Movement, which aims to raise awareness of climate change and environmental issues more generally. Notable celebrities who were part of this campaign included actors Leonardo DiCaprio, Mark Ruffalo, and Edward Norton.

==== Examples ====
- Band Aid
- Danny Thomas and St. Jude Children's Research Hospital
- Geena Davis Institute on Gender in Media
- Jerry Lewis and the MDA Telethon
- List of UNICEF Goodwill Ambassadors
- LiveAid
- NetAid
- Newman's Own
- Remote Area Medical
- Richard Gere Activism
- The Concert for Bangladesh
- Tiger Woods Foundation
- USA for Africa

=== Diaspora philanthropy ===
Diaspora philanthropy is philanthropy conducted by diaspora populations either in their country of residence or in their countries of origin. Diaspora philanthropy is a newly established term with many variations, including migrant philanthropy, homeland philanthropy, and transnational giving. In diaspora philanthropy, migrants and their descendants are frontline distributors of aid, and enablers of development. For many countries, diaspora philanthropy is a prominent way in which members of the diaspora invest back into their homeland countries.

Along with diaspora-led foreign direct investment, diaspora philanthropy is a force in the development of a country. Members of a diaspora are familiar with their community's needs and the social, political, and economic factors that influence the delivery of those needs. Studies show that those who are a part of the diaspora are more aware of the pressing and neglected issues of their community than outsiders or other well wishers. Also given their deep ties to their country of origin, diaspora philanthropies have greater longevity than other international philanthropies. Due to the distance buffer accompanied with diaspora philanthropy, diaspora philanthropy is more willing to address controversial issues found in their country of origin compared to local philanthropy.

African American philanthropists have made significant contributions across various fields, including mental health, education, entrepreneurship, and disaster relief. Taraji P. Henson's Boris Lawrence Henson Foundation focuses on mental health awareness and support for those affected by mental illness, particularly within the African American community. Shawn Carter's Shawn Carter Foundation provides scholarships and educational opportunities to underserved youth, aiming to improve access to higher education and support students in achieving their academic goals. Damon John's FUBU Foundation promotes entrepreneurship by offering mentorship and resources to aspiring business owners. Additionally, Rihanna's Clara Lionel Foundation provides disaster relief and humanitarian aid, helping communities in need during crises and supporting global emergency response efforts. While there are dozens more examples, each of these foundations reflects the African American community's commitment to addressing critical issues and improving the lives of individuals in diverse and impactful ways.

=== Trust-based philanthropy ===
Trust-based philanthropy is an approach which aims to give greater decision-making power to the leaders of non-profits, as opposed to the donor. This differs from the often stringent restrictions placed on donations in traditional philanthropy.

== Criticism ==
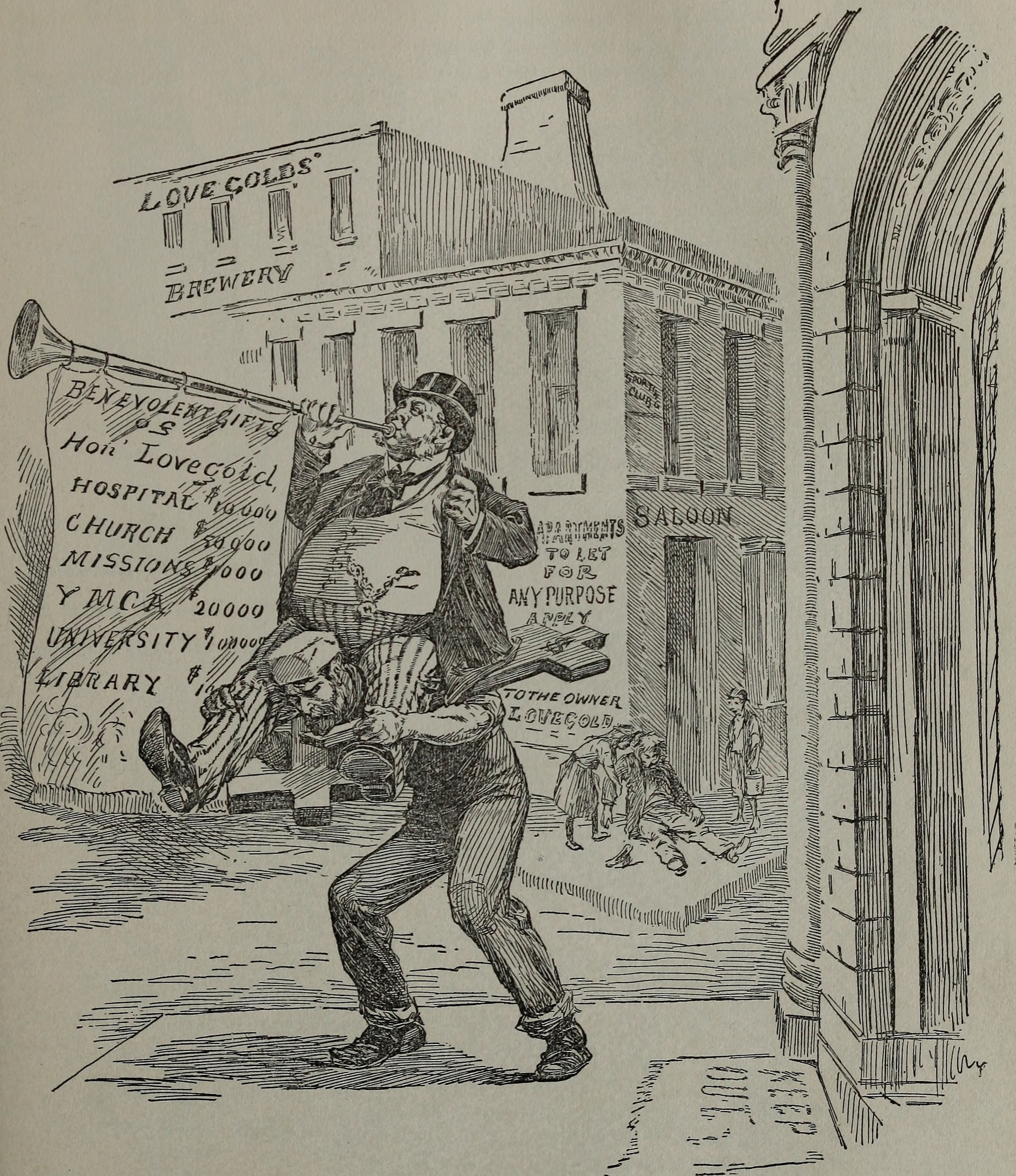
1902 cartoon criticizing Gilded Age philantrhropism. The wealthy capitalist "Hon. Lovegold" rides the shoulders of an honest man, tooting his horn whose bannerol lists his "benevolent gifts" to public and religious institutions. In the background are paupers at the corner of a building labelled with the sources of Lovegold's wealth: a brewery, a saloon, and "apartments to let for any purpose". "Blasts" From the Ram's Horn.

Philanthropy has been used by ultra high-net-worth individuals to offset their larger tax liabilities through charitable contribution deductions enabled by the tax code. In the book Winners Take All: The Elite Charade of Changing the World by Anand Giridharadas, he asserts that various philanthropic initiatives by the wealthy elite in practice function to entrench the power structures and special interests of the wealthy elite. For example, despite Robert F. Smith's generosity by paying off the student debt incurred by the Morehouse class of 2019, he simultaneously fought against changes to the tax code that could have made more money available to help low-income students pay for college. As a result, Giridharadas argues, Smith's philanthropic giving functions to reinforce the prevailing status quo and perpetuates income inequality, instead of addressing the root cause of social issues.

Jane Mayer highlights how wealthy donors, like the Koch brothers, use philanthropy to promote policies that serve their financial interests. Their donations, targeting think tanks and educational programs, influence public opinion on issues like tax cuts for the rich, deregulation, slashing the welfare state, and climate change denial, shaping American politics without being traditional campaign contributions. Mayer criticizes the anonymity of such donations, made through organizations like Donors Trust, which are not required to disclose their sources, enabling hidden political influence.

The ability of wealthy people to deduct a significant amount of their tax liabilities in the form of philanthropic giving, as noted by the late German billionaire shipping magnate and philanthropist Peter Kramer, functioned as "a bad transfer of power", from democratically elected politicians to unelected billionaires, whereby it is no longer "the state that determines what is good for the people, but rather the rich who decide". The Global Policy Forum, an independent policy watchdog which functions to monitor the activities of the United Nations General Assembly, warned governments and international organisations that they should "assess the growing influence of major philanthropic foundations, and especially the Bill & Melinda Gates Foundation… and analyse the intended and unintended risks and side-effects of their activities" prior to accepting money from rich donors. In 2015, Global Policy Forum also warned elected politicians that they should be particularly concerned about "the unpredictable and insufficient financing of public goods, the lack of monitoring and accountability mechanisms, and the prevailing practice of applying business logic to the provision of public goods".

Giridharadas also argues that philanthropy distracts the public from some of the immoral and exploitative tactics used to derive profit. For example, the Sackler family were known for their generous philanthropic giving to various cultural institutions worldwide. However, their philanthropic giving functioned as a distraction and propaganda to the public, as their legacy of generosity was tainted by the subsequent exposure of Purdue Pharma's role in encouraging and exacerbating the opioid epidemic. As a result of their exposed ill-gotten gains from the social issues caused by the philanthropic donors, the British institutions of the National Portrait Gallery, London and the Tate, along with the American institution Solomon R. Guggenheim Museum, announced their rejection of charitable giving from the Sackler family trusts. Thus, some argue that philanthropy is merely a distraction and temporary relief, both physically and spiritually for those who receive it, in replacement of facing the true causes of the issues that it attempts to relieve, such as high housing costs and economic inequality, as philanthropy typically offers no long-term solutions. According to Harvard Political Review, philanthropy currently "is only a band-aid to a much larger and deeper structural issue[s]."

== See also ==
- List of philanthropists – Overview of notable philanthropists
- List of wealthiest charitable foundations
- Charitable organization – Nonprofit organization with charitable purpose
- Effective altruism – Philosophical and social movement
- Ethics of philanthropy – Ethical issues specific to philanthropy
- Foundation (charity) – Type of nonprofit organization
- Giving circle – A form of participatory philanthropy by a group of individuals who form a voluntary association to donate their money or time
- Non-profit organization – Organization operated for a collective benefit
- Philanthropic capitalism – Method of philanthropy that mirrors a for-profit business
- Venture philanthropy – Impact investment used for philanthropy
- Visiting the sick – Philanthropic practice
