= Joshua Okoampa =

Ghanaian-born American soccer player

Josh Okoampa
Personal information
- Full name: Joshua Opoku Okoampa
- Date of birth: October 10, 1984 (age 42)
- Place of birth: Odumase Krobo, Ghana
- Height: 1.79 m (5 ft 10 in)
- Position: Striker

Youth career
- 1990–2002: Wings Soccer Club
- 1999–2002: Park Center Senior High School
- 2003–2006: University of Wisconsin–Green Bay

Senior career*
Years	Team	Apps	(Gls)
2008–2009	Türkiyemspor Berlin		
- * Club domestic league appearances and goals

Joshua Opoku Okoampa (born October 10, 1984) is an American former soccer player. He played at Türkiyemspor Berlin.

Okoampa is currently an assistant coach at Century College in White Bear Lake, Minnesota. He also serves as Technical Director of the North Oaks Blast Soccer Club.

== Career ==
A native of Brooklyn Park, Minnesota, Okoampa played college soccer at the University of Wisconsin-Green Bay. After scoring 14 goals and six assists his senior season Okoampa was named to the 2006 NSCAA/adidas Men's Collegiate All-America Third Team NCAA Division I. He was the fifth all-time scorer in school history with 36 career goals.

In February 2008 he joined Türkiyemspor Berlin of the fourth-tier Regionalliga Nord, signing a 2-year contract. Okoampa was forced to retire in August 2009 due to a leg injury.

== Awards ==
- 2006 NCAA Division I All-American
- 2006 Horizon League Offensive Player of the Year
- 2003-2006 Horizon League All-Conference First Team
- 2002 Minnesota Gatorade HS Player of the Year
- 2002 Minnesota All-State, All-Metro and Conference MVP
- 2000-2002 All-Conference
