= Colleen Opoku Amuaben =

Ghanaian preacher

Colleen Helena Opoku Amuaben
- Born: Comfort Koffie; Axim, Ghana
- Other names: The Woman Of Fire, Mama Ntease (Woman of Understanding)
- Citizenship: Ghanaian
- Occupations: General Overseer of Precious Seed Chapel Int. and Founder of several NGOs including Save Them Young Mission Inc. Orphanage
- Spouse: King Opoku Amuaben
- Website: preciousseedchapel.net, savethemyoung.org

Colleen Helena Opoku Amuaben is the General Overseer of Precious Seed Chapel International with fifteen branches in Central Africa – Democratic Republic of the Congo Kinshasa and Almeria, Spain and Ghana, with the headquarters situated in Tema and is the founder of Save Them Young Mission Incorporated. She is the third born child of Samuel Kofie who hails from Osenase and Mary Angamah who hailed from Axim.

Amuaben has traveled to 14 countries preaching the Word of God. She was also the hostess of “Precious Hour” a weekly program telecast on TV3 in Ghana, on the Internet Radio Station thepiperadio.com and is a spokeswoman at conferences.

== Early life and career ==
Born in Axim, Colleen Opoku-Amuaben had her elementary school education at a local institution then went to the Women's Training Institute between 1979 and 1981 where she was trained in fashion. In her quest for more skills and exposure she went to Nicosia Special Fashion School in Cyprus between 1983 and 1985 where she improved upon her skills and became a fashion designer.

Opoku-Amuaben returned to Ghana and has been involved in the operation of businesses. She is the chief executive officer (CEO) of Limanjess Company Limited operating a supermarket, pharmacy, cement/block factory, poultry farming, and boutique among others. She is also the manager of Kingdom Filtered Water Company.

Opoku-Amuaben is the hostess of a radio program Ntsease on Channel R (92.7fm) since 1999. She had her Bible school education at the Bible for All Nations institute between 2000 and 2001.

== Social projects ==
=== Save Them Young Mission Incorporated ===
The mission is a non-governmental organization that assists needy children, street children, orphans and children from all works of life. It has been in existence since 1995. The orphanage is taking care of 65 children in Ghana, and a branch in Congo is taking care of 150 children.

=== New Liberian Women Skilled Training Centre ===
Founded by Opoku Amuaben, at the Budumburam Camp, which is hosting the Liberians in the country Ghana, due to war in their own country. The establishment is funded by Mrs. Amuaben in training the women who are members in batik-making, sewing, hairdressing, among other skills.

=== Women of Passion ===
This is a spiritual club that helps women leave their shells and promote God in their daily activities.

=== NTEASE program ===
This is a radio program (on Channel R 92.7) hosted by Amuaben.

== Works ==
=== Bibliography ===
- Do What You Don't Like To Get What You Want
- Do Not Abort Your Pregnancy
- Like a sweet Incense unto the Lord
- Too Blessed to be Frustrated
- They Will Look for You
- Give to Get -Tithing
- They Will Wait for You
- At All At All

=== Audio tape series ===
- Behind the Prison Gate
- Whom Shall I Send?

=== DVD series ===
- Life is Precious
- Demons on Assignment
- Taking Stock of Your Life
