= Osenase =

Community in Eastern Region, Ghana

Akyem Osenase Osenasi
- Town
- Location of Osenase in Eastern Region
- Coordinates: 05°57′27.4″N 00°45′16.2″W
- Country: Ghana
- Region: Eastern Region
- District: West Akim Municipal District
- Time zone: GMT
  - Summer (DST): GMT

Akyem Osenase (also spelt Osinase) is a community near Akwatia in the West Akim Municipal District in the Eastern Region of Ghana.

== History ==
Akyem Osenase is part of the Akyem Abuakwa traditional area, also called Okyeman, in the Eastern Region of Ghana. According to tradition, the Akyem people migrated from Adansi and settled around the Birim River area. The okyeman area later developed into a large kingdom centered at kyebi .

In 2026, the chief of Osenase is Nana Barima Obeng Boakye Akese Ababio.

== Institutions ==
- Osenase Library
