= Coolen =

Coolen (Dutch pronunciation: [ˈkoːlə(n)]) is a Dutch patronymic surname. Variant forms are Colen, Kolen and Koolen. Cool and Kool are archaic short forms of the given name Nicolaas. In Canada the name may also have evolved as a modern spelling of Coulon.

Notable people with this surname include:

- Antoon Coolen (1897–1961), Dutch writer
- Coenrad Laurens Coolen (1773-?), Indonesian evangelist
- Jef Coolen (1944–2016), Belgian jazz trumpet player
- Louis Coolen (born 1952), Dutch football midfielder and manager
- Nadia Coolen (born 1994), Dutch football forward
- Nancy Coolen (born 1973), Dutch singer and television host
- Rini Coolen (born 1967), Dutch football defender and manager
- Tom Coolen (born 1953), Canadian ice hockey coach
- Yves Coolen (born 1995), Belgian cyclist

Koolen

- Dionysius A.P.N. Koolen (1871–1945), Dutch politician, Minister of Labour, Trade and Industry 1925–26
- Kees Koolen (born 1965), Dutch rally raid racer and businessman
- Nicole Koolen (born 1972), Dutch field hockey player
- Roel Koolen (born 1982), Dutch baseball player

== See also ==
- Ricky Koole (born 1972), Dutch singer and film actress
- Colen, surname and given name
- Coole (disambiguation)
