= Emde =

Emde, van Emde or von der Emde is a surname. Notable people with the surname include:

- Don Emde (born 1951), American motorcycle racer, writer and publisher
- Hans Georg Emde (born 1919–2013), German politician
- Johannes Emde (1774–1859), German evangelist
- Mala Emde (born 1996), German actress

== See also ==
- Peter van Emde Boas (born 1945), Dutch computer scientist
- Wilhelm von der Emde (1922–2020), German-Austrian civil engineer
- Emde degradation
- EMDE in international finance refers to Emerging Markets and Developing Economies
