= Coleen =

Coleen may refer to:

== People ==
- Coleen Garcia (born 1992), Filipina actress and host
- Coleen Gray (1922–2015), American actress
- Coleen K. Menlove (born 1943), Mormon leader
- Coleen Nolan (born 1965), singer
- Coleen Rooney (born 1986), wife of Wayne Rooney
- Coleen Rowley (born 1954), FBI agent and politician
- Coleen Seng (1936–2025), American politician
- Coleen Sommer (born 1960), American high jumper
- Coleen Sterritt (born 1953), Los-Angeles-based artist

== Other ==
- Coleen River

== See also ==
- Colleen (disambiguation)
- Colen, surname
- Coolen, surname
