= Jean-Michel Coulon =

French painter

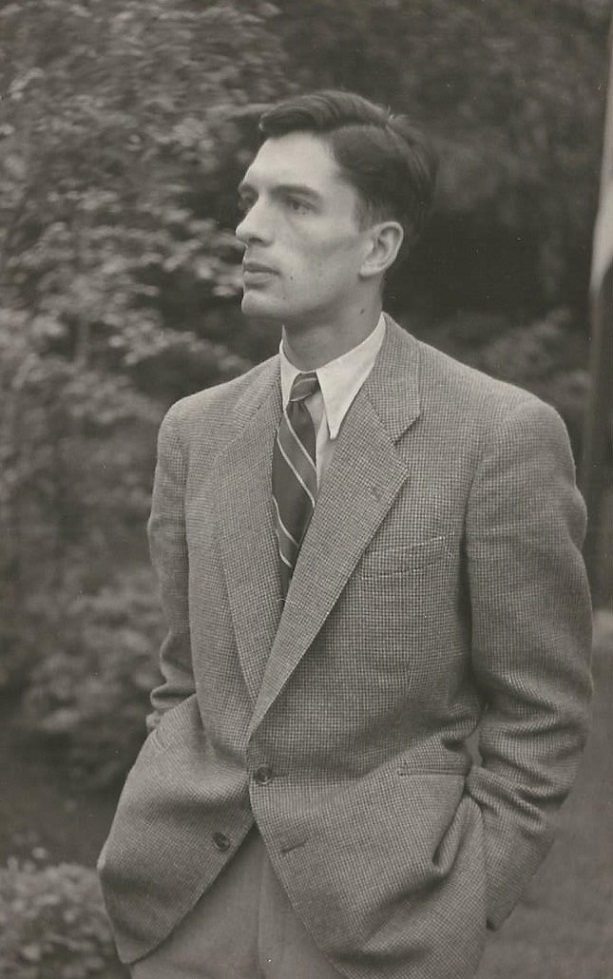
- Portrait of Jean-Michel Coulon, 1950
- Born: 10 October 1920; Bordeaux
- Died: 24 October 2014 (aged 94); Paris
- Known for: Paintings, drawings, collages
- Movement: Abstract art, School of Paris

Jean-Michel Coulon (1920–2014) was a French painter from the School of Paris who had the particularity of having kept his work – over 600 paintings – almost secret over his artistic lifetime. Exhibits took place in Paris at the Jeanne Bucher Gallery in 1949 and 1950 and in Brussels in 1971.

Being well introduced in the artistic movement of the 1940s and 50s, he was acquainted with Nicolas de Staël, Serge Poliakoff, André Lanskoy, Maria Helena Vieira da Silva, met Picasso, in particular with his brother in law Olivier Debré. He then gradually isolated himself to the point of rarely mentioning his painting.

== Biography ==
He was born in 1920 in Bordeaux, France. He was the grandson of Georges Coulon, vice-president of the Conseil d'État from 1898 to 1922, and the great-grandson of Eugène Pelletan and Eugène Scribe.

During the 1930s he studied at the Lycée Janson-de-Sailly, then at preparatory classes to the French Grandes Ecoles at the Lycée Henri-IV, Paris. He undertook numerous visits to Germany, where he quickly learned the language fluently, and to Italy after high school with his friend and future brother-in-law Olivier Debré. He traveled on cargo ships along the Atlantic and Mediterranean coasts of Africa, which he often managed to board without paying any fees. He was witness to the spread of Fascist ideology: he saw Hitler in Berlin then Mussolini in Rome.

Coulon was 20 years old when World War II broke out. In 1943, the Vichy regime introduced a compulsory work service, so he decided to leave Paris and obtained a false identity card. He went to Megève in the French Alps with Olivier Debré. It was during this period that the two friends both decided to devote themselves to painting.

In 1944, his 19-year-old brother, Jean-Rémi, was shot by the Germans at the Farm du By (Loiret).

Coulon began painting steadily in Paris in 1945.

In 1949 he met his future wife, Caroline Garabedian, an American violinist studying at the Paris Conservatory. He quickly learned English. He exhibited at the Jeanne Bucher gallery in Paris with Georges Braque, Pablo Picasso, Paul Klee, Jean Lurçat, Jean-Paul Laurens, Nicolas de Staël, André Lanskoy, Maria Helena Vieira da Silva, Hans Reichel, André Bauchant, Alfred Manessier, Árpád Szenes and Vassily Kandinsky.

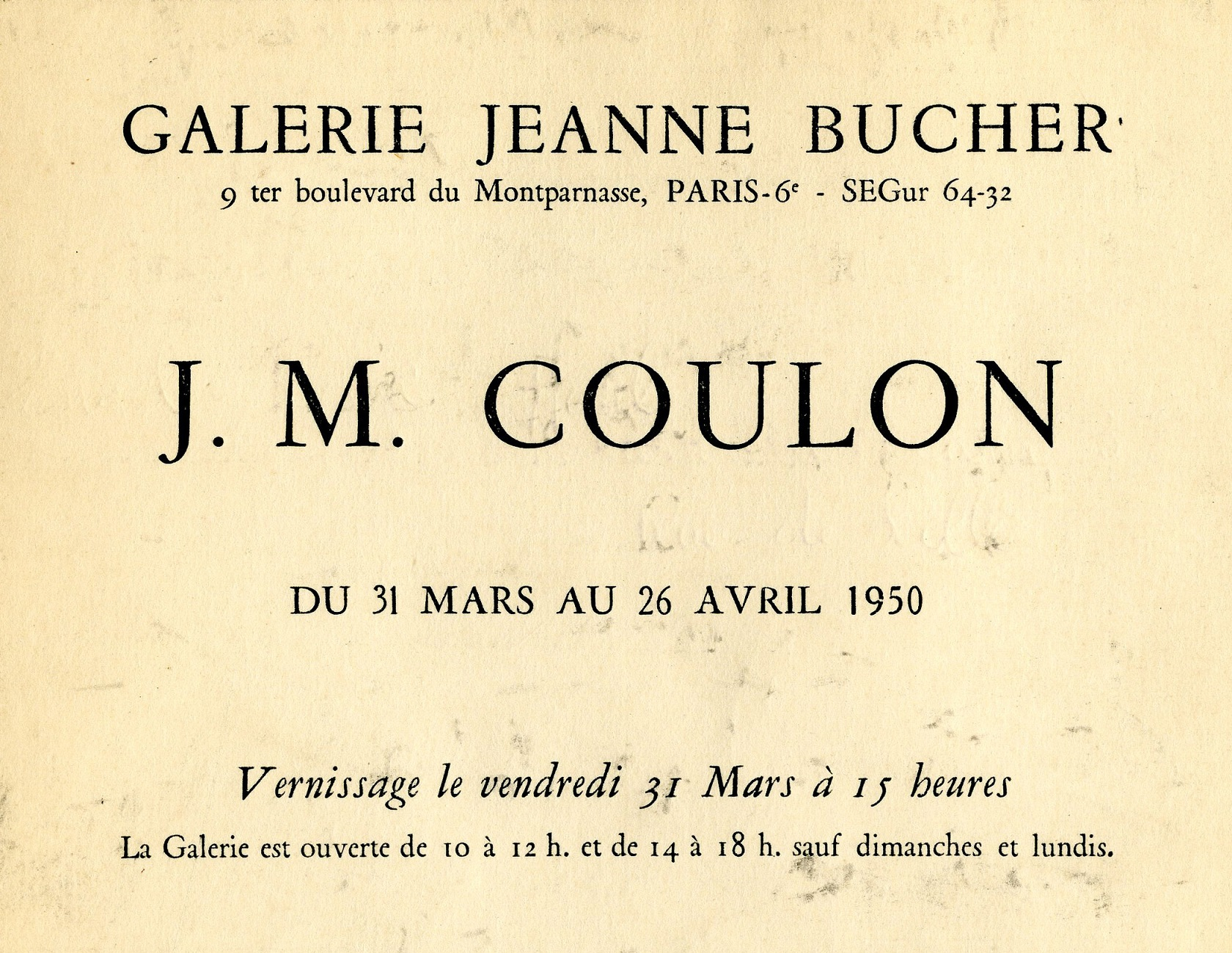
Invitation card to Coulon's exhibit (1950)

He exhibited alone at the Galerie Jeanne Bucher in 1950. The guest book shows signatures of many famous people. He took part in a group exhibit in New York, at the Sidney Janis gallery. He spent three months at the Maison Descartes, in Amsterdam, having won a scholarship from the French Government. He became familiar with the Dutch classic painters and learned Dutch.

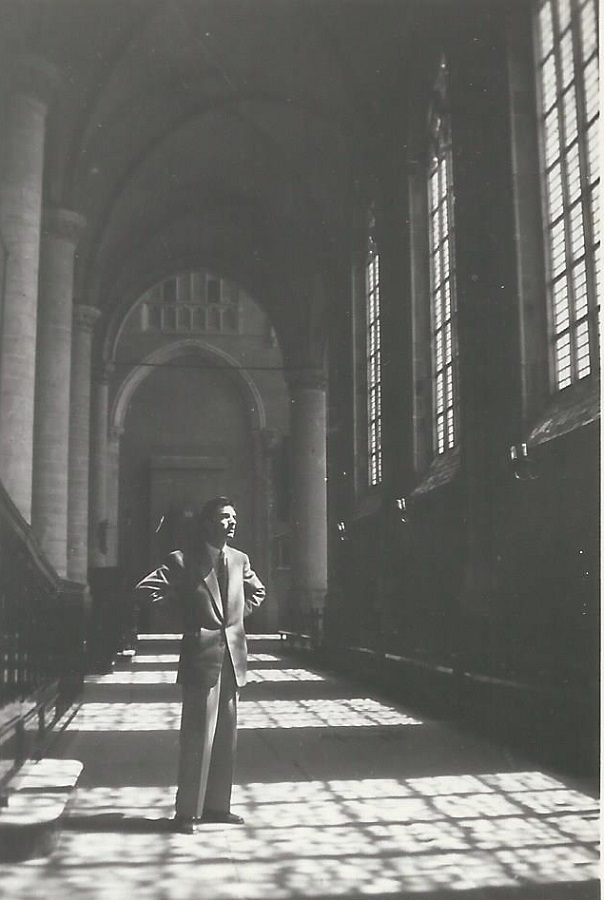
Coulon visiting St Peter Church in Leiden (1950)

In 1952, his other younger brother, Jean-François – a 25-year-old officer in the French Air Force – crashed in a plane during a mission in Tunisia.

He married Caroline Garabedian in 1953. His house and studio in Saint-Jean de Braye, near Orléans, burned down in a fire in 1955. A great number of paintings were lost.

In the following year he spent two months in the US, where he visited the huge cities and was fascinated by New York. This first visit was the first of a long series of trips which provided inspiration for his painting.

In 1957 his only daughter was born.

In 1968, after France got out of the integrated NATO command, he moved to Brussels with his wife who worked at the American mission to NATO. They remained there until 1998. From Brussels, the family traveled across Europe by car in all directions, with trips to cultural and artistic sights. He took the car alone, sometimes, and left to explore some European countries, spending the night with local inhabitants, asking people to open very confidential illuminated archives or drawings kept out of the light.

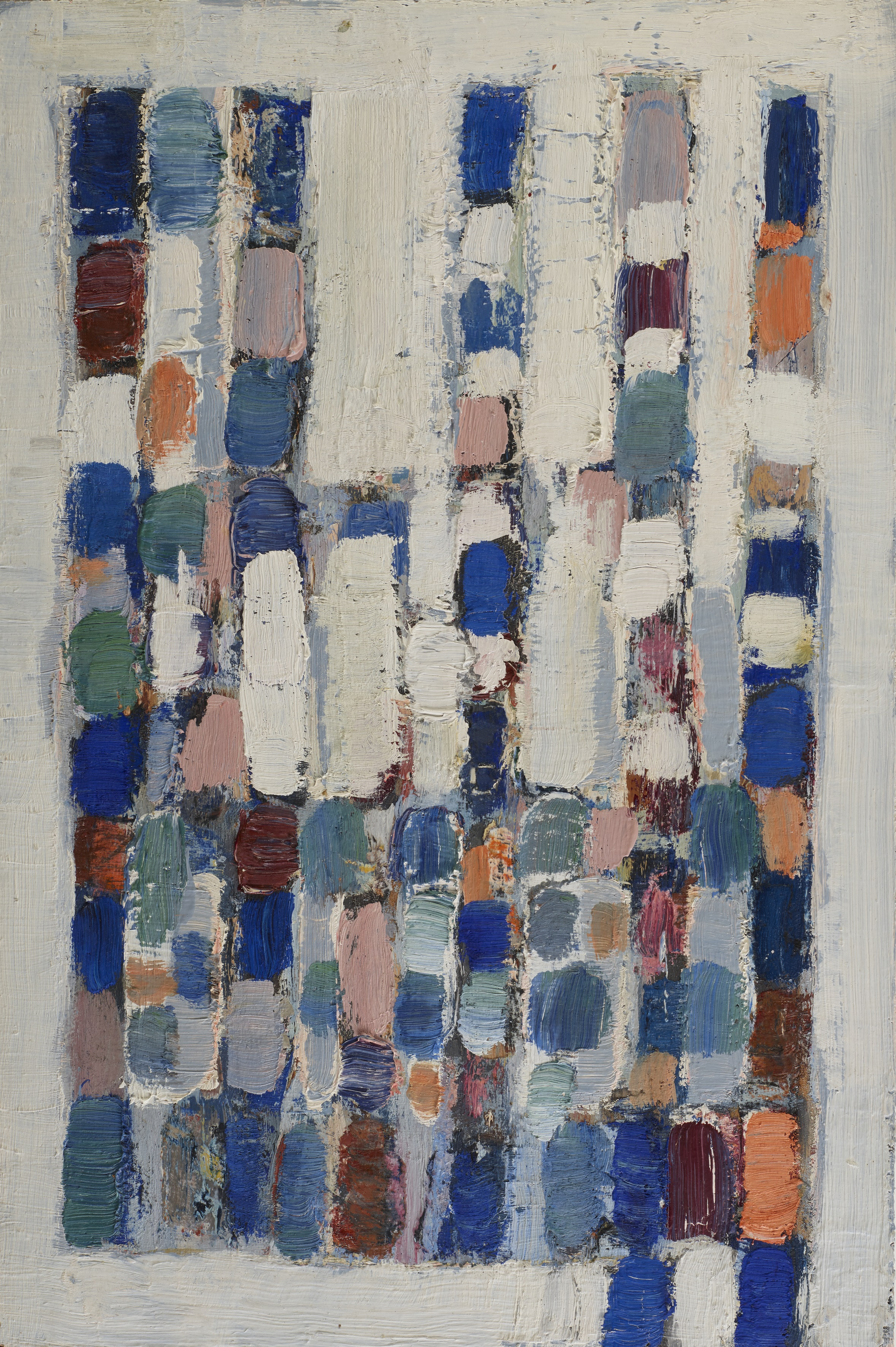
Composition by Jean-Michel Coulon, 1960s

His 1971 exhibit in Brussels at the Regency gallery organized by Michel Vockaer was a success. Eighteen paintings were sold. There was supposed to be a series of three shows. Only the first was held. Coulon preferred to use the excuse of never being ready for the next series of paintings.

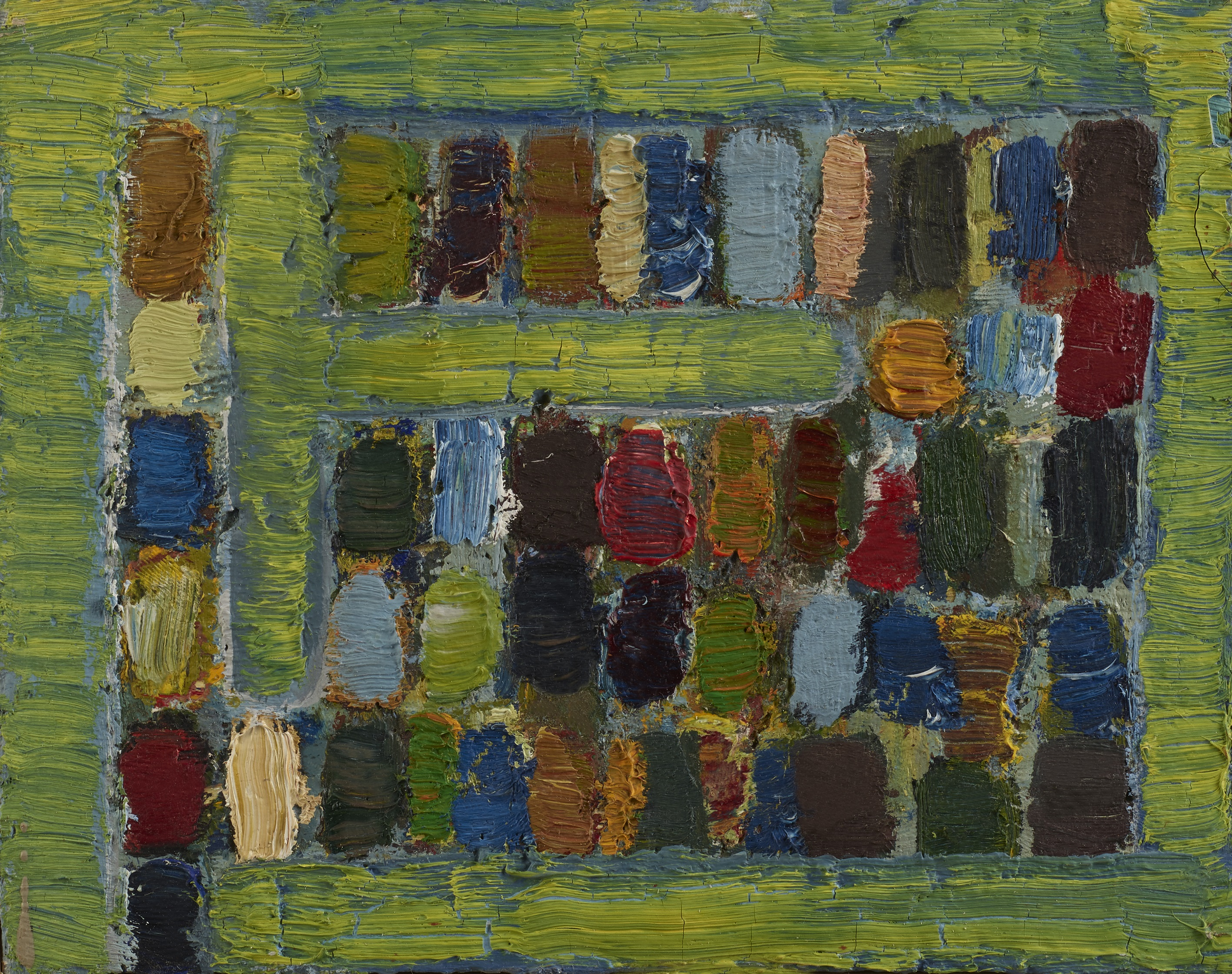
"Composition" Jean-Michel Coulon, 1970s

In 1999 he returned to live in Paris in the 16th arrondissement with a nearby studio where he worked every afternoon. He did not renew close contacts with the Paris galleries. He remained discreet, almost hidden. His work went from painting to collages, which were done on oil paintings dating from the 1950s and 1960s.

In 2012 his health declined and after a long hospital stay he began using a wheelchair. Going back and forth to the studio was no longer possible, so it remained untouched until his death. He composed collages in his apartment on sheets of heavy drawing paper. His spirit remaining intelligent and lively up to the end, he was working to the very last days, still with warm and bright colors.

Coulon died on October 25, 2014, at the age of 94. He is buried in Saint-Georges-de-Didonne (Charente-Maritime), with the generations of Coulons.

== Description of the work ==
Coulon painted in the greatest secrecy until his death at the end of 2014; he did not let anyone enter his studio and he never showed his painting, even to his relatives.

Around 1,000 works were discovered the day after his death at the opening of his studio. Because he had lost the use of his legs, he had not been able to work there for several years.

Due to its recent discovery and the absence of comments left by the artist, the overall vision of Coulon's work is being considered and subject to discussion.

The main points of reflection concern in particular:

- The positioning of Coulon in the art history of the 20th century and comparing him to the painters he was close to after the Second World War (Nicolas de Staël, Maria Helena Vieira da Silva, André Lanskoy and Olivier Debré, among others),
- The evolution of his style (forms, colors, material) during the 70 years of his life as an artist,
- The impact of the dramas of his life on his artistic choices, including the brutal death of his two brothers in 1944 and 1952 and the burning of his house and some of his works in 1955,
- The secret that surrounded his artistic approach,
- The opportunity to search for a key to understanding his work in letters he wrote during his travels, particularly to the United States and Italy, which have now been published with a foreword by Annie Cohen-Solal.

The art historian Lydia Harambourg proposed some answers in a first monograph of Coulon published in June 2018.

The evolution of the work can be schematically illustrated as follows:

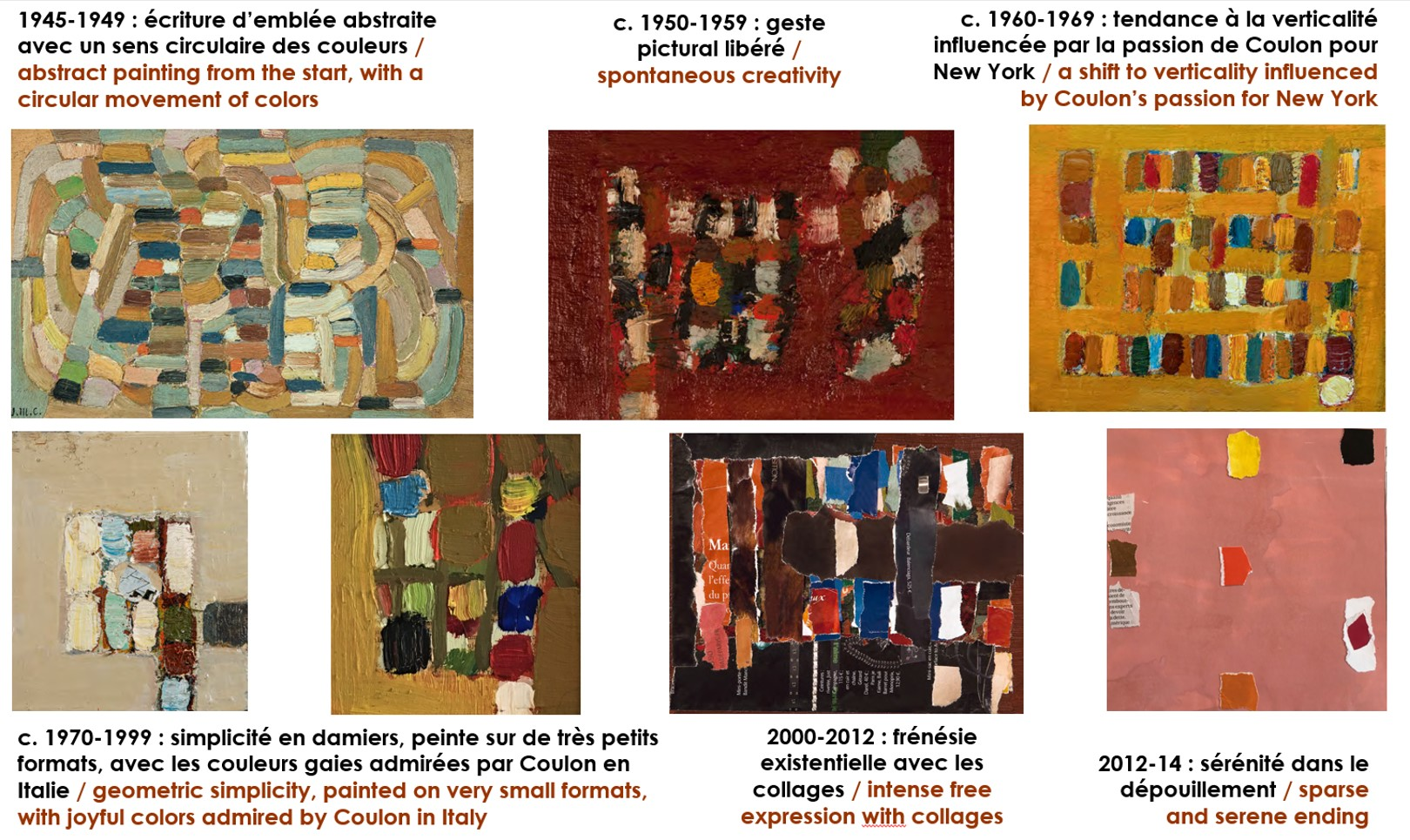

== Exhibitions ==
Exhibitions during Coulon's lifetime:

- 1949 : Group exhibition at Jeanne Bucher Gallery, Paris
- 1950 : Exhibition at Jeanne Bucher Gallery, Paris
- 1950 : Group exhibition called "Young Painters from the US and France" at Sidney Janis Gallery, New York, with Nicolas de Staël, Mark Rothko, André Lanskoy, Pierre Soulages, Jean Dubuffet, Jackson Pollock among others.
- 1952 : Participates in the exhibition Posters by Painters and Sculptors at the Museum of Modern Art (MoMa), New York, USA
- 1971 : Exhibition at Régence Gallery, Brussels, Belgium

Posthumous exhibits:

- 2018 : Exhibition Jean-Michel Coulon at Dutko Gallery, Paris, rue Bonaparte, France.
- 2019 : Exhibition Une vie pour la peinture at Maison des Arts de Châtillon, France.
- 2019 : Exhibition Jean-Michel Coulon, 70 years of painting at Laurentin Gallery, Brussels, Belgium.
- 2019 : Group exhibition A Century of Collage at Rosenberg & Co gallery, New York, USA
- 2020 : Group exhibition Couleur-Lumière at Galerie 50, La Cadière d’Azur, France
- 2021 : Group exhibition Summer Show at galerie Dutko, Paris, France
- 2021 : Group exhibition Quatre Peintres Abstraits de l’Après-Guerre at galerie Luz 26, Saint-Jean de Luz, France
- 2021 : Group exhibition Petits Formats at the Galerie 50, La Cadière d’Azur, France
- 2021 : Group exhibition Collages des Années 50 aux Années 2000 at galerie Luz 26, Saint-Jean de Luz, France
- 2022 : Exhibition at Galerie 50, La Cadière d'Azur, France
- 2023 : Group exhibition La Seconde Ecole de Paris at galerie Luz 26, Saint-Jean de Luz, France
- 2023 : Group exhibition at Fine Art la Biennale (FAB) - Paris, France, Françoise Livinec gallery
- 2024 : Jean-Michel Coulon, l'appel de la lumière, Protestant Museum, Ferrières, Tarn, France
- 2025 : Group exhibition at Salon du Dessin - Paris, France, Laurentin gallery
- 2025 : Group exhibition at Fine Art la Biennale (FAB) - Paris, France, Laurentin gallery

== Gallery ==
Compositions by Jean-Michel Coulon

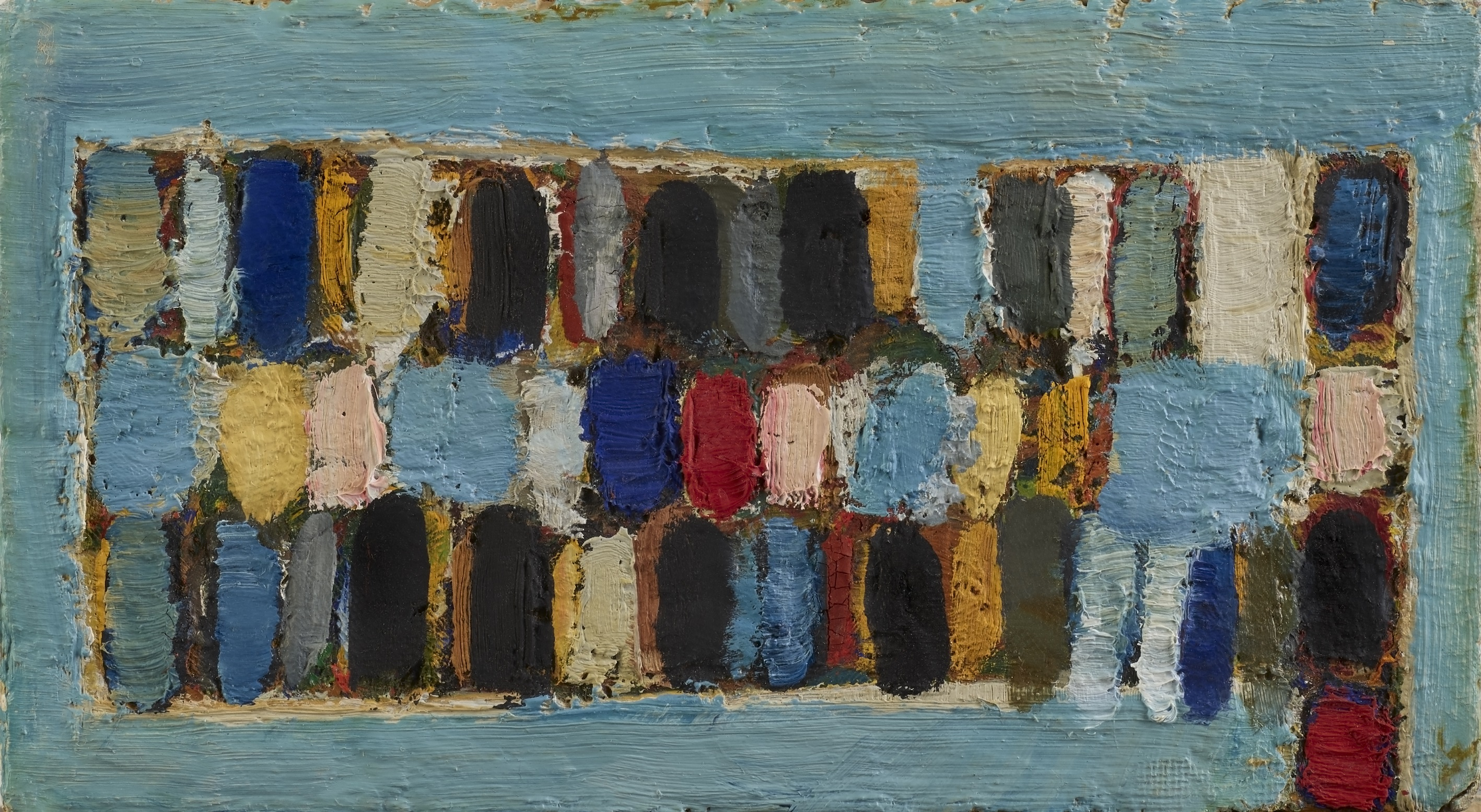
"Composition" Jean-Michel Coulon, 1970s.

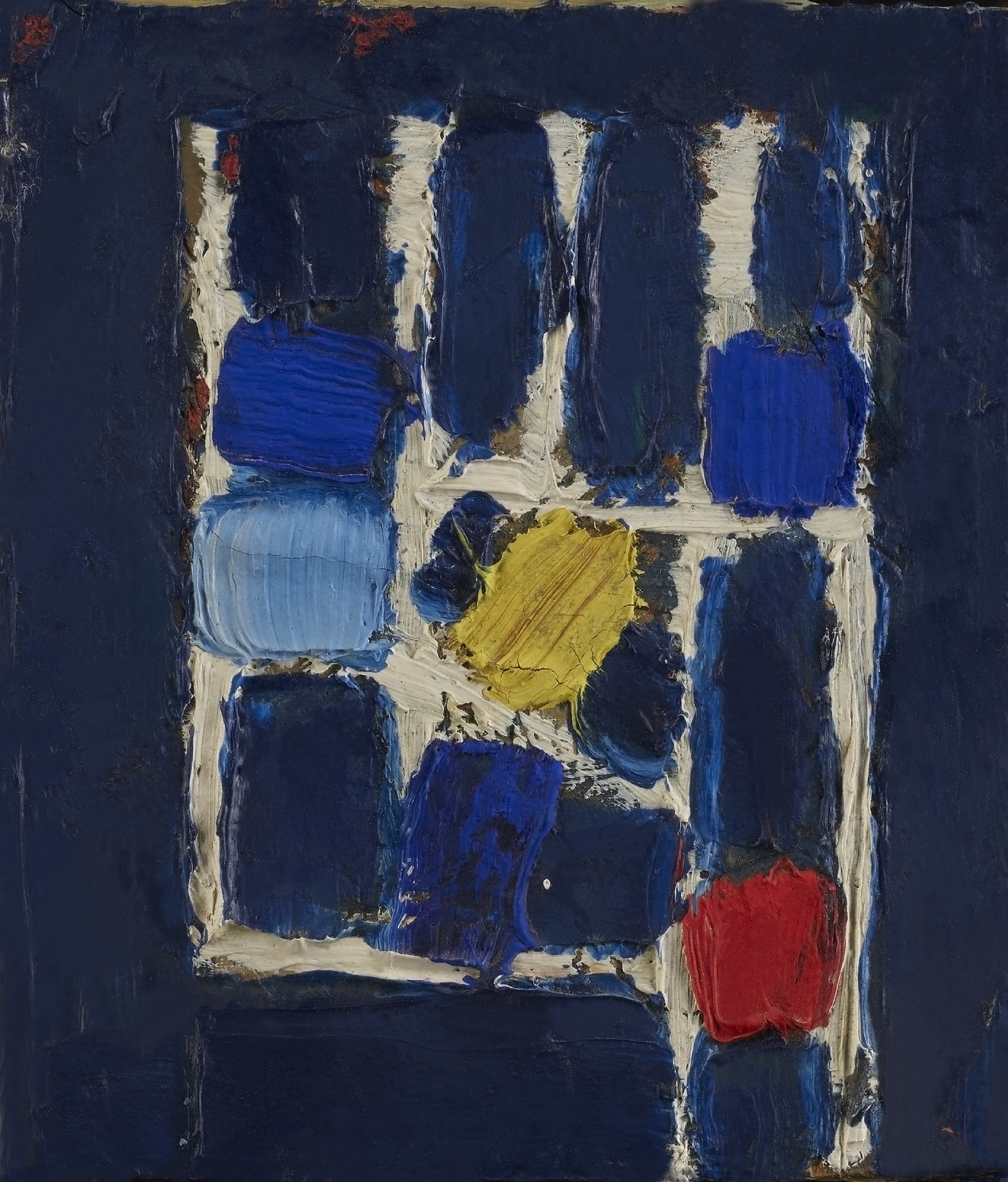
"Composition" Jean-Michel Coulon, 1970s.

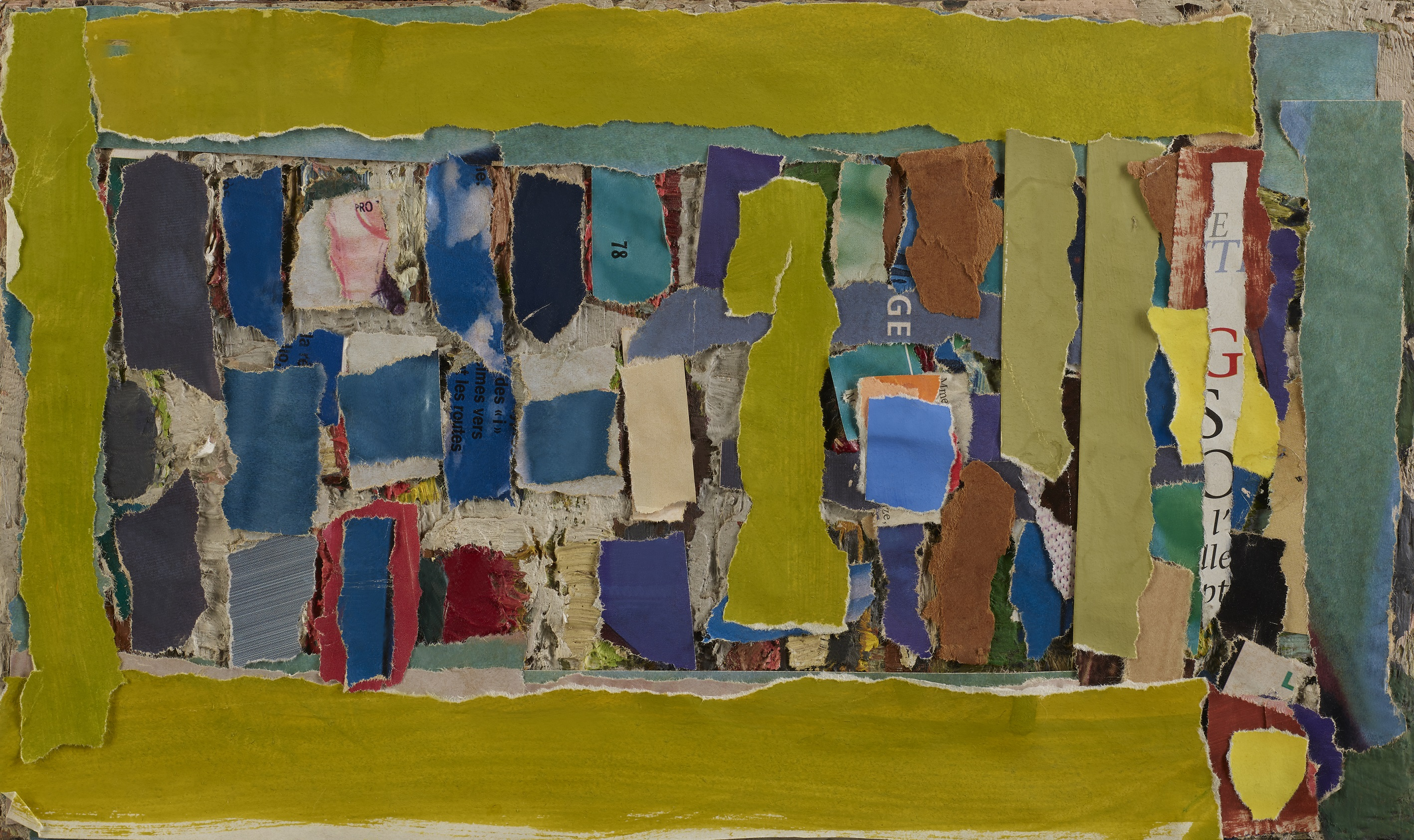
"Collage" by Jean-Michel Coulon, 2000s

== Works in collections ==
According to the classification in the catalogue raisonné

=== France ===
- Musée National d'Art Moderne, Paris, 2022 : 0036H, 0824G, 0826G, 0837G and 0844G. https://grandpalaisrmn.fr/
- Musée du protestantisme, de la Réforme à la laïcité, Ferrières, Tarn, 2025 : 0279H.
- André Malraux Museum of Modern Art (MuMa), Le Havre, 2025 : 0840G, 0841G and 0848G.

== Bibliography ==
- Lydia Harambourg: Jean-Michel Coulon, (Gourcuff Gradenigo, 2018)
- Foreword by Annie Cohen-Solal, Lettres d'Amérique, (Gourcuff Gradenigo, 2019)
- Foreword by Annie Cohen-Solal, Lettres d'Italie, (Gourcuff Gradenigo, 2019)
- Paul Baquiast: Une dynastie de la bourgeoisie républicaine, les Pelletan (L'Harmattan, 1996)
- Aline Stalla-Bourdillon, Jean-Michel Coulon (1920-2014), Catalogue raisonné in three volumes (Gourcuff Gradenigo, 2022)
- Patrick Cabanel, Patrice de Ginestet, Aline Stalla-Bourdillon, Jean-Michel Coulon, l'appel de la lumière (Gourcuff Gradenigo, 2024)
