= Colleen (disambiguation) =

Colleen is an Irish feminine given name anglicised from Cailín meaning girl.

Colleen may also refer to:

== Entertainment ==
- Colleen (1927 film), a 1927 comedy film starring Madge Bellamy
- Colleen (1936 film), a 1936 Warner Bros. musical
- Colleen (musician), electronic music composer Cécile Schott (born 1976)
- Colleen (album), a 1983 release by Colleen Hewett
- Colleen (song), by the band The Heavy
- "Colleen," a song from the EP Joanna Newsom and the Ys Street Band by Joanna Newsom
- "Colleen," a song from the album Living with the Living by Ted Leo and the Pharmacists
- "Colleen", a song by Griffin House (musician), from his 2013 album Balls

== Ships and boats ==
- HMS Colleen, two ships of Britain's Royal Navy
- Colleen Class, a sailing boat once raced in Dublin Bay
- Colleen (rowboat), a rowboat used on Okanagan Lake in Canada

== Other uses ==
- Colleen, Virginia, an unincorporated community in Nelson County
- Chicago Colleens, a former baseball team in the All-American Girls Professional Baseball League
- Colleen, the design code name for the Atari 800 computer
- List of storms named Colleen
