= Coulon =

Coulon may refer to:

- Coulon (surname)
- Coulon, alternative name for the river Calavon, in the Vaucluse department, France
- Coulon, Deux-Sèvres, a commune of the Deux-Sèvres department, France
- Coulon, former commune of the Cher department, now part of Graçay
- Coulon, former commune of the Ille-et-Vilaine department, now part of Montfort-sur-Meu
