= Colen =

Colen is a surname and given name.

Notable people with this name include:

== Surname ==
- Alexandra Colen (born 1955), Belgian politician
- Beatrice Colen (1948–1999), American actress
- Dan Colen (born 1979), American artist
- Kimberly Colen (1957–2001), American author

== Given name ==
- Colen Campbell (1676–1729), Scottish architect
- Colen Ferguson, American politician

== Other ==
- Colen Donck, Dutch-American estate in New York

== See also ==
- Coolen
- Coleen (disambiguation)
