= Catherine Zoubtchenko =

French artist (born 1937)

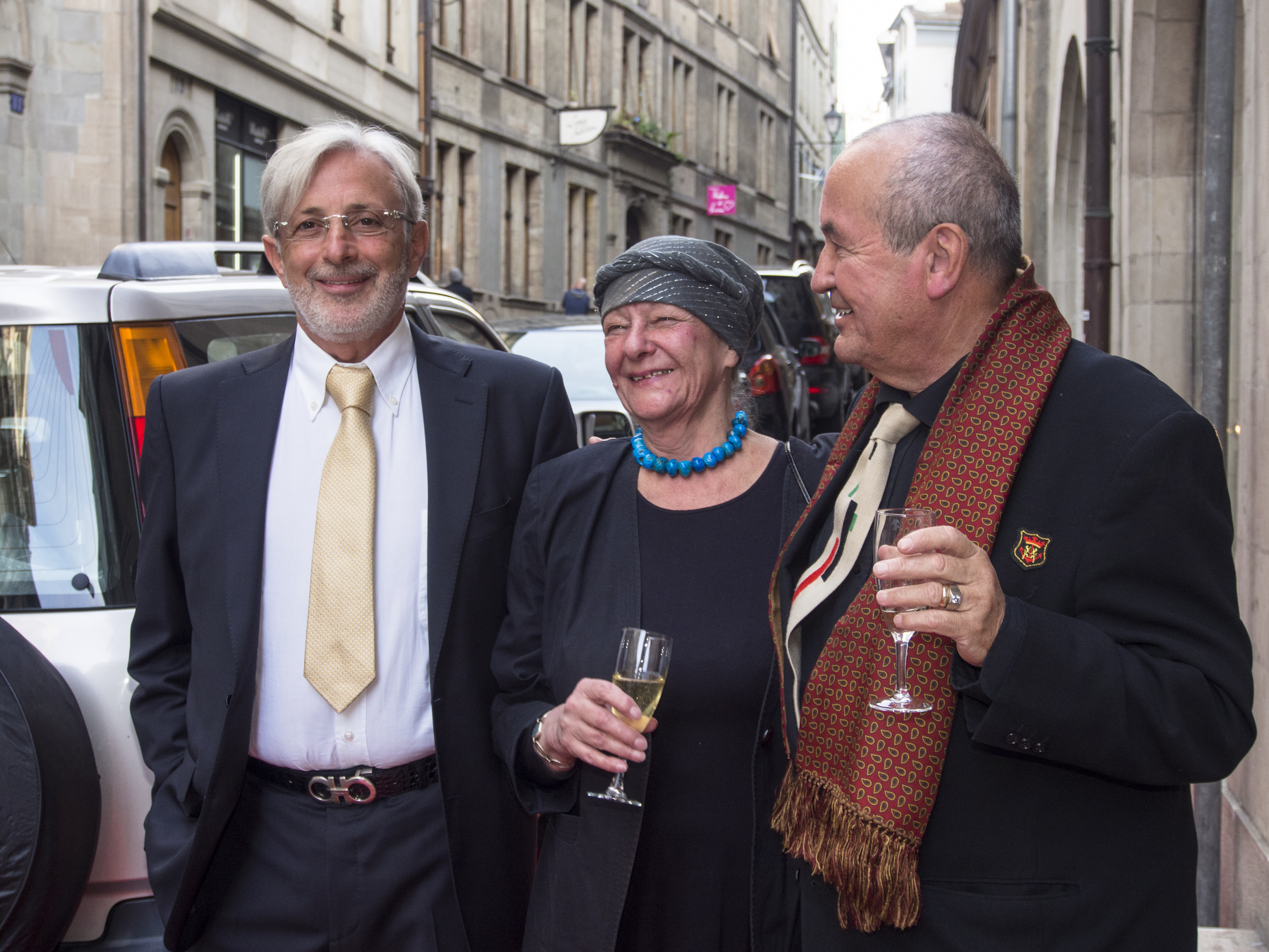
- Born: 1937 (age 88–89); Leningrad
- Occupation: Artist

Catherine Zoubtchenko (born in 1937) is a Russian-born French artist most well known for her abstract style of painting. She was born in Leningrad, Russia, and was deported along with her parents to Berlin in 1941 by Nazi Germany. She moved to Paris in 1954 where she started her life as an artist. Zoubtchenko's work has been circulating in the art market for some time. According to Artnet, she has had paintings sold at Auction as early as 1989. Her paintings usually sell for upwards of €6,000 and even up to €20,000. Her work has been commented upon by Jean-Claude Marcadé and exposed in numerous galleries and museums throughout Europe (especially within France and Russia).

Catherine Zoubtchenko is still active and continues to paint in her studio in Paris.

== Education ==
Catherine Zoubtchenko studied in both the Académie de la Grande Chaumière and Académie Julian between 1954 and 1955. In summer 1958 (at the age of 21) she became the sole pupil of André Lanskoy. Catherine Zoubtchenko worked and lived with Lanskoy for the rest of his life, until death in 1976.

== Art-Style ==
Typically using gouache or water colours, Catherine Zoubtchenko paints non-figurative abstract works of art.

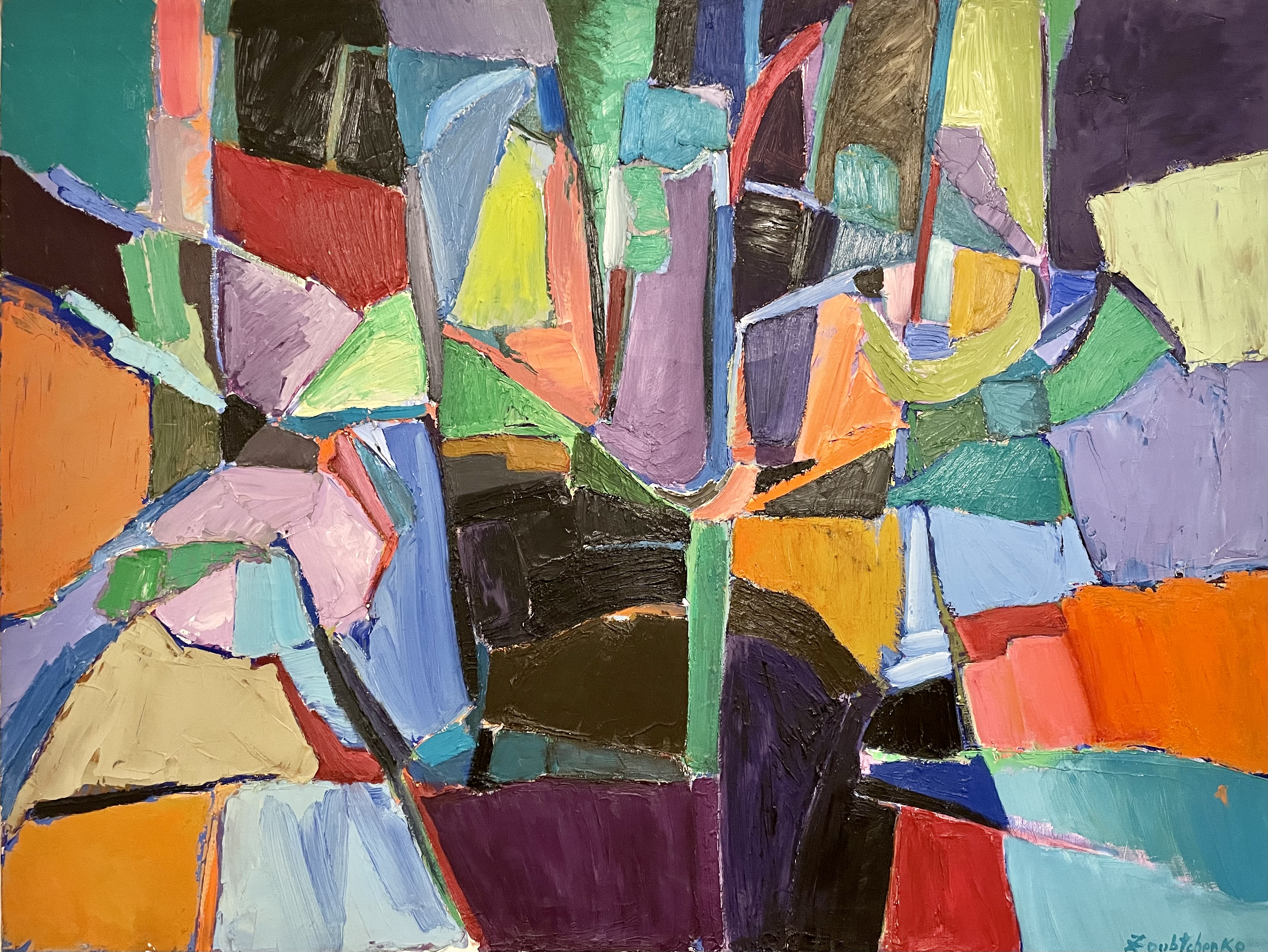
Dilemma, 1966, Technique: oil on canvas, 97 x 130 cm

== Exhibitions ==
=== Personal exhibitions ===
- Galerie Jacques MASSOL, Paris, 1972
- Restaurant-théâtre Au bec fin, Paris, 1980
- Galerie LA GALÉE, Hollande, 1981
- Centre culturel de Meudon, France, 1982
- Union de Banques à Paris : inauguration de l'agence des Champs-Elysées, 1984
- Galerie TAYLOR, Paris, 1986
- Galerie Verriere, Lyon, 1987
- Galerie Michel Guinle-La Main, Lyon, 1989
- Galerie Marie-Thérèse Wagner, Thionville, 1991
- Galerie "Am Stadtplatz, Aarberg, Suisse, 1992
- Restaurant "Léonidas", Paris, 1997

=== Museums that Exposed Her Work ===
- National Russian Museum, St. Petersburg, Russia
- Fine Art Museum, Bordeaux, France
- The State Tretyakov Gallery, Moscow, Russia
- Fine Art Museum, Lille, France
