= Olivier Debré =

French painter (1920–1999)

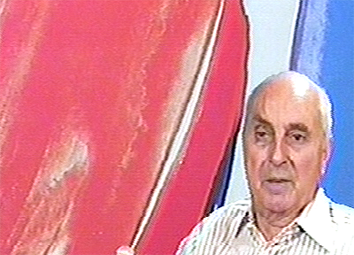
Olivier Debré in 1995

Olivier Debré (14 April 1920 – 1 June 1999) was a French abstract painter.

== Biography ==
It was following a visit to Pablo Picasso’s studio in 1941 that Olivier Debré, an honoured artist and member of the French Academy, moved from figurative painting to abstraction, and the influence of André Lanskoy that awakened his marked fondness for colour.

A major painter of colour fields of the Post-War period, this painter described his painting as "fervent abstraction" because it arouses emotions, emotion incarnated by him by the sign.

"I really tried to find how within a sign and without using conventions, I could express something without using illustration either." Olivier Debré

After the majestic Signes-figures of the 1950s using a subdued palette and matter, the Signes-paysages from the 1960s appeared where the matter stretches, becomes fluid allowing light and transparency to emerge.

Olivier Debré’s work has taken shape in large scale stage sets: curtains for the Comédie Française (1987), for the Hong Kong Opera (1989) requested by the foundation Louis Vuitton, and for the new Shanghai Opera House.

"When I paint on the ground, there is a physical adherence that is sensual, almost sexual." Olivier Debré

The painter's work has also been the subject of a fantastic contemporary ballet: Signes directed by the choreographer Carolyn Carlson. A unique performance that associates painting, music and dance, presented at the Bastille Opera in Paris in 1997 and performed again in July 2013.

== Collections ==
Olivier Debré's works are collected all over the world, in the major international museums such as the Centre Pompidou in Paris, the Musée d'Histoire et d'Art de Luxembourg, The Phillips Collection in Washington, the Taipei Fine Arts Museum, as well as in private collections and famous foundations such as the Fondation Gandur pour l'Art in Geneva.

The planned Fondation Olivier Debré is due to open on the site of the Tours art school.

== Major exhibitions ==
Olivier Debré. Retrospective, Jeu de Paume, Paris, 1995

Olivier Debré. Retrospective, Art Museum, Reykjavik, 1996

Olivier Debré. Retrospective, Museum of Fine Arts, Mexico / Modern Art Museum, Rio de Janeiro, 1997

Olivier Debré. Retrospective, History Museum, Beijing/ Modern Art Museum, Hong-Kong, 1998

Olivier Debré, œuvres de la dation, Centre Pompidou, Paris 25/06/2003-15/09/2003

Olivier Debré, un abstrait lyrique, retrospective of the artist, Musée d’Ixelles (Belgium) 24/02/2011-15/05/2011

Les Sujets de l’abstraction, Peinture non-figurative de la Seconde École de Paris (1946-1962), Fondation Gandur pour l’Art, Musée Rath, Geneva, 06/05/2011-14/08/2011

Signes, ballet directed by the choreographer Carolyn Carlson, with music by René Aubry; stage sets and costumes by Olivier Debré, Opéra Bastille in Paris, July 2013

Olivier Debré, Fervent Abstraction, Estorick Collection, London, 30/06/2021-26/09/2021

== Works ==
- Espace thought, espace believes, Olivier Debré (1999).
- Olivier Debré, by Olivier Debré and Pernoud Emmanuel (1995).
- L'espace et le comportement, by Olivier Debré (1990).
- l'oeuf dans le chocolat, by Olivier Debré (1997).
- La marche de Mme Ouvrard, by Olivier Debré (1996).
