= Cailín =

Cailín (Irish "girl") may refer to:

- A variant of the feminine name Colleen
- Cailin, Meichuan, a village in Meichuan, Wuxue, Huanggang, China

== Music ==
- Cailin (song), by Unwritten Law
- Cailín Óg a Stór (Irish: "O Darling Young Girl") traditional Irish melody
- "Cailín na gruaige doinne" (The Brown-Haired Girl) The Chieftains (album)
