= André Lanskoy =

French painter

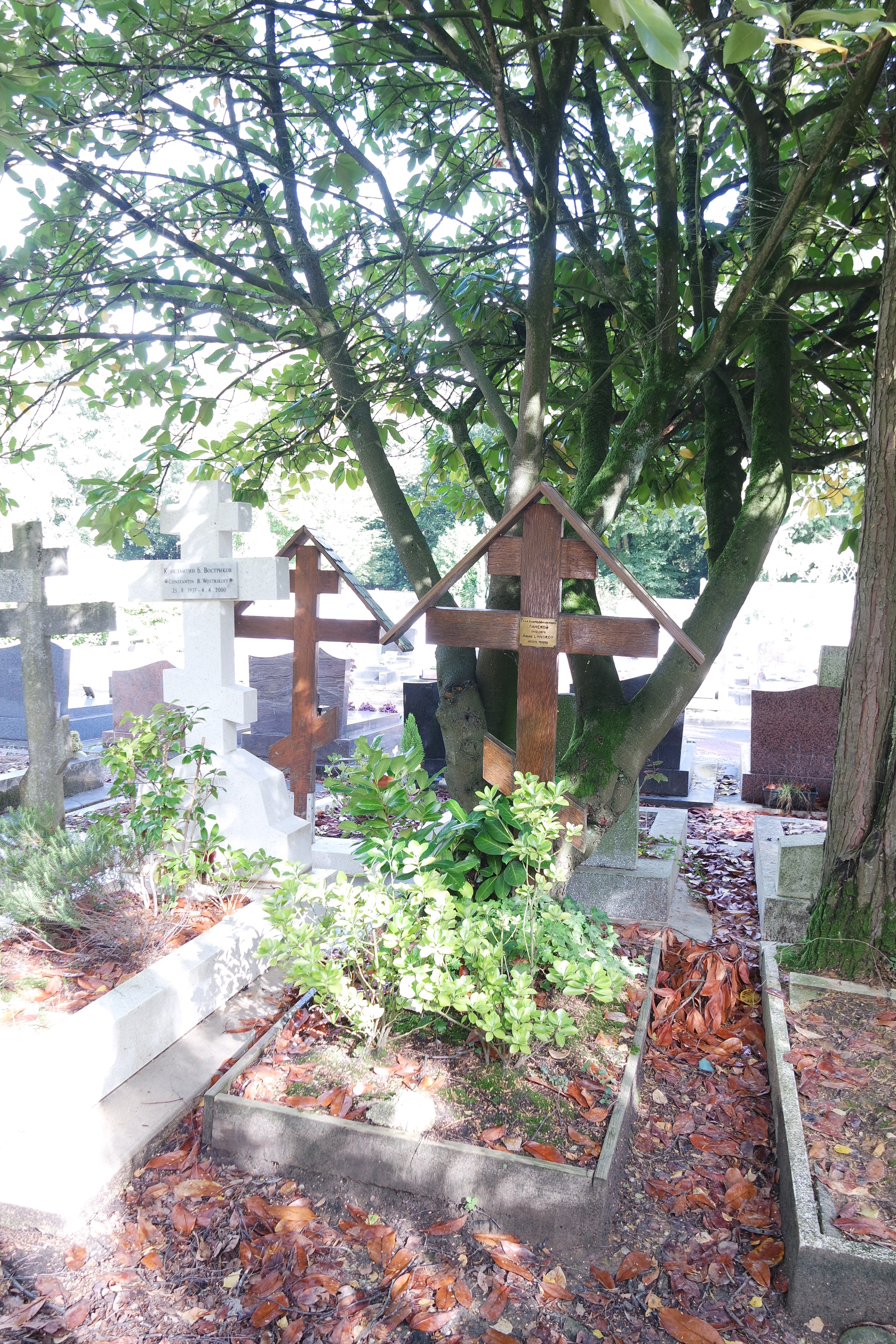
- Born: March 13, 1902; Moscow
- Died: August 24, 1976 (aged 74); Paris
- Known for: Painter and printmaker
- Style: Abstract
- Movement: Tachisme

André Lanskoy (Russian: Андре́й Миха́йлович Ланско́й; 31 March 1902 – 24 August 1976) was a Russian painter and printmaker who worked in France. He is associated with the School of Paris and Tachisme, an abstract painting movement that began during the 1940s.

== Biography ==
He was born in Moscow. After 1905, the family moved to St. Petersburg, the capital in 1909. In 1918, he moved to Kiev where he painted his first paintings. During the Russian Civil War he fought in the White Army. After an injury he moved to Constantinople and in 1921, he went to Paris. Recalling his arrival in the French capital, Lanskoy said: "Literally in the first night I started to paint and I haven’t stopped since." In Paris, he met Serge Poliakoff, Jean-Michel Coulon and later Nicolas de Staël. In Paris, Lanskoy also met Catherine Zoubtchenko, who became his muse and lover.

Lanskoy spent a lot of time at museums and was influenced by James Ensor’s and Vincent van Gogh’s use of color. In 1923, he participated in his first group exhibitions of Russian painters at the La Licorne Gallery in Paris. Wilhelm Uhde discovered Lanskoy’s paintings at the Salon d'Automne in 1924 and became a collector of his works in the years that followed. In 1925, Lanskoy had a solo exhibition and his works were acquired by museums and important private collectors. After 1937, his paintings began a transition towards abstraction and he studied both Paul Klee and Wassily Kandinsky.

After 1942, he painted only abstract works. The interaction of form and color became the major theme running through his oeuvre: "Even though every brushstroke represents for itself a transformed reality, it receives its true meaning in the context of surrounding shades of color." In 1944, Lanskoy exhibited at the Jeanne Bucher Gallery in Paris where he met Nicolas de Staël. In 1948, he showed at the Louis Carré Gallery and in 1951 at the Galerie Jacques Dubourg. The Tooth and Sons Gallery showed his work in 1953 and The Loeb Gallery in New York City followed in 1959. In 1962, he began to work on a large project of original prints and collages to accompany Nikolai Gogol’s novel Diary of a Madman. He worked for fourteen years until his death on this project resulting in 150 collages and 80 lithographs. In 1966 he had an exhibition at the Museé Galliéra, Paris. The Neue Galerie in Zürich held an exhibition in 1969. Lanskoy died on 24 August 1976 in Paris. The Aras Gallery collected the extensive Diary of a Madman series of prints and staged a major posthumous exhibition in 1989.
