= Coole =

Coole may refer to:

- Coole River, a tributary of the Marne river, France
- Coole, Marne, a commune in the Marne department, France
- Coole, County Westmeath, a village in Ireland
- Coole, County Cork, a village and civil parish in Ireland
- Coole, County Antrim, a townland in County Antrim, Northern Ireland
- Coole, County Tyrone, a townland in County Tyrone, Northern Ireland
- Coole (barony), a barony in County Fermanagh, Northern Ireland
- Coole Park, a nature reserve in County Galway, Ireland
- "The Wild Swans at Coole", a poem by W. B. Yeats
