= Annie Cohen-Solal =

French academic (born 1948)

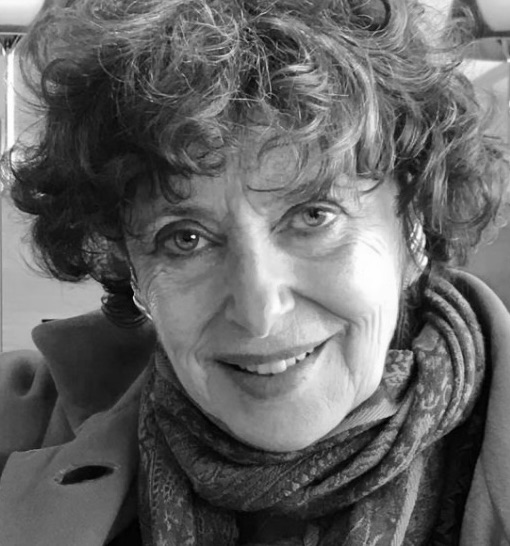
- Annie Cohen-Solal
- Born: Algiers
- Awards: 2009 Légion d'Honneur 2000 Prix Bernier prize of Académie des Beaux-Arts; 2010 ArtCurial prize for the best contemporary art book 2021 Prix Femina prize for best essay 2022 Prix Historia pour l’exposition Picasso l’étranger
- Scientific career
- Workplaces: Bocconi University Université de Caen; Tisch School of Art (NYU); EHESS-Paris; ENS-Paris; Hebrew University of Jerusalem Cultural Counselor to the French Embassy in the USA Freie Universität Berlin
- Website: https://anniecohensolal.com/sitev2/en/

Annie Cohen-Solal is a writer, historian, cultural diplomat and public intellectual with a career spanning over four decades. Born in Algiers, in a Jewish family of Mediterranean origin, she faced geographical displacement and devoted her career to issues of migration and creation. Cohen-Solal is the award-winning author of such books as, Sartre: 1905-1980, Leo & His Circle: the Life of Leo Castelli (Prix ArtCurial 2010) and A Foreigner Called Picasso (Prix Femina 2021). Her books, exhibitions, and lectures have been covered both by academic reviews and by the press at large.

== Life ==
Born in Algeria, Annie Cohen-Solal lived in numerous countries and speaks numerous languages.

As an academic, she held positions at the Freie Universität Berlin, Hebrew University of Jerusalem, Tisch School of Art (NYU), École des Hautes Études en Sciences Sociales, University of Caen (Basse-Normandie), École Normale supérieure in Paris. She is currently Distinguished Professor at Bocconi University in Milan (Department of Social and Political Sciences). Since her earliest projects as a scholar, Annie has been borrowing techniques from ethnography and anthropology, combining them with traditional historical archival research – mostly in intercultural contexts.

As a writer, after her PhD Paul Nizan communiste impossible, 1980 (with Professor Annie Krigel), Cohen-Solal was commissioned by André Schiffrin (Pantheon Books, New York) to write the first biography of Jean-Paul Sartre. Published in 1985, this book was translated into sixteen languages. On the occasion of Sartre's centenary in 2005, her international lecture tour took her to Brazil, where she and Gilberto Gil considered the creation of a Sartre Chair at the University of Brasilia. She then co-directed the organization of the Sartre Night at the ENS, involving students and researchers as philosophers, historians and geographers, and led a research seminar "Geopolitics of Sartre" (2013). In July 2023, Cohen-Solal was asked to give the keynote address for the Sartre UK Society at Oxford. Her lecture “Who’s Still Afraid of Sartre?” developed some of the issues from her Tribune published earlier in Le Monde.

As Cultural Counselor to the French Embassy in the United States in residence in New York (1989-1993), Cohen-Solal tackled numerous fields, managed to get Ariane Mnouchkine's Les Atrides to BAM, and created the first French interdisciplinary academic program across the US "centres d'excellence". In June 2009, at the French Consulate in New York, she was presented with the title of Chevalier dans l'ordre national de la Légion d'Honneur, the highest decoration in France, by Ambassador Pierre Vimont.

In New York again, Cohen-Solal's first encounter with Leo Castelli led her to shift her interest from European intellectuals to agents of the art world. In the frame of a manyfold project which was to become a social history of the US artist, she published Painting American (2001) and Leo & His Circle: The Life of Leo Castelli (2010). She also published New York-Mid Century (2014), with Paul Goldberger and Robert Gottlieb; and Mark Rothko: Toward the Light in the Chapel (2014). By adopting the historical perspective of the longue durée and developing a multiscalar analysis of configurations, Cohen-Solal highlighted the various networks of agents who made possible the empowerment of the artist in the US as well as the shift of the art world to the US. In 2001, she produced a 25 programs-series for France-Culture: From Frederic Church to Jackson Pollock, the Heroic March of American Painters. She joined the jury of the Latvian Architecture Award in Riga (2015) and that of the Evens Art Prize in Antwerp (2016). Annie Cohen-Solal is also a trustee of Paris College of Art (since 2015).

As part of her research on art, artists, intellectual and social circulations, she was commissioned by the Yale University Press to write Mark Rothko: toward the Light in the Chapel, translated into six languages. Following the social and geographical trajectory of the painter, her book reveals how this Jewish child who immigrated to the United States at age ten, became a true agent of transformation of the country, managing to integrate the different cultural areas to which he belonged, notably in the Rothko Chapel (Houston, Texas) commissioned by the de Menil family and inaugurated in 1971.

In 2014, Annie Cohen-Solal was appointed general curator of the exhibition Magiciens de la terre: retour sur une exposition légendaire, for which she also published the catalogue along with Jean-Hubert Martin. Presented at the Centre Georges-Pompidou, this exhibition was a critical re-reading of the original 1989 event, Magiciens de la terre, curated by Jean-Hubert Martin as general commissioner. That landmark show marked a turning point in the French art scene by giving unprecedented visibility to many contemporary non-Western artists who had until then been excluded from European museum circuits. The 2014 initiative underscored the pioneering role of the 1989 edition and offered a reflection on the breaking down of disciplinary boundaries, incorporating tools from anthropological and sociocultural analysis into the museum context.

In 2015, along with historian Jeremy Adelman (Princeton University), she became co-director of "Crossing Boundaries", a research group at CASBS (Center for Advanced Behavioral Studies), Stanford University.

Following her global vision of artistic flows, the Maeght Foundation in Saint Paul de Vence entrusted her with the essay for the catalogue Christo and Jeanne-Claude: Barrels, published in 2016.

Her latest book Un étranger nommé Picasso (Prix Femina Essai, Fayard, 2021; Gallimard Folio, 2023) was published in English by Farrar, Straus & Giroux (2023, USA and English-speaking world), in Spanish by Paidós (2023, Spain and Spanish-speaking world), and in Polish by Znak Koncept (2023). In 2024, the Italian edition was published by Marsilio, and received the Book of the Year 2024 award from Giornale dell’Arte.

Inspired by her book, Cohen-Solal curated the exhibition Picasso l'étranger for the Musée national de l'Histoire de l'Immigration de la Porte Dorée, in partnership with the Musée national Picasso-Paris. The exhibition ran from 12 October 2021 to 13 February 2022 and won the Historia Prize for Best Historical Exhibition in 2022.

A second version of the exhibition A Foreigner Called Picasso was presented in New York at Gagosian Gallery West 21st Street from 10 November to 22 December 2023.

Following New York, the exhibition traveled to Italy in 2024, beginning with Picasso a Palazzo Te. Poesia e Salvezza, hosted at Palazzo Te in Mantua from 5 September 2024 to 6 January 2025, in collaboration with the Musée National Picasso-Paris and the artist’s family.

From 20 September 2024 to 2 February 2025, Picasso lo straniero opened at Palazzo Reale in Milan, promoted by the City of Milan and produced with Marsilio Arte in collaboration with the Musée National Picasso–Paris, the Palais de la Porte Dorée with the Musée National de l’Histoire de l’Immigration, and the Collection Musée Magnelli Musée de la céramique in Vallauris.

The last edition of the exhibition, after the acclaimed shows in Mantua and Milan, ran from 27 February to 29 June 2025, at Palazzo Cipolla in Rome. Picasso lo straniero was organized by Fondazione Roma with Marsilio Arte, in collaboration with the Musée national Picasso-Paris (MNPP), its principal lender, as well as the Palais de la Porte Dorée with the Musée national de l’histoire de l’immigration, Museu Picasso Barcelona, Musée Picasso Antibes, Musée Magnelli – Musée de la céramique in Vallauris, and important historical private European collections.

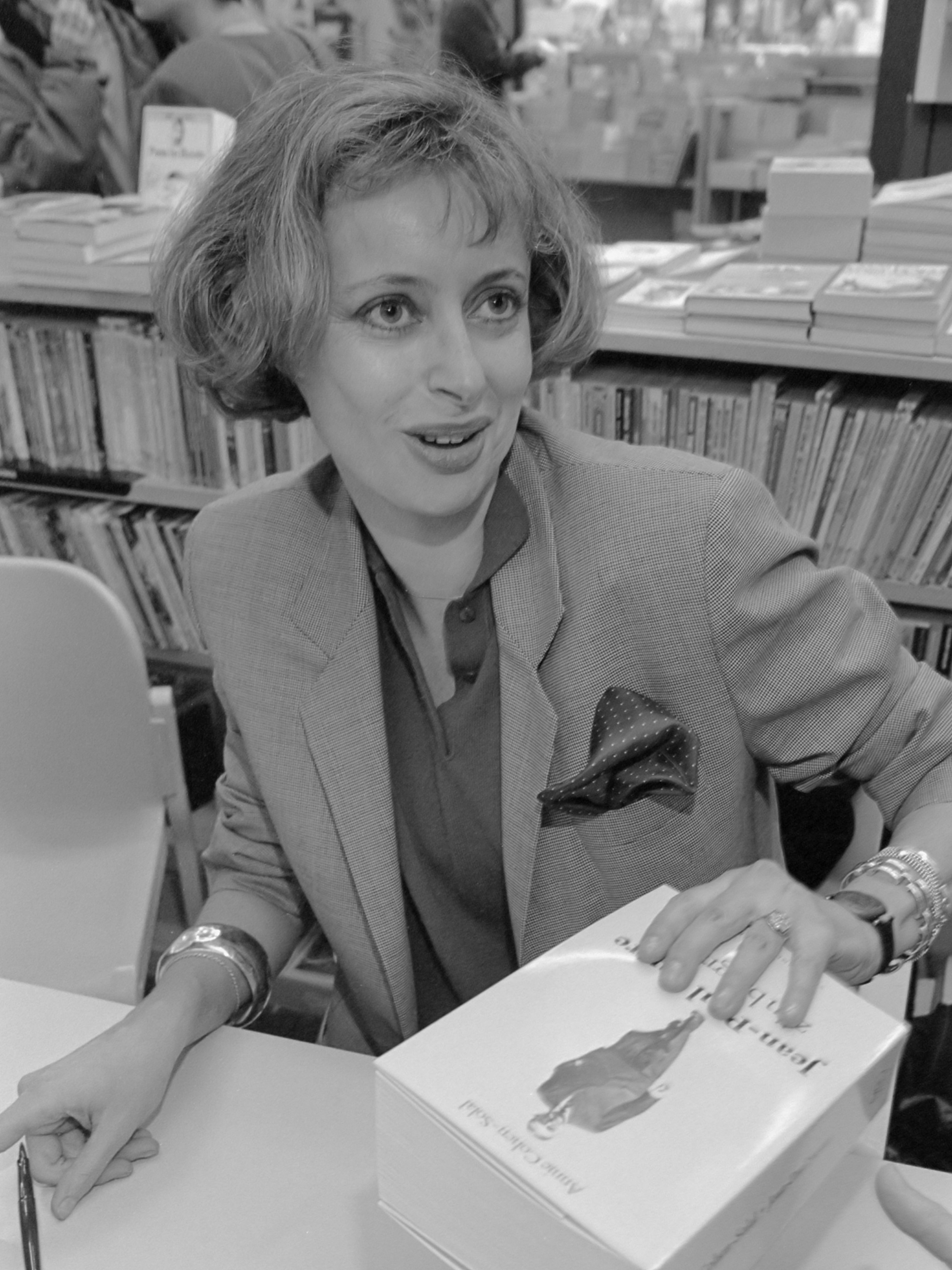
Cohen-Solal in 1988

== Bibliography ==
=== Books ===
- Un étranger nommé Picasso, Paris, Gallimard, coll. Folio, 2021. Translated into English, Spanish, Polish, Italian and Chinese. Awarded Prix Femina essai 2021.
- Revisiting the Rothko Chapel, Paris, Brepols Publishers, 2020.
- Mark Rothko: Toward the Light in the Chapel, New Haven, Yale University Press, 2015. (Jewish Lives series). Translated into French, Spanish, Dutch, Korean and Latvian.
- Une Renaissance sartrienne, Paris, Gallimard, 2013. Translated into Spanish.
- Leo Castelli et les siens, Paris, Gallimard, 2009. Translated into English, Italian, Dutch, Spanish, Turkish, and Chinese. Awarded Prix Artcurial 2010.
- Sartre, un penseur pour le XXIe siècle, Paris, Gallimard, 2005. (Coll. « Découvertes Gallimard / Littératures », no. 468).
- Jean-Paul Sartre, Paris, PUF, 2005. (Coll. "Que sais-je ?", no. 3732). Translated into Japanese, Turkish, Arabic, Spanish, and Portuguese.
- «Un jour, ils auront des peintres». L'avènement des peintres américains (Paris 1867 - New York 1948), Paris, Gallimard, 2000. Translated into English, Italian and Dutch. Awarded Prix Bernier de l'Académie des beaux-arts 2000.
- Sartre 1905–1980, Paris, Gallimard, 1985. (Coll. "Folio-Essais"). Translated into Portuguese, Italian, English, Japanese, Swedish, Dutch, German, Spanish, Danish, Hebrew, Hungarian and Croatian.

=== Catalogs and essays ===
- Picasso lo straniero, exhibition catalog, Marsilio Arte, 2025.
- Picasso lo straniero exhibition catalog, Marsilio Arte, 2024.
- Picasso, l’étranger, exhibition catalog, Fayard, 2021.
- Istanbul/Montparnasse, Les Peintres Turcs de l’École de Paris, Author Clotilde Scordia, Preface by Annie Cohen-Solal, Declinaison, 2021.
- France-Amérique. Un échange de bons procédés, Flammarion / France Culture, Collection Essais/Documents, 2018.
- Calder, Forgeron de géantes libellules, Paris, Gallimard et Musée Soulages, 2017.
- La valeur de l'art contemporain, Paris, PUF, 2016. With Cristelle Teroni; coll. "La vie des idées".
- « In Quest of The Mastaba », in Christo et Jeanne-Claude: Barils/Barrels, Fondation Maeght, 2016.
- The Broad Collection, Prestel, 2015.
- Calder/Prouvé, New York, Gagosian Gallery, 2014. Translated into French and Italian.
- Magiciens de la terre: retour sur une exposition légendaire (with Jean-Hubert Martin), Paris, Éditions du centre Pompidou, Éditions Xavier Barral, 2014, 400 p.
- New York Mid-Century (with Paul Goldberger and Robert Gottlieb), New York, Thames & Hudson, 2014, 399 p. Translated into French and German.
- Artistes et déracinement : le cas de Mark Rothko in Migrations, réfugiés, exil, Éditions Odile Jacob, Collection Travaux du Collège de France, 2012.
- The multiples territories of Cy Twombly, in Cy Twombly. Works from The Sonnabend Collection, Eykyn Maclean, Edited by Kristy Bryce, 2012.
- Alexander Calder – Les Années Parisiennes, 1926-1933, Éditions du Centre Georges Pompidou, 2009. Translated into English.
- The Ultimate Challenge for Alfred H. Barr, Jr.: Transforming the Ecology of American Culture, 1924–1943, p. 196-214, in: Abstract Expressionism The International Context, Joan Marter editor, New Brunswick, Rutgers University Press, 2007.
- Existentialism Is a Humanism, p. 3-15, Preface to the English version of Explication de L'Étranger et L'Existentialisme est un humanisme, New Haven, YUP, 2007.
- SARTRE, Gallimard /Bibliothèque nationale de France, 2005.
- Jean-Paul Sartre Iconographie commentée, Paris, Gallimard, 1991, Album "La Pléiade".
- Lettre d'Italie, in Lettres d'Europe, Albin Michel, Paris 1988.
- Paul Nizan, communiste impossible, Paris, Grasset, 1980.

== Other contributions ==
- Séjour d'études « Picasso l'étranger », July 2020, Fondation des Treilles
- Artists in Time of Crisis : On Christo, Sartre, Rothko and Calder, 92Y, June 2020
- Around the Rothko Chapel, an international symposium, Fondation des Treilles, July 2019
- Juifs et Musulmans français dans l'oeil Américain in Libération, 15/02/2016.
- Tracing Rothko's Vision Throughout the World : A Rothko Blog in Libération, 2015
- Revisiting Magicians of the Earth in Collecting Geographies, Stedelijks Museum, Amsterdam, 2014.
- Sartre Reconsidered in Light of the Obama Era, keynote address, 17th Conference of the North American Sartre Society, University of Memphis, Memphis, Tennessee, 21–23 November 2009
- Simone de Beauvoir and 'The Wonders of America': 1947-1951, p. 79-95, in: Simone de Beauvoir. Centennial Conference, volume X, The Florence Gould Lectures at New York University, Center for Civilization and Culture, New York University, New York, Summer 2009
- To Ileana, from Bob : Rauschenberg Drawings from the Sonnabend Collection, Craig F. Starr Gallery, 2009.
- Parisian Metamorphosis in Four Acts, p. 220-225, in : Alexander Calder, the Paris Years 1926-1933, catalogue d'exposition, Whitney Museum of American Art et Centre Pompidou, Paris, 2008
- Sartre at His Centennial: Errant Master or Moral Compass?, p. 223-230, in: Theory and Society, Kluwer, Boston, 2007
- Sartre and the United States: A Series of Adventures in America, Journal of Romance Studies, Oxford, 2006
- Planting the Seeds of Modernism in the United States,, p. 173-185, in: Partisan Review, vol. LXVIII, n° 2, William Phillips, éditeur, Boston, Boston University, Spring 2002.
- An Affair to Remember, New York Times, 14 July 2002.
- Claude L. Strauss' in the United States, in: Partisan Review, vol. LXVII, n° 2, William Phillips, éditeur, Boston, Boston University, Spring 2000.
- Between Sartre and Camus, the Algerian War, in: Journal of European Studies, vol. XXVIII, Richard J. Golsan, editor, Bucks, Alpha Academic, 1998.
- Coal Miners and Dinosaurs, p. 125-136, in : Media Studies Journal, special issue: « Global Views on U.S Media », New York, The Freedom Forum Media Studies Center, New York, Columbia University, Fall 1995.
- France and the Fear of the New Germany: A view from France, Partisan Review, October 1995.
- Culture and the French Nation, p. 161-167, in: Culture and Democracy: Social and Ethical Issues in Public Support of the Arts and Humanities, Andrew Buchwalter, editor, Boulder, Colorado, Westview Press, 1992.
- Tracking Down a Willing and Reluctant Hero, p. 86-96, in: L'Esprit Créateur, vol. XXIX, n°4, Susan R. Suleiman, editor, Cambridge, MA, Harvard University Press, 1989.
- The Young Sartre, p. 212-226, in: Partisan Review, vol. 54, n°2, William Phillips, Boston, Boston University, 1987.
- Simone de Beauvoir, Vogue, New York, July 1985.
- Mode galopante d'un produit mixte, p. 133-137, in: Revue des sciences humaines, numéro spécial : « Récits de vie », tome LXII, no 191–192, Lille, Université de Lille III, 1983.
- Un Yéménite dans une poste (with Christian Bachmann), p. 80-97, in : Etudes de Linguistique Appliquée, n°37, André Abbou, rédacteur en chef, Paris, Didier Erudition, janvier-mars 1980.

== Press ==
=== Video and radio ===
- L'Interrogazione del Messaggero, May 2025.
- Entretien d’Issy: Jean-Paul Sartre décrypté par Annie Cohen-Solal, April 2025.
- Interview for Kilimangiaro Rai, November 2024.
- Picasso, lo straniero, a conversation with Luca Beatrice, Circolo dei lettori, October 2024.
- "Picasso Esule", a conversation with Niccolò Ammaniti and Michele Fusilli, Festivaletteratura, September 2024.
- "Sacred Spaces and Post War Arts", Webinair TEFAF, Apollo Magazine, November 2020.
- "Artists in Time of Crisis : Remembering Christo", 92nd Street Y, June 2020.
- Exploring Mark Rothko with Annie Cohen-Solal, in conversation with Peter Selz for Stanford Institute for Creativity and the Arts (SiCa), May 2015.
- Interview on book "Mark Rothko: Toward the Light in the Chapel,", Charlie Rose, May 2015.
- "Leo Castelli: A Global Gallerist Anchored in Renaissance Italy", 25 October 2010.
- "The Life and Influence of Leo Castelli", Interview with Leonard Lopate, August 2010.
- Reading on Leo & His Circle, at Christie's, New York, 2009.
- Annie Cohen-Solal: Jean-Paul Sartre, Cornell University, October 2008).
- Lectures and Interviews for France Culture.
- Interviews with Bernard Pivot for Apostrophes.
- Midday with Dan Rodricks.

=== Press excerpts ===
- With a Big Sale Looming, a New View of Rothko, by William Grimes, Artbeats, 12/03/2015.
- "A Very Wily Believer", by MicThe New York Review of Books, 01/13/2011.
- "A Smooth Operator, at the Vanguard of the Gallery World in the 1960s", by Dwight Garner, The New York Times, 05/18/2010.
- "Leo the Lion, How the Castelli gallery changed the art world", The New Yorker, 06/07/2010.
- "From Trieste to New York. Annie Cohen-Solal's Leo & His Circle", by Alessandro Cassin, Primo Levi Center, 01/26/2010.
- "Leo and His Circle", Christian Science Monitor, 07/02/2010.
- "Leo & His Circle: The Life of Leo Castelli", Society of Contemporary Artists, 06/14/2010.
- "Ten Juicy Tales from the New Leo Castelli Biography",Art Info, 06/04/2010.
- "Leo and his Circle: The Life of Leo Castelli", Miami Art Guide, 06/02/2010.
- "How France lost art to America Writer traces the rise of New York as the world's art capital", Toronto Star, 05/28/2002.
- "Planting the Seeds of Modernism. An Evening with Annie Cohen-Solal", Partisan Review Vol. LXIX, 04/10/2002.
- "Painting American: The Rise Of American Artists, Paris 1867- New York 1948", Pittsburgh Post-Gazette, 01/23/2001.
- "Leo Castelli: This Charming Man", by Leon Neyfakh, New York Observer, 05/04/2010.
- "French Writer Explores Two Cultures Entwined", by Alan Riding, The New York Times, 11/22/2001.
- "Pinceaux d'Amérique : des peintres pour le nouveau monde", by Caroline Bonnefond, Libération, 07/2001.
