= List of storms named Colleen =

The name Colleen has been used to name four tropical cyclones worldwide: three in the Western Pacific Ocean and one in the South Pacific.

In the Western Pacific Ocean:

- Typhoon Colleen (1989) (T8925, 28W)– did not affect any large landmasses.
- Typhoon Colleen (1992) (T9226, 26W, Paring) – made landfall on the Philippines and Vietnam as a tropical storm.
- Tropical Storm Colleen (1995) (T9523, 31W) – not a threat to land, JMA analyzed it as a depression.

In the South Pacific:

- Cyclone Colleen (1969) – lasted from January 28 to February 5.
