= HMS Colleen =

Two ships of the Royal Navy have been named HMS Colleen:

- HMS Hawk was a coastguard gunboat launched in 1869. She was renamed HMS Amelia in 1888, HMS Colleen in 1905, HMS Colleen Old in 1916, HMS Emerald in 1918 and HMS Cuckoo later in 1918 before being sold in 1922.
- HMS Royalist was a Satellite-class corvette launched 1883. She was hulked as a depot ship in 1900, renamed HMS Colleen in 1913 and transferred to the Irish Free State in 1923. She was scrapped in 1950.
