= Coulon (surname) =

Coulon is a surname. Notable people with the surname include:

- Cécile Coulon (born 1990), French novelist and poet
- Eugène Germain Coulon (1808–1891), French-born dance teacher
- George David Coulon (1822–1904), American painter
- Georges Coulon (1838–1912), vice president of the French Council of State
- Jean-François Coulon (1764–1836), French ballet dancer and teacher
- Jean-Michel Coulon (1920–2014), French painter
- Jocelyn Coulon (born 1957), Quebec author, researcher and former federal election candidate
- Johnny Coulon (1889–1973), American boxer
