= Johannes Emde =

German evangelist

Johannes Emde (1774–1859) was a German evangelist who lived in Indonesia. He became one of the founders of the churches in East Java. In Surabaya he was given the nickname of Saint Surabaya.

== Biography ==
Johannes Emde was born in Schmillinghausen, near Arolsen, Germany in 1774 and died in Surabaya in 1859. In Indonesia, Emde lived in Surabaya, earning his living as a watchmaker, and married a Javanese woman from the Solo kraton. He was a Pietist, and was already living in Surabaya when he started preaching in about 1815.

Emde did his missionary work by asking children to spread the Gospel of Mark as translated by Bruchner to literate people at the markets. This gospel was widely discussed because of how different it was from other religious texts available at the time. Emde also taught the people of Surabaya about Christianity and how Christians had to be baptised, which had not been taught by Coenrad Laurens Coolen, a previous missionary. Among those taught by Emde was a kyai from Madura named Midah, who was eventually baptised along with his followers by A. W. Meijer.

Although he respected the Javanese, he tried to keep his converts away from Javanese culture and Islam - for instance, he strictly forbade circumcision. Because Emde's converts practiced Dutch culture, they were called Kristen Landa (Dutch Christians).
