= Hans Georg Emde =

German politician

Member of the Bundestag
- In office 17 October 1961 – 19 October 1969

Personal details
- Born: 28 July 1919 Wuppertal-Elberfeld
- Died: 15 February 2013 (aged 93)
- Party: FDP

Hans Georg Emde (28 July 1919 – 15 February 2013) was a German politician of the Free Democratic Party (FDP) and former member of the German Bundestag.

== Life ==
Emde was a member of the German Bundestag from 1961 to 1969. From 19 February 1963 to 1965 he was a member of the executive committee of the FDP parliamentary group as Parliamentary Managing Director. From 1969 to 1972, Emde was a civil servant state secretary at the Federal Ministry of Finance and the Federal Ministry of Economics and Finance.

== Literature ==
Herbst, Ludolf; Jahn, Bruno (2002). Vierhaus, Rudolf (ed.). Biographisches Handbuch der Mitglieder des Deutschen Bundestages. 1949–2002 [Biographical Handbook of the Members of the German Bundestag. 1949–2002] (in German). München: De Gruyter - De Gruyter Saur. p. 1715. ISBN 978-3-11-184511-1.
