= Coenraad Laurens Coolen =

Indonesian evangelist

- Born: 1775; Ungaran, Java
- Died: July 2, 1873; Mojokerto, East Java
- Occupation: Lay evangelists
- Known for: Early evangelical work in East Java

Coenraad Laurens Coolen (1775 in Ungaran – 2 July 1873, in Mojokerto) is one of the lay evangelists who did some of the first evangelical work in East Java.

== Biography ==
Coolen was born in Ungaran in 1775. Despite his Dutch surname and given names, his father supposedly was from Russia and his mother was a daughter of Prince Kojaran of the noble family of Mataram. Coolen was educated in ELS and then went into military service. While there, he came into contact with a group of pious commoners named "the Surabaya Saints" led by the German watchmaker Johannes Emde. In Surabaya Coolen married an English woman and had five children. Possibly after her death, he remarried Sadiyah and had three children with her. After some years working for the military and the forestry service, Coolen obtained permission to clear forest in the Ngoro region near Mojoagung, Jombang). He founded a village, which had around 1000 Javanese inhabitants in the 1840s. Unlike Emde in Surabaya, he did not baptize his people until 1854 and never had them change their names or cut their hair. His assistants Paul Tosari and Abisai Ditatruna founded a new village Mojowarno, which for the next century would become the center of Christianity in East Java.
